= Graham (given name) =

- Pronunciation: /ˈɡreɪ.əm/ or /ˈɡræm/
- Gender: Unisex (primarily masculine)
- Language: English

Origin
- Meaning: "gravelly homestead"
- Region of origin: Scotland

Other names
- Variant forms: Graeme, Grantham, Grahame
- See also: Graham (surname)

Graham is a masculine (and, to a lesser extent, feminine) given name in the English language. It is derived from the surname. The variant form Graeme can also be pronounced /ˈɡreɪm/.

== Origins ==
The surname Graham is an Anglo-French form of the name of the town of Grantham, in Lincolnshire, England. The settlement is recorded in the 11th century Domesday Book variously as Grantham, Grandham, Granham and Graham. This place name is thought to be derived from the Old English elements grand, possibly meaning "gravel", and ham, meaning "hamlet" the English word given to small settlements of smaller size than villages.

== Variants and use ==
In the 12th century the surname was taken from England to Scotland by Sir William de Graham, who founded Clan Graham. Variant spellings of the forename are Grahame and Graeme. The forename Graham is considered to be an English and Scottish given name. Its origin as a surname has led to its occasional use as a female given name, as for example in the case of Graham Cockburn, a daughter of Henry Cockburn, Lord Cockburn.

== Notable people ==
=== A ===
- Graham Abbey (born 1971), Canadian actor
- Graham Abel (born 1960), English footballer
- Graham Ackerman (born 1983), American gymnast
- Graham Adams (1933–2020), English football player and coach
- Graham Addley (born 1963), Canadian politician
- Graham Agassiz (born 1990), Canadian mountain biker
- Graham Alexander (born 1971), English football manager and player
- Graham Alexander (born 1989), American singer-songwriter, entertainer and entrepreneur
- Graham Allan (1936–2007), English mathematician
- Graham Allen (disambiguation), multiple people
- Graham Allison (born 1940), American political scientist
- Graham Allner (born 1949), English football player and manager
- Graham Anderson (1929–2012), British-born Canadian heraldic scholar and officer of arms
- Graham Annable (born 1970), Canadian cartoonist and animator
- Graham Annesley (born 1957), Australian politician
- Graham Anthony (born 1975), English footballer
- Graham Anthony Devine (born 1971), English classical guitarist
- Graham Appo (born 1974), Indigenous Australian rugby league footballer
- Graham Arader, American art dealer
- Graham Archell (born 1950), English footballer
- Graham Armitage (1936–1999), English actor
- Graham Armstrong (1918–1960), American football player
- Graham Arnold (born 1963), Australian soccer manager
- Graham Arnold (artist) (1932–2019), English artist
- Graham Arthur (1936–2021), Australian rules footballer
- Graham Arthur Barden (1896–1967), American politician
- Graham Ashcraft (born 1998), American baseball player
- Graham Ashton (born 1962), Australian police officer
- Graham Ashton (trumpeter), British-born naturalized American trumpeter and composer
- Graham Astley (born 1957), Australian cricketer
- Graham Atkinson (1943–2017), English footballer
- Graham Atkinson (cricketer) (1938–2015), English cricketer
- Graham Avery (1929–2015), New Zealand racing cyclist
- Graham Ayliffe (1926–2017), British medical microbiologist

=== B ===
- Graham Badari (born 1963), Aboriginal Australian artist
- Graham Bagnall (1912–1986), New Zealand librarian, bibliographer and historian
- Graham Bailey (disambiguation), multiple people
- Graham Baker (disambiguation), multiple people
- Graham Balcombe (1907–2000), English cave diver
- Graham Baldwin (born c. 1954), British anti-cult activist
- Graham Balfour (1858–1929), English educationalist and author
- Graham Ball (disambiguation), multiple people
- Graham Bamford (born 1944), Australian rules footballer
- Graham Basanti (born 1950), Indian priest
- Graham Bassett (born 1964), English footballer
- Graham Barber (born 1958), English football referee
- Graham Barham (born 1998), American country singer-songwriter
- Graham Barlow (born 1950), English cricketer
- Graham Barnett (disambiguation), multiple people
- Graham Barnfield (born 1969), British academic and pundit
- Graham Barrett (born 1981), Irish footballer
- Graham Barrow (born 1954), English footballer
- Graham Barton (born 2002), American football player
- Graham Bayne (born 1979), Scottish footballer
- Graham Beale (born 1958), British businessman
- Graham Bean (born 1961), English police officer
- Graham Beck (1929–2010), South African business magnate, winemaker, stud farmer and philanthropist
- Graham Beckel (born 1949), American character actor
- Graham Beech (1924–1993), English rower
- Graham Beighton (born 1939), English footballer
- Graham Bell (disambiguation), multiple people
- Graham Bencini (born 1976), Maltese footballer
- Graham Bendel, British writer and filmmaker
- Graham Bennett (disambiguation), multiple people
- Graham Bensinger (born 1986), American journalist and entrepreneur
- Graham Benstead (born 1963), English footballer
- Graham Bent (1945–2002), Welsh footballer
- Graham Benton, British indoor rower
- Graham Beresford Parkinson (1896–1979), New Zealand soldier
- Graham Berry (1822–1904), Australian politician
- Graham Betchart (born 1978), American mental skills coach
- Graham Bickley (born 1958), English actor and singer
- Graham Bidstrup (born 1950), Australian musician, songwriter, music producer and talent manager
- Graham Biehl (born 1986), American sailor
- Graham Billing (1936–2001), New Zealand novelist, journalist and poet
- Graham Binns, British Army officer
- Graham Bird (1930–2021), British philosopher
- Graham Birkett (born 1954), Scottish rugby union player
- Graham Birks (born 1942), English footballer
- Graham Bizzell (1941–2014), Australian cricketer
- Graham Bladon (1899–1967), British air officer
- Graham Black (1924–2007), Australian cricketer
- Graham Blackall, American blogger
- Graham Blakeway, British rugby league footballer
- Graham Blanks, (born 2002), American long-distance runner
- Graham Bleathman (born 1959), British artist
- Graham Blyth (born 1948), English audio engineer
- Graham Boal (1943–2022), British judge and author
- Graham Boase (born 1941), Australian triple jumper
- Graham Boettcher (born 1973), American art curator
- Graham Bond (disambiguation), multiple people
- Graham Bonnet (born 1947), English rock singer
- Graham Bonney (born 1943), British singer-songwriter
- Graham Booth (1940–2011), British politician
- Graham Borrack (born 1937), Australian rules footballer
- Graham Botting (1915–2007), New Zealand cricket and hockey player
- Graham Bowman (born 1993), Scottish footballer
- Graham Boyce (born 1945), British diplomat
- Graham Boynton, British journalist, consultant, travel writer and editor
- Graham Bradley, horse racer
- Graham Brady (born 1967), British politician
- Graham Branch (born 1972), English footballer
- Graham Brandt (1947–2011), Australian rules footballer
- Graham Bray (born 1953), English rugby league footballer
- Graham Brazier (1952–2015), New Zealand musician and songwriter
- Graham Bressington (born 1966), English footballer
- Graham Briggs (born 1983), British road racing cyclist
- Graham Bright (born 1942), British politician and businessman
- Graham Brightwell, British mathematician
- Graham Broad (born 1957), English drummer
- Graham Broadbent, British film and television producer
- Graham Brody (born 1993), Gaelic footballer
- Graham Brookhouse (born 1962), British modern pentathlete
- Graham Brown (disambiguation), multiple people
- Graham Bruce (born 1952), Canadian politician
- Graham Buckley (born 1963), Scottish footballer
- Graham Budd (born 1968), British paleontologist
- Graham Budgett (born 1954), British-American conceptual artist
- Graham Buist (born 1936), New Zealand cricketer
- Graham Bunyard (1939–2018), South African cricketer
- Graham Burgess (born 1968), English chess player, trainer and writer
- Graham Burgess (cricketer) (born 1943), English cricketer
- Graham Burgin (born 1948), Australian rules footballer
- Graham Burke (born 1993), Irish footballer
- Graham Burkett (1936–2014), Australian politician
- Graham Burnett (born 1965), New Zealand cricketer
- Graham Burns (born 1966), British canoeist
- Graham Butcher (born 1981), English cricketer
- Graham Bux (born 1957), Australian rules footballer

=== C ===
- Graham Cairns (born 1971), British author and academic
- Graham Cairns-Smith (1931–2016), organic chemist and molecular biologist
- Graham Callanan (born 1982), Irish hurler
- Graham Calder (born c. 1981), Scottish rugby union player
- Graham Calder Mullen (born 1940), American judge
- Graham Calverley (born 1943), Australian rules footballer
- Graham Campbell (disambiguation), multiple people
- Graham Candy (born 1991), New Zealand singer-songwriter
- Graham Cantwell (born 1974), Irish film and television director
- Graham Canty (born 1980), Irish Gaelic footballer
- Graham Capill (born 1959), New Zealand Christian leader, politician and convicted rapist
- Graham Carey (born 1989), Irish footballer
- Graham Carr (born 1944), English football player, manager and scout
- Graham Caulfield (born 1943), English footballer
- Graham Cawthorne (born 1958), English footballer
- Graham Chadwick (1923–2007), British missionary
- Graham Chadwick (footballer) (born 1942), English footballer
- Graham H. Chapin (1799–1843), American lawyer and politician
- Graham Chapman (1941–1989), British actor, comedian and writer
- Graham Charles Wood (1934–2016), English corrosion scientist
- Graham Charlesworth (born 1965), English cricketer
- Graham Chidgey (born 1937), English cricketer
- Graham Chipchase (born 1963), British businessman
- Graham Chittenden, Canadian standup comedian and television writer
- Graham Clark (disambiguation), multiple people
- Graham Clive Watts (born 1956), British executive and fencer
- Graham Cluley (born 1969), British security blogger and author
- Graham Coaker (1932–1971), British engineer and businessman
- Graham Colclough (1883–1954), Australian rules footballer
- Graham Colditz (born 1954), Australian chronic disease epidemiologist
- Graham Coldrick (1945–2022), Welsh footballer
- Graham Cole (born 1952), English actor
- Graham Collier (1937–2011), English jazz bassist, bandleader and composer
- Graham Collier (footballer) (born 1951), English footballer
- Graham Collingridge (born 1955), British neuroscientist
- Graham Colton (born 1981), American singer-songwriter
- Graham Condon (1949–2007), New Zealand disabled athlete
- Graham Connah (1934–2023), British-born archaeologist
- Graham Connell (born 1974), Scottish footballer
- Graham Cook (1893–1916), New Zealand soldier and rugby league footballer
- Graham Cooke, British clinical scientist
- Graham Coop (born 1979), British-American population geneticist
- Graham Cooper (disambiguation), multiple people
- Graham Cormack, Scottish curler
- Graham Cornes (born 1948), Australian rules footballer
- Graham Cottrell (born 1945), English cricketer
- Graham Coughlan (born 1974), Irish football manager
- Graham Coughtry (1931–1999), Canadian painter
- Graham Cowan (1940–2011), New Zealand cricketer
- Graham Cowdrey (1964–2020), English cricketer
- Graham Cox (disambiguation), multiple people
- Graham Coxon (born 1969), English musician
- Graham Cumming (born 1941), Rhodesian field hockey player
- Graham Cummins (born 1987), Irish footballer
- Graham Cutts (1884–1958), British film director

=== D ===
- Graham Dadds (1911–1980), British field hockey player
- Graham Dale (born 1978), Irish-American marine, network engineer and writer
- Graham Daniels (born 1962), English footballer
- Graham Davidge, Australian musician
- Graham Davies (1921–2003), Welsh footballer
- Graham Davis (born 1953), Fijian-born Australian journalist
- Graham Davis (racing driver), British auto racing driver
- Graham Davy (1936–2018), New Zealand athlete and sports administrator
- Graham Dawbarn (1893–1976), British architect
- Graham Dawe (born 1959), English rugby union footballer and coach
- Graham Day (born 1933), British-Canadian business executive, lawyer and corporate director
- Graham Day (1953–2021), English footballer
- Graham Deakin (born c. 1950), English rock drummer
- Graham Deakin (footballer) (born 1987), English footballer
- Graham Dee (born 1943), English musician
- Graham DeLaet (born 1982), Canadian golfer
- Graham Delbridge (1917–1980), Australian bishop
- Graham Dempster (born 1955), Australian rules footballer
- Graham Dene (born 1949), British radio personality
- Graham Deuble (born 1943), Australian diver
- Graham Dewes (born 1982), Fijian rugby union player
- Graham Diamond (born 1949), English author
- Graham Diggle (1889–1971), Australian rules footballer
- Graham Dilley (1959–2011), English cricketer
- Graham Diprose, British photographer and author
- Graham Dixon-Lewis (1922–2010), British combustion engineer
- Graham Dockray (born 1946), British physiologist
- Graham Dodsworth (born 1956), Australian folklorist
- Graham Doggart (1897–1963), English administrator, cricketer, footballer and magistrate
- Graham Donaldson (1935–2001), Australian rules footballer
- Graham Dorey (1932–2015), Bailiff of Guernsey
- Graham Dorrans (born 1987), Scottish footballer
- Graham Dorrington, English aeronautical engineer
- Graham Douglas (disambiguation), multiple people
- Graham Dow (born 1942), British Anglican bishop
- Graham Dowd (born 1963), New Zealand rugby union player
- Graham Dowling (born 1937), New Zealand cricketer
- Graham Doyle (born 1974), Irish public servant and soccer player
- Graham Drane (1916–1996), Australian sailor
- Graham Drinkwater (1875–1946), Canadian ice hockey player, businessman and philanthropist
- Graham Dudman (born 1963), newspaper editor
- Graham Duff (born 1964), English writer, actor and producer
- Graham Dugoni (born 1986), American entrepreneur and soccer player
- Graham Duncan (disambiguation), multiple people
- Graham Dunlop (born 1976), Scottish field hockey player
- Graham Dunn (born 1950), Australian swimmer
- Graham Dunscombe (1924–2020), Australian rules footballer
- Graham Dunstan Martin (1932–2021), British author, translator and philologist
- Graham Dury (born 1962), British cartoonist
- Graham Duxbury (born 1955), South African racing driver, businessman and motorsport commentator

=== E ===
- Graham Eadie (born 1953), Australian rugby league footballer
- Graham Earl (born 1978), British boxer
- Graham Easter (born 1969), English footballer
- Graham Eatough (born 1971), English theatre director and playwright
- Graham Eccles (born 1949), English rugby league footballer
- Graham Edwards (disambiguation), multiple people
- Graham Edmunds (born 1974), British swimmer
- Graham Egerton Bowman-Manifold (1871–1940), British Army officer
- Graham Eggleton, Scottish athlete
- Graham Elliot (born 1977), American chef, restaurateur and reality television personality
- Graham Ellis (born 1965), Scottish physical education teacher and rugby union player
- Graham Ernst (born 1940), Australian trade unionist and politician
- Graham Evans (disambiguation), multiple people
- Graham Everest (1957–2010), British mathematician
- Graham Everett (born 1947), American poet, professor, publisher, musician and artist
- Graham Eyres-Monsell, 2nd Viscount Monsell (1905–1993), British lieutenant colonel

=== F ===
- Graham Fagen (born 1966), Scottish artist
- Graham Fairchild (1906–1994), American entomologist
- Graham Farmelo (born 1953), biographer and science writer
- Polly Farmer (real name Graham Farmer; 1935–2019), Australian rules footballer
- Graham Farquhar (born 1947), Australian biophysicist
- Graham Farquharson (1940–2022), Canadian mining engineer and executive
- Graham Farrell (born 1967), British criminologist
- Graham Farrow, English playwright and screenwriter
- Graham Faulkner (born 1947), British actor
- Graham Faultless, English rower
- Graham Faux, Australian rugby league footballer
- Graham Feakes (1930–1994), Australian public servant and diplomat
- Graham Fellows (born 1959), English actor and musician
- Graham Fenton (born 1974), English football manager and player
- Graham Fleming (born 1949), English chemistry professor
- Graham Fletcher (disambiguation), multiple people
- Graham Fleury (born 1959), New Zealand sailor
- Graham Flight (born 1936), Canadian politician
- Graham Filler (born c. 1983), American politician
- Graham Findlay (1864–1924), Scottish rugby union player
- Graham Fink, multimedia artist
- Graham Finlay (1936–2018), New Zealand boxer
- Graham Finlayson (1932–1999), English photojournalist
- Graham Finn, Irish musician and producer
- Graham Fisk (1928–2008), British rower
- Graham Fitch, English pianist and piano teacher
- Graham N. Fitch (1809–1892), American politician and brigade commander
- Graham Fitkin (born 1963), British composer, pianist and conductor
- Smacka Fitzgibbon (real name Graham Fitzgibbon; 1930–1979), Australian banjoist and vocalist
- Graham Fitzpatrick, Scottish film director and screenwriter
- Graham Foley (1923–2017), English Anglican clergyman
- Graham Forbes (born 1951), Scottish priest
- Graham Ford (born 1960), South African cricket coach and player
- Graham Forsythe (1952–2012), Canadian artist
- Graham Fortune (1941–2016), New Zealand diplomat and public servant
- Graham Foster (disambiguation), multiple people
- Graham Foust (born 1970), American poet and professor
- Graham Fox (born 1957), Australian rules footballer
- Graham Foy (born 1987), Canadian filmmaker
- Graham Fransella (born 1950), Australian painter
- Graham Fraser (disambiguation), multiple people
- Graham French (born 1945), English footballer
- Graham Freudenberg (1934–2019), Australian author and political speechwriter
- Graham Frost (born 1947), English cricketer
- Graham Fry (born 1949), British diplomat
- Graham E. Fuller (born 1937), American author and political analyst
- Graham Fuller (cricketer) (born 1931), South African cricketer
- Graham Futcher (born 1953), English footballer
- Graham Fyfe (disambiguation), multiple people

=== G ===
- Graham Galbraith (born 1960), British academic and administrator
- Graham Gano (born 1987), American football player
- Graham Gardiner, Australian lightweight rower
- Graham Gardner, English librarian
- Graham Gardner (cricketer) (born 1966), English-born Scottish cricketer
- Graham Gartland (born 1983), Irish football coach and player
- Graham Gaunt (born 1953), Australian rules footballer
- Graham Gedye (1929–2014), New Zealand cricketer
- Graham Geldenhuys (born 1959), South African cricketer
- Graham George (1912–1993), Canadian composer, music theorist, organist, choir conductor and music educator
- Graham George Able (born 1947), English educationalist
- Graham Geraghty (born 1973), Gaelic footballer
- Graham Gibbons (1920–2016), Bermudian businessman and politician
- Graham Gibson (born 1980), Scottish footballer
- Graham Giffard (born 1959), Australian politician
- Graham Gilchrist (1932–2015), Australian rules footballer
- Graham Gilles (born 1946), Australian sprint canoer
- Graham Gilmour (1885–1912), British pioneer aviator
- Graham Gipson (1932–2023), Australian athlete
- Graham Girvan (born 1990), Scottish footballer
- Graham Glasgow (born 1992), American football player
- Graham Glenn (born 1933), Australian public servant
- Graham Glover, professor
- Graham Goddard (born 1982), Trinidadian-American conceptual artist
- Graham Godfrey (born 1984), American baseball player
- Graham Gold (born 1954), British DJ
- Graham Goninon (born 1945), Australian rules footballer
- Graham Gooch (born 1953), English cricketer
- Graham Gooday (1942–2001), British molecular biologist
- Graham Goode (born 1949), British racing car driver and car tuning specialist
- Graham Goodkind (born 1966), English businessman
- Graham Goodwin (born 1945), Australian professor and electrical engineer
- Graham Gordon (1927–2004), New Zealand general practitioner and surgeon
- Graham Gore (c. 1809–1847/48), English Navy officer and polar explorer
- Graham Gotch (1936–2011), Australian rules footballer
- Graham Gouldman (born 1946), English singer, musician and songwriter
- Graham Gower (1947–2017), English athlete
- Graham Grace (born 1975), South African cricketer
- Graham Graham-Montgomery (1823–1901), Scottish baronet
- Graham Greene (disambiguation), multiple people
- Graham Griffiths (born 1944), New Zealand footballer
- Graham Gristwood (born 1984), British orienteer
- Graham Guit (born 1968), French director and screenwriter
- Graham Gund (born 1940), American architect
- Graham Gunn (born 1942), Australian politician
- Graham Guy (born 1983), Scottish footballer

=== H ===
- Graham Hair (born 1943), Australian composer, music scholar and academic
- Graham Haley, African-born Canadian author and television host
- Graham Hamer (born 1936), New Zealand rugby union coach
- Graham Hamilton (born 1944), British actor
- Graham Hamilton (swimmer) (1939–1989), Australian swimmer
- Sir Graham Hamond, 2nd Baronet (1779–1862), British Royal Navy officer
- Graham Hancock (born 1950), British writer
- Graham Harbey (born 1964), English footballer
- Graham Harcourt (1934–2015), British gymnast
- Graham Harding (1937–2018), British professor
- Graham Harding (cricketer) (born 1966), English cricketer
- Graham Harle (1931–2022), British-born Canadian politician
- Graham Harman (born 1968), American philosopher
- Graham Harrell (born 1985), American football player and coach
- Graham Harris (born 1937), Australian politician
- Graham Harris (rugby league) (1946–?), English rugby league footballer
- Graham Hart (1906–1974), Australian politician and judge
- Graham Hart (civil servant) (born 1940), British civil servant
- Graham V. Hartstone (born 1944), British sound engineer
- Graham Harvey (disambiguation), multiple people
- Graham Haskell (born 1948), Australian athlete
- Graham Hatfull (born 1957), English professor and biotechnologist
- Graham Hathaway (born 1951), British auto racing driver
- Graham Hatley (born 1960), Scottish-born Canadian soccer player
- Graham Hawkes (born 1947), English marine engineer and submarine designer
- Graham Hawkins (1946–2016), English football player and manager
- Graham Hay (born 1965), Scottish footballer
- Graham Hayes (1914–1943), British commando
- Graham Haynes (born 1960), American cornetist, trumpeter and composer
- Graham Heal (1945–2018), Australian rules footballer
- Graham Healy (born 1956), Australian politician
- Graham Hearne (born 1937), British businessman
- Graham Hedman (born 1979), British sprinter
- Graham Henderson (disambiguation), multiple people
- Graham Henning, South African golfer
- Graham Henry (born 1946), New Zealand rugby union coach
- Graham Hicks (born 1985), English strongman and powerlifter
- Graham Hilford Pollard, Australian mathematician, professor, statistician, author and lecturer
- Graham Hill (disambiguation), multiple people
- Graham Hitch, British professor and psychologist
- Graham Hobbins (born 1946), English cricketer
- Graham Hobson, American football coach
- Graham Hocking (born 1952), Australian rules footballer
- Graham Hockless (born 1982), English football coach and player
- Graham Hogg (disambiguation), multiple people
- Graham Holderness, British writer and critic
- Graham Holland (born 1961), English and Irish greyhound trainer
- Graham Holroyd (born 1975), English rugby league and rugby union footballer
- Graham Hood (born 1972), Canadian track and field athlete
- Graham Hopkins (born 1975), Irish drummer
- Graham Horn (1954–2012), English footballer
- Graham Horne (born 1971), Scottish snooker player
- Graham Horrex (born 1932), English cricketer
- Graham Hough (1908–1990), English literary critic, poet and professor
- Graham Houghton (1937–2022), New Zealand historian and educator
- Graham House (cricketer) (born 1950), Australian cricketer
- Graham Houston (born 1960), British footballer
- Graham Howarth (1916–2015), English entomologist
- Graham Howe (born 1950), Australian curator, writer, photo-historian and artist
- Graham Howe (businessman) (born 1961), British entrepreneur and businessman
- Graham Howell (born 1951), English footballer
- Graham Howells, Welsh illustrator
- Graham Huggins (1921–2000), Australian football administrator
- Graham Hughes (disambiguation), multiple people
- Graham Hume (born 1990), South African-born cricketer
- Graham Humphreys, British illustrator and visual artist
- Graham Hunnibell (born 1955), Australian rules footballer
- Graham Hunt (disambiguation), multiple people
- Graham Hunter (born 1982), Scottish basketball player
- Graham Hunter (footballer) (1945–2009), Australian rules footballer
- Graham Hurley (born 1946), English crime fiction writer
- Graham Hurrell (born 1975), English badminton player
- Graham Hurst (disambiguation), multiple people
- Graham Hutchings, British chemist and professor
- Graham Hutton (1904–1988), British economist, writer and politician
- Graham Hyde (born 1970), English football manager and player

=== I ===
- Graham Ibbeson (born 1951), British artist and sculptor
- Graham Idle (born 1950), English rugby league footballer
- Graham Ihlein (born 1951), Australian politician
- Graham Ike (born 2002), American basketball player
- Graham Ingels (1915–1991), American comic book and magazine illustrator
- Graham Ingerson (born 1941), Australian politician
- Graham Ingham (1851–1926), British Anglican bishop
- Graham Ion (born 1940), Australian rules footballer
- Graham Ivan Clark (born 2003), American computer hacker, cybercriminal and convicted felon

=== J ===
- Graham Jackson (disambiguation), multiple people
- Graham Jacobs (born 1949), Australian politician
- Graham Jacobs (footballer) (born 1940), Australian rules footballer
- Graham James (disambiguation), multiple people
- Graham James Davies (1935–2023), Welsh archdeacon
- Graham Jarrett (1937–2004), English cricketer
- Graham Jarvis (disambiguation), multiple people
- Graham Jenkin (born 1938), Australian poet, historian, composer and educator
- Graham Jennings (born 1960), Australian association footballer
- Graham Jessop (1957–2012), British commercial diver and marine archaeologist
- Graham John Bower (1848–1933), Irish colonial official
- Graham Johncock (born 1982), Australian rules footballer
- Graham John Hills (1926–2014), English physical chemist, principal and governor
- Graham Johnson (disambiguation), multiple people
- Graham Johnston (swimmer) (1930–2019), South African swimmer
- Graham Jones (disambiguation), multiple people
- Graham Joyce (1954–2014), British writer
- Graham Jukes, British practitioner of environmental health and senior executive

=== K ===
- Graham Kavanagh (born 1973), Irish football manager and player
- Graham Kay, Canadian stand-up comedian
- Graham Kelly (disambiguation), multiple people
- Graham Kennedy (disambiguation), multiple people
- Graham Kendall (born 1961), British professor and computer scientist
- Graham Kendrick (born 1950), English Christian singer, songwriter and worship leader
- Graham Kernwein (1904–1983), American football player
- Graham Kerr (born 1934), English cooking personality
- Graham Kerr (footballer) (born 1934), Australian rules footballer
- Graham Kerr (rugby union) (1872–1913), Scottish rugby union player
- Graham Kersey (1971–1997), English cricketer
- Graham Kibble-White, British writer
- Graham Kierath (born 1950), Australian politician
- Graham Killeen (born 1980), American filmmaker
- Graham Killoughery (born 1984), Irish footballer
- Graham King, English film producer
- Graham Kings (born 1953), English bishop, theologian and poet
- Graham Kingston (born 1950), Welsh cricketer
- Graham Kinniburgh (1942–2003), Australian organized crime figure
- Graham Kirkham, Baron Kirkham (born 1944), English businessman
- Graham Kitchener (born 1989), English rugby union player
- Graham Kolbeins (born 1987), Canadian filmmaker, writer and fashion designer
- Graham Koonce (born 1975), American baseball player
- Graham Kribs (born 1971), American theoretical particle physicist

=== L ===
- Graham Laidler (1908–1940), British cartoonist
- Graham Lake (cricketer) (1935–2023), English cricketer
- Graham Lancashire (born 1970), English footballer
- Graham Latimer (1926–2016), New Zealand Māori leader
- Graham Law, English rugby league footballer
- Graham Lawrence, New Zealand rower
- Graham Laws (born 1961), English association football referee
- Graham Lay (1960–2016), British military antique expert
- Graham Layton (1917–1999), British Pakistani Army officer, businessman and philanthropist
- Graham Lea (1934–2013), Canadian broadcaster, politician and corporate leader
- Graham Lear (born 1949), English-born Canadian rock drummer
- Graham Lee (disambiguation), multiple people
- Graham Lees, publisher and editor-in-chief
- Graham Leggat (1934–2015), Scottish footballer
- Graham Leggett (1921–2013), British Air Force squadron leader
- Graham Leigh (born 1975), American football player
- Graham Leishman (born 1968), English footballer
- Graham Leonard (1921–2010), English Roman Catholic priest
- Graham Letto, Canadian politician
- Graham Levy (born 1938), Australian cricketer
- Graham Lewis (born 1953), English musician
- Graham Lewis (footballer) (born 1982), English footballer
- Graham Leydin (born 1940), Australian rules footballer
- Graham Liggins (1926–2010), New Zealand medical scientist
- Graham Lindsey (born 1978), American singer, songwriter and musician
- Graham Linehan (born 1968), Irish writer and anti-transgender activist
- Graham Lintott (born 1955), New Zealand Air Force commander
- Graham Liptrot (born 1955), English rugby league footballer
- Graham Little (born 1978), Northern Irish television presenter and journalist
- Graham Loomes (born 1950), British economist and academic
- Graham Lord (1943–2015), British bibliographer and novelist
- Graham Loud (born 1953), English professor and historian
- Graham Love (born 1954), British chief executive officer
- Graham Lovett (1947–2018), English footballer
- Graham Lovett (tennis) (1936–1999), Australian tennis player
- Graham Lowe (born 1946), New Zealand rugby league coach and administrator
- Graham Ludlow, Canadian actor, executive, screenwriter and producer
- Graham Lusk (1866–1932), American physiologist and nutritionist
- Graham Lyle (born 1944), Scottish singer-songwriter, guitarist and producer
- Graham Lyons (born 1969), Indigenous Australian rugby league footballer

=== M ===
- Graham Maby (born 1952), English bass guitar player
- Graham MacGregor, British academic
- Graham MacGregor Bull (1918–1987), South African-British physician, nephrologist, medical administrator and director of medical research
- Graham Mackay (born 1968), Australian rugby league footballer
- Graham Mackay (businessman) (1949–2013), South African businessman
- Graham MacKinnon (1916–1992), Australian politician
- Graham Macky (born 1954), New Zealand long-distance runner
- Graham Maguire (born 1945), Australian politician
- Graham Maitland (1879–1914), English rower
- Graham Malcolm Wilson (1917–1977), British physician, professor of medicine and pioneer of clinical pharmacology
- Graham Mander (1931–2021), New Zealand yachtsman
- Graham Manley (born 1946), British comic artist
- Graham Mann (1924–2000), British competitive sailor
- Graham Manou (born 1979), Australian cricketer
- Graham March (1925–2016), Australian rules footballer
- Graham Marsh (born 1944), Australian golfer
- Graham Marsh (producer) (born 1979), American record producer, recording engineer and multi-instrumental
- Graham Marshall (disambiguation), multiple people
- Graham Martin (1912–1990), American diplomat
- Graham Massey (born 1960), British record producer, musician and remixer
- Graham Masterton (born 1946), British author
- Graham Mather (born 1954), British politician
- Graham Matters (1948–2021), Australian actor and musician
- Graham Matthews (born 1942), English footballer
- Graham Matthews (cricketer) (born 1953), Australian cricketer
- Graham Mattson, New Zealand rugby league footballer
- Graham Maxwell (1921–2010), English theologian and professor
- Graham May (1952–2006), New Zealand weightlifter
- Graham McCamley (born 1932), Australian cattle baron
- Graham McCann, British author and historian
- Graham McColl (1934–2022), Australian rules footballer
- Graham McCready, New Zealand accountant
- Graham McGhee (born 1981), Scottish footballer
- Graham McGrath (born 1971), English actor
- Graham McGregor (politician) (born 1993), Canadian politician
- Graham McIlvaine (born 1992), American volleyball player
- Graham McIntosh (born 1944), South African farmer, businessman and politician
- Graham McKee (born 1980), Irish bowler
- Graham McKenzie (born 1941), Australian cricketer
- Graham McKenzie (fencer) (1934–1995), Australian fencer
- Graham McKenzie-Smith, Australian historian and forester
- Graham McMillan (born 1936), Australian footballer
- Graham McNamee (1888–1942), American radio broadcaster
- Graham McNeill, British novelist and video game writer
- Graham McPherson (born 1961), better known as Suggs, English singer-songwriter, musician, radio personality and actor
- Graham McRae (1940–2021), New Zealand racing driver
- Graham McTavish (born 1961), Scottish actor and author
- Graham McVilly (1948–2002), Australian racing cyclist
- Graham Medley (born 1961), British professor of infectious disease
- Graham Melrose (born 1949), Australian rules footballer
- Graham Mertz (born 2000), American football player
- Graham Mexted (1927–2009), New Zealand rugby union player
- Graham Middleton (1950–2011), Australian rules footballer
- Graham Miles (1941–2014), English snooker player
- Graham Miller (disambiguation), multiple people
- Graham Mills (1917–1992), British Army officer
- Graham Minihan (1934–1991), Australian rules footballer
- Graham Mink (born 1979), American ice hockey player
- Graham Mitchell (disambiguation), multiple people
- Graham Moffat (1866–1951), Scottish actor, director, playwright and spiritualist
- Graham Moffatt (1919–1965), English character actor
- Graham Molloy (born 1947), Australian rules footballer
- Graham Monkhouse (born 1954), English cricketer
- Graham Montrose, a pseudonym of Charles Roy MacKinnon (1924–2005)
- Graham Moodie (born 1981), Scottish field hockey player
- Graham Moore (disambiguation), multiple people
- Graham Morgan (disambiguation), multiple people
- Graham Morris (born 1964), British diver
- Graham Mort, British writer, editor and tutor
- Graham Moseley (born 1953), English footballer
- Graham Moss (born 1950), Australian rules footballer
- Graham Moughton (born 1948), English boxer
- Graham Mourie (born 1952), New Zealand rugby union footballer
- Graham Murawsky (born 1982), better known as Factor Chandelier, Canadian underground hip hop producer
- Graham Murray (1955–2013), Australian rugby league footballer
- Graham Murray (born 1976), New Zealand cricketer
- Graham Mylne (1834–1876), Australian politician and pastoralist

=== N ===
- Graham Napier (born 1980), English cricketer
- Graham Nash (born 1942), English-American musician, singer and songwriter
- Graham Neff (born 1983), American athletics director
- Graham Nelson (born 1968), British mathematician and poet
- Graham Nerlich (1929–2022), Australian philosopher
- Graham Nesbitt (born 1983), British basketball player
- Graham Newberry (born 1998), British figure skater
- Graham C. Newbury (1910–1985), American general surgeon
- Graham Newcater (born 1941), South African composer
- Graham Newdick (1949–2020), New Zealand cricketer
- Graham S. Newell (1915–2008), American politician
- Graham Newton (1942–2019), English footballer and manager
- Graham Nicholls (born 1975), British author, installation artist and speaker
- Graham Nicholson (born 2002), American football player
- Graham Nickson (born 1946), British artist
- Graham Nicol (1907–1990), Australian politician
- Graham Nolan (born 1962), American comic book artist
- Graham Norris (1905–1933), English cricketer
- Graham Norton (disambiguation), multiple people
- Graham Noyce (born 1957), English motocross racer
- Graham Numa (born 1954), Papuan windsurfer

=== O ===
- Graham Oakey (born 1954), English footballer
- Graham Oakley (1929–2022), English writer and illustrator
- Graham Oates (disambiguation), multiple people
- Graham Oberlin-Brown (born 1988), New Zealand rower
- Graham Oddie, New Zealand philosopher
- Graham Ogden (born 1938), Australian biblical scholar
- Graham Oliver (born 1952), English guitarist
- Graham Olling (born 1948), Australian rugby league footballer
- Graham Onions (born 1982), English cricketer
- Graham Oppy (born 1960), Australian philosopher
- Graham Ord (born 1961), English musician and songwriter
- Graham Osborne (disambiguation), multiple people
- Graham Ousey, American sociologist and criminologist
- Graham Ovenden (1943–2022), English painter, photographer and writer
- Graham Oxenden (1802–1826), English cricketer

=== P ===
- Graham Pace, American baseball player
- Graham Paddon (1950–2007), English footballer
- Graham Page (1911–1981), British solicitor, businessman and politician
- Graham Page (footballer) (born 1950), Australian rules footballer
- Graham Palmer (1921–1994), British sprint canoeist
- Graham Panckhurst (born 1945), New Zealand judge
- Graham Parish (1912–1942), English soldier
- Graeme Parker (born 1982), Scottish cattle hoof trimmer and YouTuber
- Graham Parker (born 1950), English singer-songwriter
- Graham Parkes (born 1949), philosopher and professor
- Graham Parkhurst (born 1987), Canadian actor
- Graham Patrick Martin (born 1991), American actor
- Graham Paul (born 1947), British fencer
- Graham Pauley (born 2000), American baseball player
- Graham Payn (1918–2005), South African-born English actor and singer
- Graham Pearce (disambiguation), multiple people
- Graham Peck (1930–2015), Australian rules footballer
- Graham Peel (1877–1937), English composer
- Graham Percy (1938–2008), New Zealand-born artist, designer and illustrator
- Graham Perkin (1929–1975), Australian journalist and newspaper editor
- Graham Perrett (born 1966), Australian politician
- Graham T. Perry (1894–1960), American attorney
- Graham Petrie (disambiguation), multiple people
- Graham Philip (born 1960), New Zealand conspiracy theorist and convicted criminal
- Graham Phillips (disambiguation), multiple people
- Graham Pink (1929–2021), English nurse and whistleblower
- Graham Pizzey (1930–2001), Australian author, photographer and ornithologist
- Graham Plant (born 1949), English motorcycle speedway rider
- Graham Platner (born 1984), American politician, farmer and veteran
- Graham Polak (born 1984), Australian rules footballer
- Graham Poll (born 1963), English football referee
- Graham Pollard (1903–1976), British bookseller and bibliographer
- Graham Pointer (born 1967), English cricketer
- Graham Potter (born 1975), English football manager and player
- Graham Pountney (born 1953), British actor
- Graham Pratten (1899–1977), Australian politician
- Graham Preskett, British composer
- Graham Price (born 1951), Welsh rugby union player
- Graham Priest (born 1948), English professor and philosopher
- Graham Primrose (born 1939), Australian tennis player
- Graham Pritchard (1942–2019), English cricketer
- Graham Pugh (born 1948), English footballer
- Graham Pulkingham (1926–1993), American rector
- Graham B. Purcell Jr. (1919–2011), American politician
- Graham Purvis (born 1961), New Zealand rugby union player
- Graham Pushee (born 1954), Australian countertenor

=== Q ===
- Graham Quinn (disambiguation), multiple people
- Graham Quirk (born c. 1958), Australian politician

=== R ===
- Graham Ragsdale (born 1969), Canadian soldier
- Graham Rahal (born 1989), American race car driver and small business owner
- Graham Ramshaw (1945–2006), Australian rules footballer
- Graham Rathbone (1942–2012), Welsh footballer
- Graham Rawle, British writer and artist
- Graham Reed (disambiguation), multiple people
- Graham Rees (1936–1987), Welsh rugby union and rugby league footballer
- Graham Reid (disambiguation), multiple people
- Graham Reilly, British composer
- Graham Rennison (born 1978), English footballer
- Graham Renshaw (1872–1952), British physician and biologist
- Graham Reynolds (disambiguation), multiple people
- Graham Richard, American politician and entrepreneur
- Graham Richards (born 1939), English chemist
- Graham Richardson (1949–2025), Australian politician
- Graham Richardson (journalist) (born 1970), Canadian television journalist
- Graham Ricketts (1939–2000), English footballer
- Graham Riddick (born 1955), English politician
- Graham Ritchie (born 1998), Canadian cross-country skier
- Graham Rix (born 1957), English footballer
- Graham Robb (born 1958), British author and critic
- Graham Robbins (born 1949), Australian rules footballer
- Graham Robbins (rugby union) (born 1956), English rugby union player
- Graham Roberts (born 1959), English footballer
- Graham Roberts (actor) (1929–2004), English actor
- Graham Robertson (disambiguation), multiple people
- Graham Roblin (1937–2005), British chaplain
- Graham Rodger (born 1967), English football coach, player and scout
- Graham Rogers (disambiguation), multiple people
- Graham Roger Serjeant (born 1938), British medical researcher
- Graham Roland, American writer and producer
- Graham Roope (1946–2006), English cricketer
- Graham Roos (born 1966), British director, producer, writer and performer
- Graham Rose (disambiguation), multiple people
- Graham Ross (disambiguation), multiple people
- Graham Roumieu, Canadian illustrator
- Graham Rowe (born 1945), English footballer
- Graham Rowlands (born 1947), Australian poet
- Graham Rowley (cyclist) (born 1940), Australian racing cyclist
- Graham Rowntree (born 1971), English rugby union footballer
- Graham Russell (born 1950), English musician, singer-songwriter, producer and guitarist
- Graham Russell Gao Hodges, professor
- Graham Russell Mitchell (1905–1984), British security officer
- Graham Rust (born 1942), English painter and muralist
- Graham Ryan (1940–2010), Australian rules footballer
- Graham Ryder (1949–2002), English geologist and lunar scientist
- Graham Ryding (born 1975), Canadian squash player

=== S ===
- Graham Salisbury (born 1944), American children's writer
- Graham Salmon (1954–1999), British athlete
- Graham Sandley, English tennis player
- Graham Savage (1886–1981), English civil servant
- Graham Saville (born 1944), English cricketer
- Graham Savin (born 1964), English cricketer
- Graham Savory (born 1960), English athlete
- Graham Scambler (born 1948), sociologist
- Graham Schodde (born 1958), Australian rules footballer
- Graham Schweig, American theological scholar
- Graham Scott (disambiguation), multiple people
- Graham Seed (born 1950), English actor
- Graham Seers (born 1958), Australian road cyclist and cycling administrator
- Graham Selby Wilson (1895–1987), British bacteriologist
- Graham Seton Hutchison (1890–1946), British Army officer, military theorist, author and fascist activist
- Graham Settree, rugby league footballer
- Graham Shadwell (born 1975), English bowls player
- Graham Shannon (1869–1912), New Zealand rugby union player
- Graham Sharman (born 1938), English cricketer and squash player
- Graham Sharp (1917–1995), British figure skater
- Graham Shaw (disambiguation), multiple people
- Graham Sheen (born 1952), British bassoonist, teacher, composer and arranger
- Graham Sheffield (born 1952), British art director
- Graham Shelby (1939–2016), British historical novelist
- Graham Shepard (1907–1943), English illustrator and cartoonist
- Graham Sherren (born 1937), British publisher
- Graham Shiel (born 1970), Scottish skills coach
- Graham Shields, British public servant
- Graham Shillington (1911–2001), Northern Irish police officer
- Graham Shirley, Australian author, researcher, curator and filmmaker
- Graham Short (born 1946), English micro-artist
- Graham Simpson (disambiguation), multiple people
- Graham Sims (born 1951), New Zealand rugby union player
- Graham Sissons (born 1934), English footballer
- Graham Skidmore (1931–2021), British voice artist and game show announcer
- Graham Skinner (born 1945), British Air Force officer
- Graham Skinner (cricketer) (1910–1997), English cricketer
- Graham Skipper (born 1983), American actor, director and screenwriter
- Graham Sleight (born 1972), British writer, editor and critic
- Graham Sligo (born 1954), New Zealand field hockey player
- Graham Smith (disambiguation), multiple people
- Graham Smorgon, Australian businessman
- Graham Snelding (born 1972), American football coach
- Graham Southern (born 1960), English art dealer and gallery owner
- Graham Southernwood (born 1971), English rugby league footballer
- Graham Spanier (born 1948), South African-born American sociologist and university administrator
- Graham Speake (born 1946), British classical philologist
- Graham Speight (born 1921–2008), New Zealand judge
- Graham Spiers, Scottish sports journalist
- Graham Spooner (1933–2015), Australian rules footballer
- Graham Spring (born 1961), Australian cricketer
- Graham Spry (1900–1983), Canadian broadcasting pioneer, business executive, diplomat and socialist
- Graham Stabell, Australian racing cyclist
- Graham Stacey (born 1959), English Royal Air Force officer
- Graham Stack (disambiguation), multiple people
- Graham Staines (1941–1999), Australian Christian missionary
- Graham Standing (1860–1909), English rugby union player
- Graham Stanford (born 1948), Australian cricketer
- Graham Stanley (1938–1997), English footballer
- Graham Stanton (1940–2009), New Zealand biblical scholar
- Graham Stark (1922–2013), English comedian, actor, writer and director
- Graham Steadman (born 1961), English rugby league footballer
- Graham Steele (born 1964), Canadian lawyer, author and politician
- Graham Steele (American attorney), American attorney and policy advisor
- Graham Steell (1851–1942), Scottish physician and cardiologist
- Graham Stevenson (1955–2014), English cricketer
- Graham Stevenson (trade union leader) (1950–2020), British communist, trade union leader and writer
- Graham Stewart (born 1975), Scottish broadcaster
- Graham Stilwell (1945–2019), British tennis player
- Graham Stirk (born 1957), English architect
- Graham Stirrup (born 1949), informally known as Jock Stirrup, British Royal Air Force commander
- Graham Stokoe (born 1975), English footballer
- Graham Stoker, British sports barrister and motor sport executive
- Graham Stokes (disambiguation), multiple people
- Graham Storer, New Zealand footballer
- Graham Strange (born 1968), Bermudian cricketer
- Graham Streeter (born 1964), American film director, screenwriter and cinematographer
- Graham Stringer (born 1950), British politician
- Graham Stuart (disambiguation), multiple people
- Graham Stuart Thomas (1909–2003), English horticulturist
- Graham Sucha (born 1986), Canadian politician
- Graham Sutherland (1903–1980), English artist
- Graham Sutton (1903–1977), Welsh mathematician and meteorologist
- Graham Sutton (musician) (born 1972), English musician and record producer
- Graham Swanwick (1906–2003), British barrister and judge
- Graham Sweet (born 1948), British bobsledder
- Graham Swift (born 1949), English writer
- Graham Sycamore (born 1941/42), New Zealand cyclist, commissaire and city councilor
- Graham Sykes (1937–2008), English swimmer
- Graham Symonds (1937–2006), English swimmer

=== T ===
- Graham Tainton (born 1927), Swedish dancer and choreographer
- Graham Tardif (born 1957), Australian screen music composer
- Graham Tatters (born 1985), Scottish footballer
- Graham Taylor (disambiguation), multiple people
- Graham Teasdale (born 1955), Australian rules footballer
- Graham Teasdale (physician) (born 1940), English neurosurgeon
- Graham Thomas (athlete) (1931–1998), Australian middle-distance runner
- Graham Thompson (disambiguation), multiple people
- Graham Thomson Lyall (1892–1941), English-born soldier
- Graham Thornicroft, British psychiatrist, researcher and professor
- Graham Thorpe (1969–2024), English cricketer
- Graham Thurgood, American linguist
- Graham Tilby, British advisor
- Graham Tomlin (born 1958), British theologian, author and bishop
- Graham Tope, Baron Tope (born 1943), British politician
- Graham Torrington (born 1960), British radio presenter and broadcaster
- Graham Toulmin (born 1948), Australian dentist and musician
- Graham Towers (1897–1975), Canadian banker
- Graham Townsend (1942–1998), Canadian fiddler, mandolin player, pianist and composer
- Graham Tripp (born 1932), English cricketer
- Graham Troyer (born 1983), better known as Baracuda, Canadian rapper
- Graham Tuckwell, Australian businessman and philanthropist
- Graham Tudor (1920–1999), Australian rules footballer
- Graham Turbott (1914–2014), New Zealand ornithologist, zoologist and museum administrator
- Graham Turner (born 1947), English footballer and manager
- Graham Turnock, British physicist
- Graham Tutt (1956–2022), English footballer
- Graham Twelftree (born 1950), Australian biblical scholar

=== U ===
- Graham Upton (1944–2007), British educator
- Graham Urwin (born 1949), English footballer
- Graham Usher (disambiguation), multiple people

=== V ===
- Graham Van Pelt, Canadian musician
- Graham Vearncombe (1934–1992), Welsh footballer
- Graham Verchere (born 2002), Canadian actor
- Graham Vick (1953–2021), English opera director
- Graham Vigrass (born 1989), Canadian volleyball player
- Graham Vines (born 1930), British cyclist
- Graham Virgo (born 1966), English legal academic, barrister and university administrator
- Graham Vivian (born 1946), New Zealand cricketer
- Graham Vowell (1895–1963), American football player

=== W ===
- Graham Waddell (1877–1960), Australian politician
- Graham Wade (1931–2009), Australian cartoonist, filmmaker and communicator
- Graham Wagg (born 1983), English cricketer
- Graham Walden (1931–2017), Australian Anglican bishop
- Graham Walker (disambiguation), multiple people
- Graham Wallas (1858–1932), English socialist, social psychologist and educationalist
- Graham Walne (born 1947), British theatre consultant, lighting designer, author and lecturer
- Graham Walters (born 1953), Welsh rugby union and rugby league footballer
- Graham Ward (disambiguation), multiple people
- Graham Wardle (born 1986), Canadian actor, filmmaker and photographer
- Graham Warner (born 1945), English cricketer
- Graham Warren (1926–2005), Australian motorcycle speedway rider
- Graham Watanabe (born 1982), American snowboarder
- Graham Waterhouse (born 1962), English composer and cellist
- Graham Watson (disambiguation), multiple people
- Graham Watt (born 1976), Australian politician
- Graham Wattley (1930–2017), British government worker
- Graham Webb (1944–2017), English racing cyclist
- Graham Webb (broadcaster) (1936–2024), Australian broadcaster and producer
- Graham Webster (disambiguation), multiple people
- Graham Weir (born 1984), Scottish footballer
- Graham Welbourn (born 1961), Canadian swimmer
- Graham Wellesley, 8th Earl Cowley (born 1965), British hereditary peer and businessman
- Graham West (born 1973), Australian politician
- Graham Westbrook Rowley (1912–2003), English Arctic explorer
- Graham Westley (born 1968), English football manager and player
- Graham Whaling, American businessman and conservative donor
- Graham Whelan, Irish criminal
- Graham Whettam (1927–2007), English composer
- Graham White (disambiguation), multiple people
- Graham Whitehead (1922–1981), British racing driver
- Graham Whitford (born 1938), Australian cricketer
- Graham Whiting (born 1946), New Zealand rugby footballer
- Graham Whittle (born 1953), English footballer
- Graham Whyte (born 1952), Australian cricketer
- Graham Wiggins (1962–2016), American musician and scientist
- Graham Wilkins (born 1955), English footballer
- Graham Williams (disambiguation), multiple people
- Graham Williamson, British political activist
- Graham Williamson (athlete) (born 1960), Scottish athlete
- Graham Wilson (disambiguation), multiple people
- Graham Windeatt (born 1954), Australian swimmer
- Graham Winstanley (born 1948), English footballer
- Graham Winter (born 1955), Australian cricketer
- Graham Winteringham (1923–2023), English architect
- Graham Winyard (born 1947), British public health physician
- Graham Wise (born 1942), Australian rules footballer
- Graham Withey (born 1960), English footballer
- Graham Witney (1934–2008), South African cricketer
- Graham Wood (disambiguation), multiple people
- Graham Woodrup (1946–1992), Australian cyclist
- Graham Woodwark (1874–1938), English politician
- Graham Wright (born 1968), Australian rules footballer
- Graham Wylie (born 1959), British businessman

=== Y ===
- Graham Yallop (born 1952), Australian cricketer
- Graham Yost (born 1959), Canadian screenwriter
- Graham Young (1947–1990), English serial killer

=== Z ===
- Graham Zanker (born 1947), professor
- Graham Zug (born 1987), American football player
- Graham Zusi (born 1986), American soccer player
