= Graham Usher =

Graham Usher may refer to:

- Graham Usher (dancer) (1938–1975), ballet dancer with the Royal Ballet
- Graham Usher (journalist) (1958-2013), foreign correspondent who covered Palestine, Pakistan, and the United Nations
- Graham Usher (bishop) (born 1970), Anglican bishop and ecologist
- Graham Usher (darts player) (born 1973), English professional darts player

== See also ==
- Usher (surname)
