= Graeme Lee =

Graeme Lee may refer to:

- Graeme Lee (Australian footballer) (1939-2021), Australian rules player
- Graeme Lee (footballer, born 1978), English association football player
- Graeme Lee (politician) (born 1935), New Zealand politician

== See also ==
- Graham Lee (disambiguation)
