= Graham Bennett =

Graham Bennett may refer to:

- Graham Bennett (costume designer) (1933–2004), Australian production and costume designer, teacher and artist
- Graham Bennett (sculptor) (born 1947), New Zealand sculptor
