= Graham Osborne =

Graham Osborne may refer to:

- Graham Osborne (footballer, born 1947), Australian rules footballer for Melbourne
- Graham Osborne (footballer, born 1963), Australian rules footballer for Fitzroy
