= Graham Simpson =

Graham Simpson may refer to:

- Graham Simpson (doctor), practitioner of proactive medicine and founding member of American Holistic Medical Association
- Graham Simpson (musician) (1943–2012), founding member and bassist of Roxy Music
- Graham Simpson (politician) (born 1972), Scottish politician
- Graham Simpson (badminton) (born 1979), Scottish badminton player
