= Graham Hurst =

Graham Hurst may refer to:

- Graham Hurst (cricketer) (born 1960), former English cricketer
- Graham Hurst (footballer) (born 1967), English former footballer
