= Graham Thompson =

Graham Thompson may refer to:

- Graham Thompson (footballer) (born 1936), Australian rules footballer
- Graham Thompson (swimmer) (born 1964), Zimbabwean swimmer
