= Graham Barnett =

Graham Barnett is the name of:

- Graham Barnett (footballer) (1936–2019), English footballer
- Graham Barnett (priest) (born 1885), New Zealand priest
