= Graham James =

Graham James may refer to:

- Graham James (bishop) (born 1951), retired British Anglican bishop
- Graham James (ice hockey) (born 1952), former Canadian ice hockey coach and convicted sex offender
