= Graham Hogg =

Graham Hogg may refer to:

- Graham Hogg (Royal Navy officer) (1921–1942), British flying ace of the Royal Navy's Fleet Air Arm during the Second World War
- Graham Hogg (rugby union, born 1948), Scottish rugby union international wing
- Graham Hogg (rugby union, born 1987), Scottish rugby union fly-half or centre and rugby sevens international, brother of Stuart Hogg
