= Graham Lee =

Graham Lee may refer to:

- Graham Lee (jockey) (born 1975), Irish jockey
- Graham Lee (musician) (born 1953), Australian rock guitarist

== See also ==
- Graeme Lee (disambiguation)
