= Graeme Watson =

Graeme or Graham Watson may refer to:

- Graham Watson (born 1956), British politician
- Graeme Watson (cricketer) (1945-2020), Australian professional cricketer and Australian footballer
- Graham Watson (footballer, born 1949), English footballer (Doncaster Rovers, Cambridge United)
- Graham Watson (footballer, born 1970), Scottish footballer (Aberdeen FC)
- Graeme Watson (footballer) (born 1986), Scottish footballer (Airdrie United)
- Graham Watson (motorsport) (born 1967), New Zealand-born Italian Formula One engineer
