= Graham Rogers =

Graham Rogers may refer to:

- Graham Rogers (footballer), Welsh footballer
- Graham Rogers (actor) (born 1990), American actor

== See also ==
- Graham Rodger (born 1967), Scottish-born English professional footballer and football manager
