= Graham Zanker =

Classicist

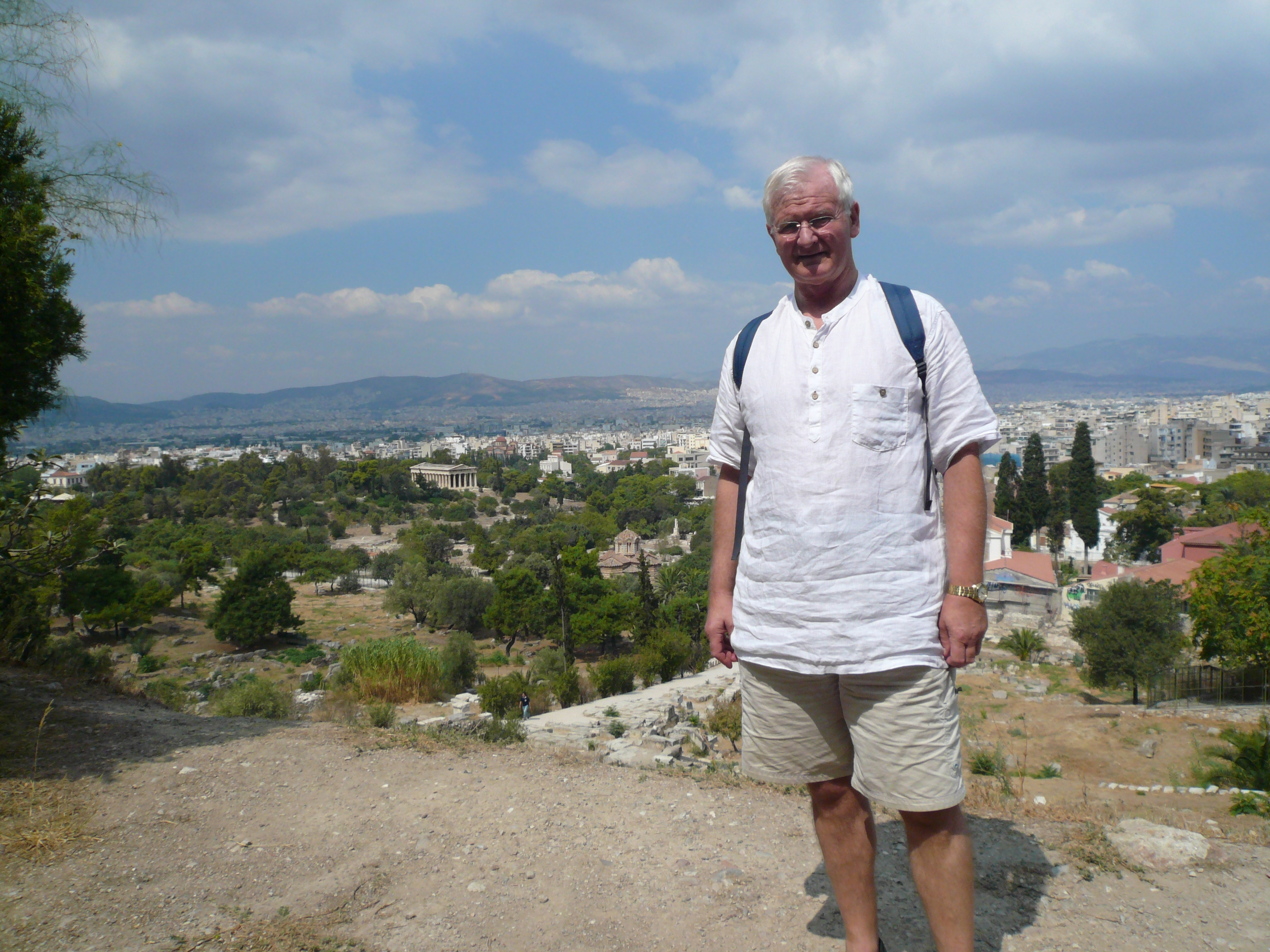
Zanker in Athens, Greece

Graham Zanker (born 16 December 1947) is Emeritus Professor of Classics at the University of Canterbury and an affiliate at the University of Adelaide.

He has published widely on Hellenistic poetry and art, Homeric ethics, and Virgilian epic.

== Education ==
Zanker received his B.A. from the University of Adelaide before proceeding to Gonville and Caius College, Cambridge, where he was awarded a Ph.D. in Classical Philology.

He has undertaken research at the universities of Cambridge, Oxford, Tübingen, Heidelberg, and Cincinnati, and been a resident scholar at the Fondation Hardt (Geneva), Center for Hellenic Studies, Institute of Classical Studies. He has also been an academic visitor at the Institute for Advanced Study.

== Career ==
Zanker's first book, Realism in Alexandrian Poetry: A Literature and Its Audience (1987), was a groundbreaking investigation of the interrelation of Hellenistic poetry and art. Zanker then moved to Homeric ethics in The Heart of Achilles: Characterization and Personal Ethics in the Iliad (1994), amending the schematic view of the psychological drives behind the behavior of the Homeric heroes by (e.g.) focusing on the reconciliation scene between Achilles and Priam in Iliad 24. He then returned to the interaction of Hellenistic art and literature in Modes of Viewing in Hellenistic Poetry and Art (2004). He has recently written on Stoic fate in Virgil's Aeneid.

He has also translated Thomas Szlezak's Platon Lesen (Reading Plato, 2005), and authored an edition, translation, and commentary to Herodas’ Mimiambs (2009).

Zanker is currently working on a collaboration on Ch. G. Heyne's De Genio Saeculi Ptolemaeorum (1763), establishing its place in modern concepts of Hellenistic civilization.

== Selected publications ==
- Zanker, Graham (1987). Realism in Alexandrian Poetry: A Literature and Its Audience. Croom Helm. ISBN 978-0-7099-3005-1.
- Zanker, Graham (1996). The Heart of Achilles: Characterization and Personal Ethics in the Iliad. University of Michigan Press. ISBN 978-0-472-08400-5.
- Zanker, Graham (2004). Modes of Viewing in Hellenistic Poetry and Art. Univ of Wisconsin Press. ISBN 978-0-299-19453-6.
- Zanker, Graham (2009). Herodas: Mimiambs. Liverpool University Press. ISBN 9780856688836.
- Zanker, Graham (2023). Fate and the Hero in Virgil's Aeneid; Stoic World Fate and Human Responsibility. Cambridge University Press. ISBN 9781009319850.
