= Graham Bennett (costume designer) =

Australian costume designer (1933–2004)

Graham Stewart Bennett (16 December 1933 – 5 November 2004) was an Australian production and costume designer, teacher and artist who worked unofficially with Oscar winner John Truscott and later, as a teacher, inspired Oscar winner Adam Elliot.

== Biography ==
He attended Scotch College from 1945 to 1949, then studied art and design at RMIT, then taught in secondary schools in Melbourne and Hamilton. While working by day at Broadmeadows Technical College, he worked at night with his flatmate Truscott on the Melbourne production of Camelot, then the British premiere and then the 1967 movie Camelot.

Bennett relied on "a semi-abstract feel" for the set and costume design. "The movie was not to have anything that was referenced to any historical period," he says. "I saw the movie a few weeks ago, and even today, it's very modern, a lot of the design work." For the movie, Bennett designed furnishings such as curtains, and tapestries, the patterns on women's costumes and men's jackets, and King Arthur and Guinevere's crowns.

Bennett was unable to share the recognition with John Truscott on the Oscar-winning art direction and costume design in Camelot in 1967. He was not invited to the ceremony as he did not have a green card he was working illegally in the USA, and could not formally share the awards. "I was sitting at home in Burbank, watching with the wardrobe lady, and we drank champagne, and when John (Truscott) came home, we drank another bottle of champagne. And the next morning at breakfast, we had the Oscars just sitting there, next to the pepper and salt." Bennett said, "Every time I see it [Camelot], I see something that I haven't seen before in the detail."

The Oscar statuettes were bequeathed to him by Truscott. Bennett was an art teacher at Haileybury College from 1969 to 1989. He took one of the statuettes to class, where Adam Elliot, a student, was allowed to hold it. When Elliot completed his short animated film, Harvie Krumpet, he showed it to Bennett and sought his advice, and later wrote to thank him for his guidance and inspiration before going to Hollywood, where he won his own Oscar.

Elliot also thanked him again in his dedication to Mary and Max "To Graham Bennett, Thank you for opening my eyes and allowing my creative juices to flow". "He [Adam Elliot] was a very shy, very quiet and a very gentle boy," Mr Bennett says. "But he had a dark but gentle sense of humour. He was always doing cartoons."

He inherited Truscott's Oscars and donated them to The Arts Centre in Melbourne. There are more visible signs of his achievements, such as the curtains he designed that hang in the State Theatre and Melbourne Town Hall. His most enduring legacy is the inspiration and guidance he offered to the boys in his classroom.

He also provided advice on the 2004 Melbourne revival of Camelot. The director Darren Sticklen said: "We were looking at the first scene together, which is a snow scene, and he said, 'While it's lovely to go for those cooler colours, make sure that you have some touches of warmer colour in there, to ensure that it's beautiful'."
