= Graham Gotch =

Australian rules footballer

Personal information
- Full name: Graham Gotch
- Born: 6 August 1936
- Died: 5 October 2011 (aged 75)
- Height: 178 cm (5 ft 10 in)
- Weight: 79 kg (174 lb)

Playing career^{1}
| Years | Club | Games (Goals) |
| 1956–60 | Fitzroy | 52 (39) |
- ^{1} Playing statistics correct to the end of 1960.

Graham Gotch (6 August 1936 – 5 October 2011) was a former Australian rules footballer who played with Fitzroy in the Victorian Football League (VFL).
