= Graham Petrie =

Graham Petrie may refer to:

- Graham Petrie (artist) (1859–1940), British artist
- Graham Petrie (writer) (1939–2023), Malaysian-born Scottish-Canadian writer
