= Graham Everett =

American artist (born 1947)

- Born: December 23, 1947 (age 78); Oceanside, New York, U.S.
- Occupations: Poet, professor, publisher, musician, artist
- Awards: Long Island Poet of the Year (2015)

Academic background
- Education: Canisius College (BA); State University of New York at Stony Brook (MA, PhD)

Academic work
- Discipline: English
- Institutions: State University of New York at Stony Brook; Adelphi University

Graham Everett (born December 23, 1947) is an American poet, professor, publisher, musician, and artist.

== Early life and education ==
Everett was born in Oceanside, New York, the second son, third child of James H. and Jacqueline (Vaughan) Everett. He received a bachelor's degree in English from Canisius College, and a master's degree and doctorate in English from the State University of New York at Stony Brook.

He married Elyse Arnow in 1981. They have a son, Logan.

== Career ==
Everett founded Street Press in 1974 and published books, chapbooks, and broadsides for a variety of poets, mostly from Long Island, including Vince Clemente, Michelle Cusumano, Richard Elman, Ray Freed, Dan Giancola, Jack Micheline, Annabelle Moseley, Dan Murray, Allen Planz, R.B. Weber, and Claire White. He was also the founding editor of Street magazine.

Everett served as the interim director of the Poetry Center at the State University of New York at Stony Brook.

Everett was a faculty member in the General Studies Program at Adelphi University, where he taught classes in critical reading and writing, expository writing, and the world of ideas. He was named Long Island Poet of the Year by the Walt Whitman Birthplace Association in 2015.

In 1996, he joined the poetry band Middle Class, with Everett on microphone, Janene Gentile on bass, Demoy Shilling on guitar, and Raymond Kruse on drums. Everett wrote the lyrics to their songs. The name of the band was a nod to the group members' economic class and middle age.

As an artist, Everett is a collagist and a prolific producer of mail art.

In 2006 he donated his archive to Stony Brook University.

== Bibliography ==
=== Poetry collections ===
- Casting Bones from a Turtle Shell, Street Press, 1977
- Rural Gardenia, TK Press, 1977
- Nothing Left to Fake: A Great American 4 Page Novel, The Black Hole School of Poethnics, 1978
- The Trees, Street Press, 1978
- Strange Coast, Tamarack Editions, 1979
- The Sunlit Sidewalk, Tamarack Editions, 1985
- Minus Green, Yank This Press, 1992
- Minus Green Plus, Breeze/Street Press, 1995
- The Doc Fayth Poems, Street Press/Mongrel, 1998
- Corps Calleux, Street Press, 2000
- That Nod Toward Love: New Poems, Street Press, 2006
- An Incomplete Dictionary of Disappearing Things, Street Press, 2012
- Living With Others, Street Press, 2015
- Just This Very World, Street Press, 2020

=== Broadsides ===
- "Trees," Street Press, 1976
- "Farewell to the Decade & Liberty Avenue," Black Hole School of Poethnics, 1980
- "Letter to Everywoman," Banjo Press, 1978
- "This Could Be Plutonium," Ukulele Press, 1978
- "Winding the Alarm Clock," Banjo Press, 1979
- "Facing 1984" (private, 1984)
- ”Here Goes,” Robber Baron Broadside, 2018
- ”The Widening Gyre Before Swooping,” Clasex Press Broadsides, 2018
- ”Once More,” Robber Baron Press, 2020

=== Co-edited anthologies ===
- Paumanok Rising: An Anthology of Eastern Long Island Aesthetics, edited by Vince Clemente and Graham Everett et al. NY: Street Press, 1982
- Writing Workshop Anthology No. 1, edited by Allen Planz and Graham Everett. Backstreet Editions, 1982.
- The Light of City and Sea: An Anthology of Suffolk County Poetry, edited by Daniel Thomas Moran, et al. Street Press, 2006.
