= Graham Black =

Australian cricketer (1924–2007)

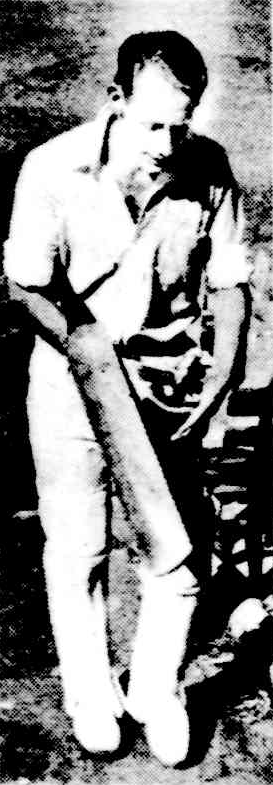

Personal information
- Full name: Graham Ash Black
- Born: 14 May 1924; Unley, Adelaide, South Australia
- Died: 9 July 2007 (aged 83); Adelaide, South Australia
- Batting: Right-handed
- Role: Batsman

Domestic team information
- Years: Team
- 1949/50–1950/51: South Australia

Career statistics
Competition	First-class
Matches	6
Runs scored	115
Batting average	11.50
100s/50s	0/0
Top score	33
Catches/stumpings	1/–
- Source: Cricinfo, 1 May 2018

Graham Ash Black (14 May 1924 – 9 July 2007) was an Australian cricketer. He played six first-class matches for South Australia, four in 1949–50 and two during the following season.
