= Graham Norton (disambiguation) =

Graham Norton (born 1963) is an Irish television and radio presenter.

Graham or Graeme Norton may also refer to:

- Graham Norton (Gaelic footballer), Irish Gaelic football player
- Graeme Norton, New Zealand rugby league player and coach
