= Graham Ball =

Graham Ball may refer to:

- Graham Ball (presenter) (born 1938), English television personality known as Johnny Ball
- Graham Ball, candidate in Ottawa-Carleton Regional Municipality elections, 1994
