= Graham Pearce =

Graham Pearce may refer to:

- Graham Pearce (English footballer) (born 1963), English association football player who played for Brighton and Hove Albion in the 1983 FA Cup Final
- Graham Pearce (New Zealand footballer), New Zealand international association football player
- Graham F. Pearce, Australian humanitarian, namesake of The Graham F. Smith Peace Foundation

== See also ==
- Pearce (disambiguation)
