= Graham Horrex =

English cricketer (born 1932)

Graham Wade Horrex (born 27 December 1932) was an English cricketer. He was a right-handed batsman who played for Essex. He was born in Goodmayes, Essex.

Horrex's career began in 1956, when he debuted for Essex against Kent. However, he was unable to get a first-team place following a duck and an innings defeat in two consecutive matches. He returned briefly at the beginning of the 1957 season, but holding a 1957 season average of less than five, he was out of the team at the end of the year.

Horrex was a lower-middle order batsman for the Essex team by the end of his career, having debuted as an opener.
