= Graham Oates =

Graham Oates may refer to two footballers:

- Graham Oates (footballer, born 1943), who played for Blackpool, Grimsby Town and Wigan Athletic
- Graham Oates (footballer, born 1949), who played for Bradford City, Blackburn Rovers and Newcastle United
