= Graham Fyfe =

Graham Fyfe may refer to:

- Graham Fyfe (footballer, born 1982), ex-Celtic F.C. player who currently plays for Hawke's Bay United
- Graham Fyfe (footballer, born 1951) (1951–2022), ex-Rangers F.C. and Dumbarton player

== See also ==
- Graeme Fife, writer and playwright
