= Graham Borrack =

Australian rules footballer

Personal information
- Full name: Graham Borrack
- Born: 18 May 1937 (age 89)
- Original team: State Savings Bank
- Height: 183 cm (6 ft 0 in)
- Weight: 85 kg (187 lb)

Playing career^{1}
Years	Club	Games (Goals)
1956	Collingwood	1 (0)
- ^{1} Playing statistics correct to the end of 1956.

Graham Borrack (born 18 May 1937) is a former Australian rules footballer who played with Collingwood in the Victorian Football League (VFL).
