= Graham Cawthorne =

English footballer

Personal information
- Full name: Graham John Cawthorne
- Date of birth: 30 September 1958 (age 68)
- Place of birth: Doncaster, England
- Position: Defender

Senior career*
| Years | Team | Apps | (Gls) |
| 1978–1979 | Harworth Colliery Institute | | |
| 1979–1982 | Grimsby Town | 1 | (0) |
| 1982–1983 | Doncaster Rovers | 33 | (1) |
| 1983–198? | Spalding United | | |
- * Club domestic league appearances and goals

Graham John Cawthorne (born 30 September 1958) is an English former professional footballer who played as a defender.
