= Graham Webster =

Graham Webster may refer to:

- Graham Webster (archaeologist) (1913–2001), British archaeologist
- Graham Webster (footballer) (born 1992), Scottish football player
