= Graham Baker =

Graham Baker may refer to:

- Graham Baker (footballer) (born 1958), English former footballer
- Graham Baker (director), British film director
- C. Graham Baker (1883–1950), American screenwriter and director
