= Graham Archell =

English footballer (born 1950)

Personal information
- Full name: Graham Leonard Archell
- Date of birth: 8 February 1950 (age 76)
- Place of birth: Islington, London, England
- Position: Left wing

Youth career
- Leyton Orient

Senior career*
| Years | Team | Apps | (Gls) |
| 1967–1970 | Leyton Orient | 7 | (0) |
| 1970–? | Folkestone Town | | |
- * Club domestic league appearances and goals

Graham Leonard Archell (born 8 February 1950) is an English former professional footballer who played for Leyton Orient in the late 1960s.

Archell was born on 8 February 1950 in Islington, London. He came through the Orient youth system and turned professional in 1967, making his Football League debut against Barrow in November 1967 when he was 17, and kept his place in the team for the following game against Reading. He made nine senior appearances in the League and League Cup for Orient in 1967–1968 and 1968–1969 but did not feature during the 1969–1970 season and moved to Folkestone Town in May 1970.

== Club statistics ==
Source: Kaufman, Neilson N; Ravenhill, Alan E (2002). The Men Who Made Leyton Orient Football Club. Tempus Publishing. p. 19. ISBN 0752424122.

| Club | Season | League | | | FA Cup | | League Cup | |
| Club | Season | Division | Apps | Goals | Apps | Goals | Apps | Goals |
|---|---|---|---|---|---|---|---|---|
| Leyton Orient | 1967–68 | Third Division | 3 | 0 | 0 | 0 | 0 | 0 |
| Leyton Orient | 1968–69 | Third Division | 4 | 0 | 0 | 0 | 2 | 0 |
| Leyton Orient | 1969–70 | Third Division | 0 | 0 | 0 | 0 | 0 | 0 |
| Total | | | 7 | 0 | 0 | 0 | 2 | 0 |
