= Graham Strange =

Bermudian cricketer (born 1968)

Personal information
- Full name: Graham Strange
- Born: 24 July 1968 (age 58); England
- Batting: Right-handed
- Bowling: Right-arm fast

International information
- National side: Bermuda

Career statistics
Competition	First-class
Matches	1
Runs scored	2
Batting average	1.00
100s/50s	–/–
Top score	2
Balls bowled	–
Wickets	–
Bowling average	–
5 wickets in innings	–
10 wickets in match	–
Best bowling	–
Catches/stumpings	–/–
- Source: CricketArchive, 13 October 2011

Graham Strange (born 24 July 1968 in England) is a Bermudian cricketer. He is a right-handed batsman and a right-arm fast bowler. He has played one first-class match for Bermuda to date, against Canada in the 2005 ICC Intercontinental Cup.
