= Graham Phillips =

Graham Phillips may refer to:

- Graham Phillips (journalist) (born 1979), British journalist
- Graham Phillips (writer), British author
- Graham Phillips (presenter), Australian television presenter
- Graham Phillips (actor) (born 1993), American actor

== See also ==
- Graeme Phillips (1948–2025), British theatre director
