= Graham Greene (disambiguation) =

Graham Greene (1904–1991) was a leading English novelist of the 20th century.

Graham Greene may also refer to:

- Graham Greene (actor) (1952–2025), Canadian actor
- Sir William Graham Greene (1857–1950), senior British civil servant
- Graham C. Greene (1936–2016), British publisher
