= Graham Osborne (footballer, born 1947) =

Australian rules footballer

Personal information
- Full name: Graham G. Osborne
- Born: 30 June 1947 (age 79)
- Original team: Toora
- Height: 187 cm (6 ft 2 in)
- Weight: 87 kg (192 lb)
- Position: Utility

Playing career^{1}
Years	Club	Games (Goals)
1966–1977	Melbourne	146 (61)
- ^{1} Playing statistics correct to the end of 1977.

Graham Osborne (born 30 June 1947) is a former Australian rules footballer who played with Melbourne in the Victorian Football League (VFL).

Osborne, a recruit from Toora in the Alberton Football League, was granted a clearance to Melbourne midway through the 1966 VFL season.

He played 146 league games for Melbourne, from 1966 to 1977. His career tally of 18 Brownlow Medal votes all came in 1976.

From 1978 to 1982, Osborne played with Sandringham in the Victorian Football Association (VFA). He won their best and fairest award in 1979, despite missing eight games.
