= Graham Jarvis (disambiguation) =

Graham Jarvis (1930–2003) was a Canadian character actor.

Graham Jarvis may also refer to:

- Graham Jarvis (motorcyclist) (born 1975), British enduro and motorcycle trials rider
- Graham Jarvis (bowls), Canadian international lawn bowler
