= Graham Miller =

Graham Miller may refer to:

- Graham Miller (darts player) (born 1970), retired English darts player
- Graham Miller (Buffy the Vampire Slayer), a character in the TV series Buffy the Vampire Slayer
- J. Graham Miller (1913–2008), pastor and missionary
- Graham Miller (RAF officer) (born 1951), British air marshal
