= Graham Charles Wood =

British corrosion scientist

Graham Charles Wood FRS (6 February 1934—4 November 2016) was an English corrosion scientist.

Born in Farnborough, he went on to study metallurgy at Cambridge. Following postdoctoral work at Cambridge, he moved to Manchester, where his career in corrosion science would be based, starting at the Manchester College of Science and Technology (now the University of Manchester) where he joined the Department of Chemical Engineering as a lecturer in corrosion science. In 1972 he established and led the Corrosion and Protection Centre at UMIST (University of Manchester Institute of Science and Technology) as professor of corrosion science. In 1973 he helped to establish a consulting organisation, Corrosion and Protection Centre Industrial Service (CAPCIS – now part of Intertek).

Graham served terms as President of the Corrosion and Protection Association and the Institution of Corrosion Science and Technology (Institute of Corrosion), and chaired the National Council for Corrosion Societies. He also served as a UK representative on the International Corrosion Council for 15 years, for which he also served as vice-chair and chair.

At UMIST, he held several administerial roles, including vice-principal for academic development, dean, and pro-vice chancellor.

He was elected Fellow of the Royal Academy of Engineering in 1990, and Fellow of the Royal Society in 1997.
