= Graham Mitchell =

Graham Mitchell may refer to:

- Graham Mitchell (English footballer) (born 1968), English footballer
- Graham Mitchell (Scottish footballer) (born 1962), Scottish footballer
- Graham Mitchell (writer), television scriptwriter
- Graham Russell Mitchell (1905–1984), Deputy Director General of the Security Service MI5 1956–1963
