= Graham Hunter (footballer) =

Australian rules footballer (1945–2009)

Personal information
- Full name: Graham Hunter
- Born: 26 October 1945
- Died: 11 December 2009 (aged 64)
- Original team: Geelong West
- Height: 183 cm (6 ft 0 in)
- Weight: 77 kg (170 lb)

Playing career^{1}
| Years | Club | Games (Goals) |
| 1965 | Geelong | 4 (2) |
- ^{1} Playing statistics correct to the end of 1965.

Graham Hunter (26 October 1945 – 11 December 2009) was an Australian rules footballer who played with Geelong in the Victorian Football League (VFL).
