= Graham Kendall =

British scientist (born 1961)

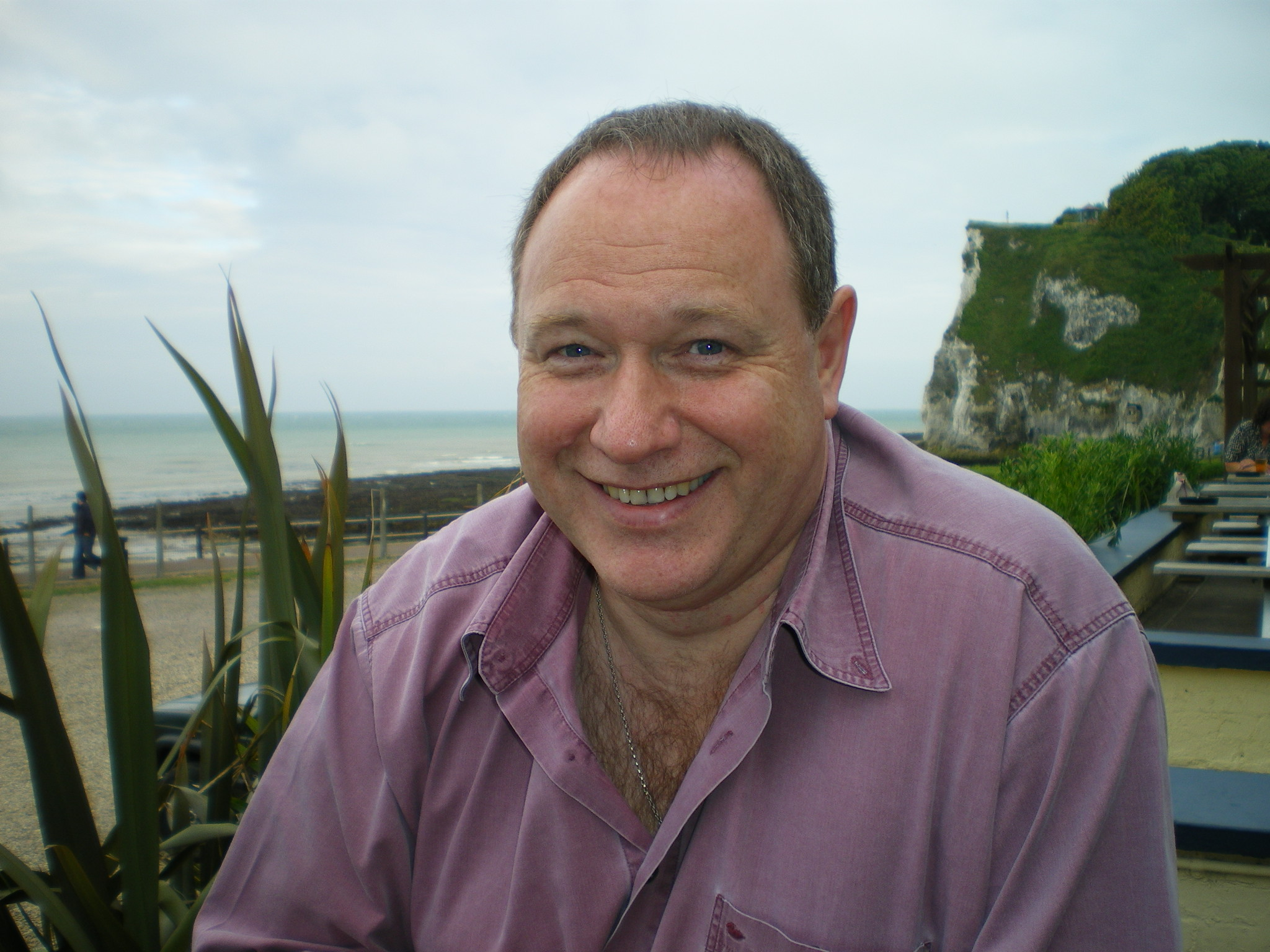
- 18 July 2008, Coastguard Restaurant, Kent, UK
- Born: 21 July 1961 (age 65); London, UK
- Citizenship: UK
- Education: University of Nottingham, UMIST
- Spouse: British
- Children: none
- Scientific career
- Fields: Operations research, optimisation, metaheuristics, hyper-heuristics, scheduling (particularly sports), evolutionary computation
- Doctoral advisor: Edmund K. Burke

Graham Kendall (born 21 July 1961) is a professor of computer science at the University of Nottingham, UK. He is currently (2016–present) the provost and CEO of University of Nottingham Malaysia Campus. He is also a pro-vice chancellor of the university.

He is a member of the Automated Scheduling, Optimisation and Planning (ASAP) Research Group within the School of Computer Science.

He is the editor-in-chief of the IEEE Transactions of Computational Intelligence and AI in Games.
