= Graham Ross =

Graham Ross may refer to:

- Graham Ross (physicist) (1944–2021), British physicist
- Graham Ross (musician) (born 1985), British conductor and composer
- Graham Ross (rugby union) (1928–2009), Scotland rugby union player
- Graham Ross (horticulturalist), (born 1947), Australian horticulturist
