= Graham Cooper =

Graham Cooper may refer to:

- Graham Cooper (footballer, born 1962), English football midfielder for Huddersfield Town
- Graham Cooper (Australian rules footballer) (1938–2019), Australian rules footballer for Hawthorn
- Graham Cooper (cricketer) (1936–2012), English cricketer
- Graham Cooper (rower) (1941–2024), British Olympic rower
- Graham Cooper (rugby union) (born 1989), Australian rugby union referee
