= Graham Bailey =

Graham Bailey may refer to:

- Graham Bailey (footballer) (1920–2024), English footballer
- Graham Bailey (rugby union) (born 1936), Australian rugby union footballer

== See also ==
- Graeme Bailey (born 1943), Australian racing driver
