= Graham Caulfield =

English footballer (born 1943)

Personal information
- Full name: Graham William Caulfield
- Date of birth: 18 July 1943 (age 83)
- Place of birth: Leeds, England
- Position: Centre forward

Youth career
- Frickley Colliery

Senior career*
Years	Team	Apps	(Gls)
1966–1967	York City	9	(2)
1967–1968	Bradford City	1	(0)
- Ossett Albion
Total		10	(2)
- * Club domestic league appearances and goals

Graham William Caulfield (born 18 July 1943) is an English former footballer who played as a centre forward.

== Career ==
Born in Leeds, Caulfield played for Frickley Colliery, York City, Bradford City and Ossett Albion.

He played for Bradford City between July 1967 and 1968, making one appearance in the Football League.

== Sources ==
- Frost, Terry (1988). Bradford City A Complete Record 1903-1988. Breedon Books Sport. ISBN 0-907969-38-0.
