= Graham Whaling =

American businessman

- Education: University of Texas; University of Pennsylvania
- Occupation: businessman
- Known for: Ryder Scott Company (petroleum engineer); Santa Fe Energy (CFO); Monterey Resources (CEO); Parkman Whaling LLC (co-founder & managing director)

Graham Whaling is a businessman and conservative donor.

== Life and career ==
Whaling earned his bachelor's degree from the University of Texas in 1976. Whaling played for the tennis team under coach Dave Snyder, and served as captain in his senior year. Whaling also holds an MBA from the University of Pennsylvania.

Whaling' career began as a petroleum engineer, working for Ryder Scott Company, an oil and gas consulting firm. Whaling worked as an investment banker focusing on the energy industry with Lazard Freres & Co. and CS First Boston. Whaling has served as the CFO of Santa Fe Energy, and the CEO Monterey Resources, which was eventually sold to Texaco. Whaling co-founded Parkman Whaling LLC, and continues to serve as its managing director.

== Political activities ==
In 2012, Whaling donated $100,000 to Club for Growth Action, a conservative Super PAC. Whaling also donated $100,000 to Restore Our Future, Mitt Romney's Super PAC.
