= Graham Rose =

Graham Rose may refer to:

- Graham Rose (cricketer) (born 1964), former English cricketer for Somerset
- Graham Rose (bishop) (born 1951), current bishop of the Catholic diocese of Dundee, South Africa
