= Graham Duncan =

Graham Duncan can refer to:

- Graham Duncan (botanist) (born 1959), South African botanist
- Graham Duncan (cricketer) (born 1947), New Zealand cricketer
- Graham Duncan (footballer) (born 1969), Scottish footballer
