= Graham Stokes =

Graham Stokes may refer to:

- Graham Stokes (music executive) (born 1958), British music executive and musician
- Graham Stokes (cricketer) (1858–1921), English cricketer
- James Graham Phelps Stokes (1872–1960), known as Graham, American millionaire socialist writer, political activist, and philanthropist
