= Graham Harvey =

Graham Harvey may refer to:

- Graham Harvey (actor), Australian actor
- Graham Harvey (footballer) (born 1961), Scottish former footballer
- Graham Harvey (religious studies scholar) (born 1959), English scholar
- Graham Harvey (sport shooter) (born 1944), British sports shooter
- Graham Harvey (football manager) (born 1984), English football manager
