= Graham Stack =

Graham Stack may refer to:

- Graham Stack (footballer) (born 1981), football goalkeeper
- Graham Stack (record producer), English born record producer and songwriter
- Graham Stack (surgeon) (1915–1992), orthopedic surgeon
