= Graham Stanford =

Australian cricketer (born 1948)

Personal information
- Born: 25 April 1948 (age 78); Adelaide, Australia
- Source: Cricinfo, 25 September 2020

Graham Stanford (born 25 April 1948) is an Australian cricketer. He played in one first-class match for South Australia in 1968/69.

== See also ==
- List of South Australian representative cricketers
