= Graham Brandt =

Australian rules footballer (1947–2011)

Personal information
- Full name: Graham William Brandt
- Born: 1 March 1947
- Died: 10 October 2011 (aged 64)
- Original team: South Bendigo
- Height: 182 cm (6 ft 0 in)
- Weight: 85 kg (187 lb)

Playing career^{1}
Years	Club	Games (Goals)
1969, 1971	South Melbourne	13 (2)
- ^{1} Playing statistics correct to the end of 1971.

Graham William Brandt (1 March 1947 – 10 October 2011) was an Australian rules footballer who played with South Melbourne in the Victorian Football League (VFL).
