= Graham Thompson (footballer) =

Australian rules footballer

Personal information
- Full name: Graham Thompson
- Born: 30 August 1936
- Height: 165 cm (5 ft 5 in)
- Weight: 69 kg (152 lb)

Playing career^{1}
Years	Club	Games (Goals)
1956	Footscray	1 (0)
- ^{1} Playing statistics correct to the end of 1956.

Graham Thompson (born 30 August 1936) is a former Australian rules footballer who played with Footscray in the Victorian Football League (VFL).
