= Graham Jackson =

Graham Jackson may refer to:

- Graham Jackson (British conductor) (1967–2012), British conductor
- Graham W. Jackson Sr. (1903–1983), American theatre organist, pianist and choral conductor
- Graham Jackson (businessman), Australian businessman
- Jack Jackson (businessman) (W. Graham Jackson), co-founder of Pep Boys
