= Graham Faux =

Australian rugby league footballer

Personal information
- Full name: Graham Faux
- Born: 12 March 1956 (age 69)

Playing information
- Position: Prop, Second-row
Club
Years	Team	Pld	T	G	FG	P
1977	Newtown	5	0	0	0	0
1979–80	Canterbury Bulldogs	8	1	0	0	3
1982	Illawarra Steelers	14	1	0	0	3
	Total	27	2	0	0	6
- Source: As of 6 February 2023

Graham Faux is an Australian former professional rugby league footballer who played in the 1970s and 1980s. He played for Illawarra, Canterbury-Bankstown and Newtown in the New South Wales Rugby League (NSWRL) competition.

== Playing career ==
After playing lower grades for Canterbury, Faux made his first-grade debut for Newtown in round 6 of the 1977 NSWRFL season against Cronulla at the Sydney Cricket Ground. Faux played a total of five games for Newtown in his only season there as they finished with the Wooden Spoon.

In 1979, Faux returned to Canterbury and played two seasons in first grade for the club. In 1982, he joined the newly admitted Illawarra side and played 14 games for them in their inaugural season.
