= Graham Simpson (doctor) =

Graham Simpson is a medical doctor and advocate of “natural” and proactive medicine and health. He graduated from the University of the Witwatersrand Medical School in Johannesburg, South Africa, and is board certified in internal medicine and emergency medicine. He was also a founding member of the American Holistic Medical Association (AHMA).

Simpson was the founder and medical director of Eternity Medicine Institute (EMI) in Dubai, reportedly the only clinic in the UAE to offer Bioidentical Hormone Replacement Therapy (BHRT), and the first clinic in the Gulf region to open a compounding pharmacy. Dr. Simpson has since moved his practice, Eternity Medicine, to Las Vegas, Nevada where he focuses on reversing diabesity. A BHRT expert and an advocate of natural progesterone, he questions the use of synthetic or artificial hormones as replacement therapy.

Promoting a holistic approach to living and to maintaining good health, Simpson suggests that “inner peace” can have healing properties and blames grudges and hostility for the “release of histamines, which can trigger severe broncho-constriction in people with asthma, and can also cause chemical changes in the body that increase the risk of heart disease.”

Simpson also cites the "Western diet" and its high glycemic index as the cause of silent inflammation as the cause of "life-altering illness" and advocates following a Paleo diet or Keto diet to manage and prevent "health problems of epidemic proportion". His latest book, 4 Week Diabesity Cure: Cure Diabetes and Lose Weight in Weeks With a Keto Diet and Intermittent Fasting details how the Western diet is responsible for the greatest health crisis currently affecting the world and offers steps on how to overcome this dilemma.

Dr. Simpson has co-authored a book on Spa Medicine: Your Guide to the Ageless Zone in which he discusses the Four Pillars of Wellness: detoxification, nutrition, exercise and mind-body health as well as authored WellMan: Live Longer by Controlling Inflammation, emphasizes the key to successful aging is the control of hidden or silent inflammation that occurs primarily from lifestyle and diet choices.
