= Graham Pritchard =

English cricketer (1942–2019)

Graham Charles Pritchard (14 January 1942 – 26 October 2019) was an English cricketer who played first-class cricket for Cambridge University and Essex from 1962 to 1966.

Pritchard was educated at The King's School, Canterbury, and Gonville and Caius College, Cambridge. He appeared in 35 first-class matches as a right-arm fast-medium bowler and right-handed tail-end batsman. He scored 111 runs at an average of 4.11 with a highest score of 18 and took 56 wickets at an average of 36.75. His best bowling figures were 6 for 51 for Cambridge against Surrey in 1963, when on a damp pitch he moved the ball through the air and off the pitch; at one stage he had three wickets and Surrey were 5 for 4.
