= Graham Oddie =

New Zealand philosopher

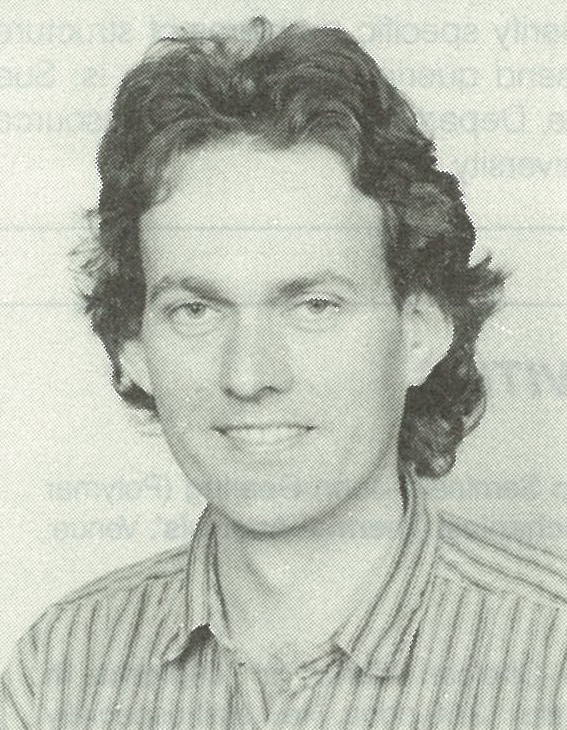
Oddie, c. 1988

Graham Oddie is a New Zealand philosopher who lives and works in the United States. He has been Professor of Philosophy at the University of Colorado since 1994.

== Biography ==
Oddie was educated at the University of Otago, where he received a first class honors degree in philosophy, and at the London School of Economics, where he received a PhD in logic and philosophy of science (1979). His teachers at the University of Otago included Pavel Tichý and Alan Musgrave, and at the LSE, John Watkins (his supervisor), and Colin Howson. Before moving to the United States he held positions at the University of Otago Oddie wrote a PhD on his new idea of truthlikeness which transformed into his book, Likeness to Truth. and Massey University (where he was Professor and Chair of Philosophy from 1988 to 1994). At the University of Colorado he was elected Chair of Philosophy in 1997, and appointed Associate Dean for Humanities and the Arts in 2002. He is a past President of the Australasian Association of Philosophy, and has held visiting positions at the University of Helsinki, Tantur Institute Jerusalem, the University of London, the Australian National University, the University of Sydney, the University of Canterbury, and Oxford University. In the Spring of 2019, Oddie was a Residential Fellow at the Swedish Collegium for Advanced Study in Uppsala, Sweden.

Oddie is best known for his work in the theory of value—including the nature of value, the logic of value and our knowledge of value. He is also known for work on cognitive values (truth, truthlikeness and probability). His books include Likeness to Truth (the first monograph on the notion of verisimilitude, or closeness to the truth), and Value, Reality, and Desire (an extended defense of the thesis that value is real and irreducible).

== Publications ==
=== Books ===
- Likeness to Truth, (Reidel, 1986), ISBN 978-94-009-4658-3.
- Justice, Ethics and New Zealand Society, co-edited with Roy Perrett, (Oxford University Press, 1992), ISBN 978-0195582413.
- What's Wrong? Applied Ethicists and Their Critics, co-edited with David Boonin, (Oxford University Press, 2004 and 2009), ISBN 978-0195337808.
- Value, Reality and Desire (Oxford University Press, 2005 and 2009), ISBN 978-0199562381.

=== Selected papers ===
- “Thinking Globally, Acting Locally: Partiality, Preferences and Perspective”, Les Ateliers De L’Éthique (La Revue de Créum) Volume 9, numéro 2, été 2014, pp. 57–81.
- "The content, consequence and likeness approaches to verisimilitude: compatibility, trivialization, and underdetermination", Synthese June 2013, Volume 190, Issue 9, pp 1647–1687.
- "Truthlikeness", The Stanford Encyclopedia of Philosophy (Summer 2014 Edition), Edward N. Zalta (ed.)
- “The fictionalist’s attitude problem”, (with Dan Demetriou) in Ethical Theory and Moral Practice, (2007), 10: 485-98.
