= Graham Ward =

Graham Ward may refer to:

- Graham Ward (footballer) (born 1985), assistant manager of Wolverhampton Sporting
- Graham Ward (theologian) (born 1955), Regius Professor of Divinity at Oxford
- Graham Ward (musician), drummer, sound engineer and sound designer
