= Graham Buckley =

Scottish footballer (born 1963)

Personal information
- Date of birth: 31 October 1963 (age 62)
- Place of birth: Edinburgh, Scotland
- Position: Forward

Senior career*
Years	Team	Apps	(Gls)
- Edina Hibs
- Melbourne Thistle
	Dunfermline Athletic	0	(0)
- Haddington Athletic
–1986	Prestonfield Links United		
1986–1988	Berwick Rangers	8	(3)
1987–1990	Brechin City	63	(18)
1990–1993	Cowdenbeath	99	(34)
1992–1994	Arbroath	39	(6)
1994–1995	Newtongrange Star		
1995–1996	Cowdenbeath	15	(3)
- Civil Service Strollers

Managerial career
- 2016–2017: Craigroyston
- * Club domestic league appearances and goals

Graham Buckley (born 1 October 1963) is a Scottish retired footballer who played in the Scottish League for Cowdenbeath, Brechin City, Arbroath and Berwick Rangers as a forward.

== Personal life ==
Buckley has worked as a postman.

== Honours ==
Cowdenbeath

- Scottish League Second Division second-place promotion: 1991–92

Individual

- Cowdenbeath Hall of Fame
