= Graham Stanley =

English footballer

Personal information
- Full name: Graham Stanley
- Date of birth: 27 January 1938
- Place of birth: Rotherham, England
- Date of death: 14 January 1997 (aged 58)
- Place of death: Bolton, England
- Position: Wing half

Senior career*
Years	Team	Apps	(Gls)
1956–1964	Bolton Wanderers	141	(3)
1965–1966	Tranmere Rovers	1	(1)
1966–	Runcorn		
- * Club domestic league appearances and goals

Graham Stanley (27 January 1938 – 14 January 1997) was a footballer who played as a wing half in the Football League for Bolton Wanderers, Tranmere Rovers and Runcorn.
