= Graham Morgan =

Graham Morgan may refer to:

- Graham Morgan (nurse) (born 1947), British nurse and nursing administrator
- Graham Morgan (drummer) (1937–2026), Australian drummer and teacher of drumming
