= Graham Fraser (disambiguation) =

Graham Fraser is a Canadian writer, journalist and Commissioner of Official Language.

Graham Fraser may also refer to:

- Graham Fraser (industrialist) (1846–1915), Canadian steel mogul
- Graham Fraser (otolaryngologist) (1936–1994), English ear, nose, and throat surgeon
