= Charles Roy MacKinnon =

British writer

Charles Roy Stuart-Vernon Laird MacKinnon of Dunakin
- Born: Charles Roy Stuart-Vernon; 1924; Scotland, UK
- Died: 2005 (aged 80–81); Scotland, UK
- Occupations: Writer, novelist
- Writing career
- Period: 1958–1984
- Genres: Non-fiction, romance, suspense fiction

Charles Roy Stuart-Vernon, Laird MacKinnon of Dunakin (1924 in Scotland – 2005 in Scotland), was a prolific British writer. He wrote historical books and novels of diverse genres under various pseudonyms: Charles Stuart, Charles MacKinnon, Charles MacKinnon of Dunakin, C. R. MacKinnon of Dunakin, C. R. MacKinnon, Graham Montrose, Iain Torr, I. Torr, Vivian Stuart, Vivian Donald and Barbara Lynn.

== Biography ==
Charles Roy Stuart-Vernon, F.R.S.A., F.S.A.(Scot.), born in 1924 in Scotland, was hereditary chieftain and laird of Dunakin and of Dunakin Castle, Isle of Skye; and hereditary seanchaidh of the Clan MacKinnon. He served as Flight Lieutenant in the R.A.F.

== Bibliography ==
=== As Charles MacKinnon of Dunakin ===
==== Non-fiction books ====
- The Clan MacKinnon: A short history (1958)
- Tartans and Highland Dress (1960)
- The Highlands in History (1961)
- Scotland's Heraldry (1962)
- The Observer's Book of Heraldry (1966)
- The Scottish Highlanders: A Personal View (1984)

=== As Vivian Donald ===
==== Single novels ====
- Better a Neighbour (1962)
- A Far Cry (1963)
- Love Comes to Lochieburn (1966)
- Highland Reel (1967)
- Island Paradise (1968)
- Love On Location (1968)
- The Roots of Love (1970)
- The Laird and the Lady (1972)
- The Happy Isle (1972)
- The Lady Ambassador (1972)
- Royal Scot (1972)
- A Royal Affair (1972)
- The Crock of Gold (1973)
- For Love or Money (1973)
- Cathy's Choice (1978)
- Love Royal (1978)
- Julie's Girl (1978)
- Elizabeth in Love (1979)

=== As Iain Torr ===
==== Single novels ====
- Westering Home (1963)
- The Hills of Home (1964)
- A Time for Change (1965)
- No Room for Love (1966)
- When I Give (1966)
- Sundown (1968)
- The Long Road Home (1969)
- Haven of Peace (1970)
- Janie (1974)

=== As Charles Stuart ===
==== Single novels ====
- Highland Fling (1964)
- Cupids and Coronets (1974)
- The Happy Hostage (1975)
- The Sun in Her Heart (1975)
- Palmer's Court (1975)
- Blood's Bride (1975)

=== As Graham Montrose ===
==== Band of Angels Series ====
1. Angel of No Mercy (1968)
2. Angel of Death (1968)
3. Where Angel Treads (1969)
4. Angel Abroad (1969)
5. Angel of Vengeance (1970)
6. Angel in Paradise (1970)
7. Send for Angel (1970)
8. Ask an Angel (1970)
9. Angel and the Nero (1971)
10. Fanfare for Angel (1971)
11. Angel at Arms (1971)
12. Angel and the Red Admiral (1972)

==== Single novels ====
- A Matter of Motive (1969)

=== As I. Torr ===
==== Single novels ====
- Love Finds the Way (1972)

=== Charles MacKinnon ===
==== Castlemore Series ====
1. Castlemore (1973)
2. A House at War (1973)
3. The Years Beyond (1974)

==== Single novels ====
- Mereford Tapestry (1974)
- The Matriarch (1975)
- Farthingale's Folly (1977)

=== As Vivian Stuart ===
==== Single novels ====
- Darnley's Bride (1976)
- The New Mrs. Aldrich (1976)
- The Darkness of Love (1977)

=== As Barbara Lynn ===
==== Single novels ====
- Tender Longings (1978)
