= Graham C. Newbury =

American physician (1910–1986)

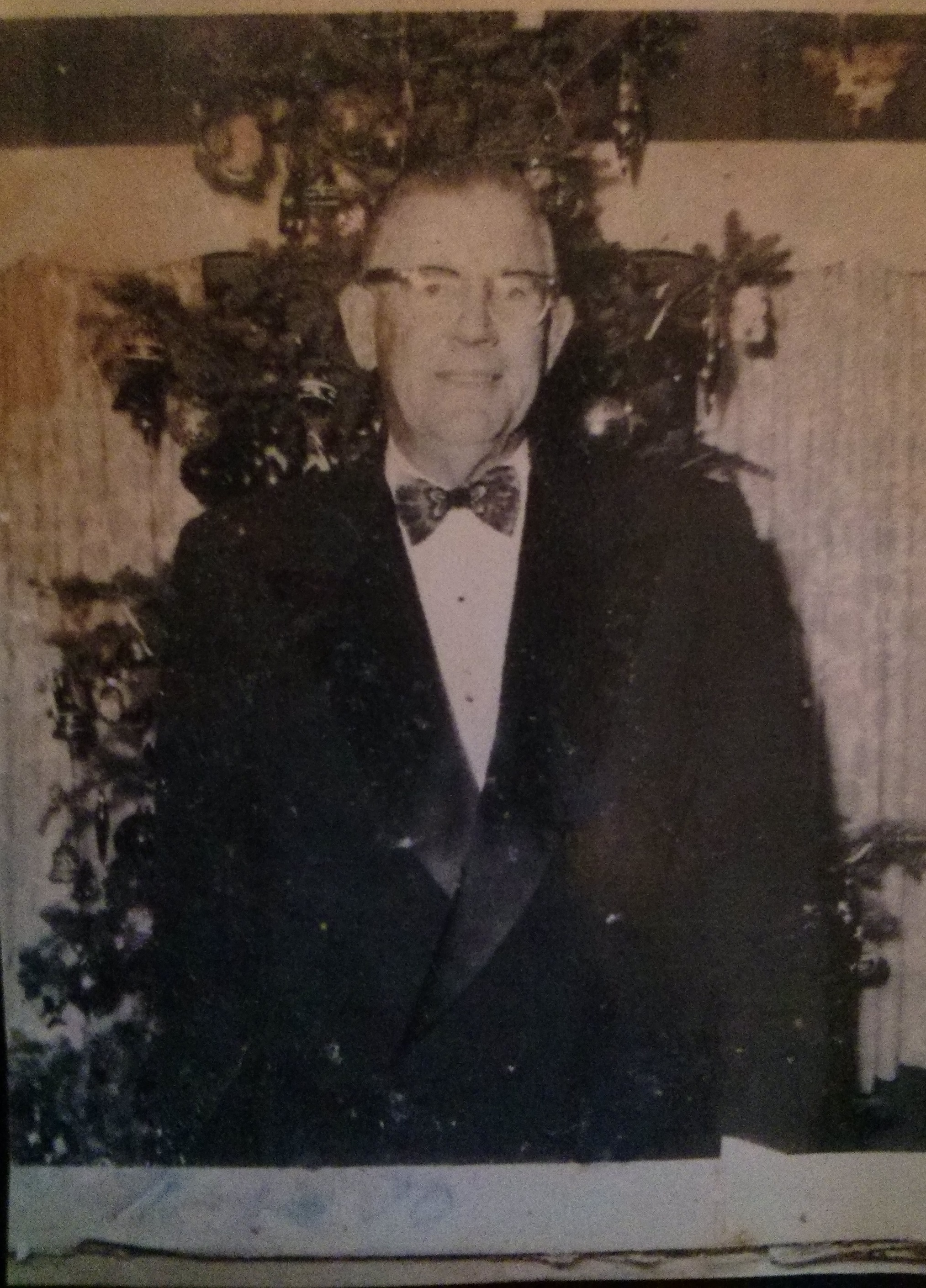
- Born: November 7, 1910; Newark, New Jersey, U.S.
- Died: December 22, 1985 (aged 75); Point Pleasant, New Jersey, U.S.
- Education: Trinity College; Yale University
- Occupation: Surgeon
- Employer: Overlook Hospital
- Spouse: Jane Cunningham
- Children: 2

Graham C. Newbury (November 7, 1910 – December 22, 1985) was a general surgeon from New Jersey. He was chief surgeon at Overlook Hospital in Summit, New Jersey.

== Early life ==
Graham C. Newbury was born on November 7, 1910, in Newark, New Jersey. He graduated from Point Pleasant Borough High School in 1927. He graduated from Trinity College in 1931 and graduated from Yale School of Medicine in 1935. He did a medical internship at Princeton Hospital and his surgical residency at Union Memorial Hospital in Baltimore.

== Career ==
Newbury had a surgical practice in Summit and Cranford from 1939 to 1959. He was a member of the surgical staff and served as chief of staff at Overlook Hospital in Summit. In 1959, he began practicing medicine in Lavallette. He also served as a member of the Lavallette Board of Health and was school physician for Lavallette Elementary School. He became a member of the surgical staff at Point Pleasant Hospital. He retired in 1978. Following retirement, he had a private practice with his wife, who worked as a nurse.

Newbury became a diplomat of the National Board of Medical Examiners in 1936 and was a fellow of the International College of Surgeons in 1947. He became a fellow of the American College of Surgeons in 1951. He was a member of the Union County Medical Society and served as its president from 1958 to 1959. He was a member of the American Medical Association and the Medical Society of New Jersey. He was also a member of the Ocean County Medical Society. He was a medical advisor for the Lavallette Fire Department and First Aid Squad.

== Personal life ==
Newbury married Jane Cunningham. They had two daughters, Jane and Kathryn. He lived in Summit. He lived in Lavallette for 25 years and then moved to Brick Township in April 1985.

Newbury died on December 22, 1985, aged 76, at Point Pleasant Hospital.

== Legacy ==
Newbury Academy alternative high school in Dumont, New Jersey was named in honor of the Newburys.
