= Graham Douglas =

Graham Douglas can refer to:

- Graham Douglas (cricketer) (born 1945), New Zealand cricketer
- Graham Douglas (sculptor) (1879–1954), American sculptor
