= Graham Evans (disambiguation) =

Graham Evans, Baron Evans of Rainow (born 1963) is a British Conservative politician.

Graham Evans may also refer to:

- Graham Evans (field hockey) (born 1945), British field hockey player
- Graham Evans (public servant) (born 1943), Australian public servant and policymaker

== See also ==
- Graeme Evans (born 1942), Zimbabwean cricket umpire
