= Graham Hughes (disambiguation) =

Graham Hughes (born 1979) is a British adventurer and filmmaker.

Graham Hughes may also refer to:

- Graham Hughes (cyclist) (1916–2013), New Zealand racing cyclist
- Graham Hughes (director), Scottish film director
- Graham Hughes (rheumatologist), discovered antiphospholipid syndrome

== See also ==
- Graeme Hughes (born 1955), Australian cricketer, rugby league player
