= Graham Bamford =

Australian rules footballer

Personal information
- Full name: Graham Bamford
- Born: 1 June 1944
- Original team: Hamilton
- Height: 173 cm (5 ft 8 in)
- Weight: 70 kg (154 lb)

Playing career^{1}
Years	Club	Games (Goals)
1964	Richmond	1 (1)
- ^{1} Playing statistics correct to the end of 1964.

Graham Bamford (born 1 June 1944) is a former Australian rules footballer who played with Richmond in the Victorian Football League (VFL).
