= Graham Williams =

Graham Williams may refer to:

== Sportspeople ==
- Graham Williams (Australian cricketer) (1911–1978), Australian cricketer and prisoner of war
- Graham Williams (footballer, born 1936) (1936–2018), Welsh international footballer who played for nine teams in England and Wales
- Graham Williams (footballer, born 1938), Welsh international footballer who played for West Bromwich Albion and managed Weymouth and Cardiff City
- Graham Williams (rugby league) (1944–1994), English rugby league footballer who played in the 1960s and 1970s, and coached in the 1980s
- Graham Williams (rugby union) (1945–2018), New Zealand rugby union footballer
- Graham Williams (English cricketer) (born 1985), English cricketer

== Others ==
- Graham Williams (television producer) (1945–1990), British television producer and script editor
- Graham Williams (promoter) (born 1978), concert promoter based in Austin, Texas, USA
- Graham Headley Williams, guitarist with Welsh band Racing Cars
