= Graham Winstanley =

English footballer

Personal information
- Full name: Graham Winstanley
- Date of birth: 20 January 1948 (age 78)
- Place of birth: Croxdale, England
- Position: Central defender

Youth career
- Newcastle United

Senior career*
Years	Team	Apps	(Gls)
1966–1969	Newcastle United	7	(0)
1969–1974	Carlisle United	166	(8)
1974–1979	Brighton & Hove Albion	64	(4)
1979–1980	Carlisle United	33	(1)
1982–1983	Penrith		
- * Club domestic league appearances and goals

Graham Winstanley (born 20 January 1948) is an English former professional footballer who made 270 Football League appearances playing as a central defender for Newcastle United, Carlisle United and Brighton & Hove Albion.

== Life and career ==
Winstanley was born in 1948 in Croxdale, County Durham. He began his football career with Newcastle United of the First Division, but was unable to force his way into the first team, and dropped down a division ahead of the 1969–70 season to join Carlisle United for an £8,000 fee. He remained with Carlisle for five years, and was a member of the team that gained promotion to the First Division in 1974. He played little at the higher level, and moved on to third-tier club Brighton & Hove Albion in October 1974 on loan, made permanent a month later for a fee of £20,000. He helped the team avoid relegation in 1975, and was named club captain for the coming season. He then broke his nose and found it difficult to regain his first-team place as the team gained two promotions in three seasons. He made 64 league appearances over four-and-a-half years before returning to Carlisle United, by then back in the Third Division, for one more season. After two years on the club's coaching staff, he joined Penrith, first as player and then as manager. He remained living and working in Carlisle.
