= Graham Schodde =

Australian rules footballer

Personal information
- Full name: Graham Schodde
- Born: 19 June 1958 (age 68)
- Original team: North Albury
- Height: 182 cm (6 ft 0 in)
- Weight: 79 kg (174 lb)
- Position: Wing

Playing career^{1}
Years	Club	Games (Goals)
1980	St Kilda	5 (2)
- ^{1} Playing statistics correct to the end of 1980.

Graham Schodde (born 19 June 1958) is a former Australian rules footballer who played with St Kilda in the Victorian Football League (VFL). Graham Paul Schodde was born in Sydney and played for North Albury before being recruited by VFL club North Melbourne. He played for North Melbourne's under-19 side in 1976, and in North's reserves in 1977 and 1978 without playing a senior game. He crossed to St Kilda at the beginning of 1979 and played in the reserves throughout that season. He played five senior games for St Kilda in 1980 and then played two games in the reserves early in 1981. He later moved to USA where he became a successful sculptor. Details confirmed with AFL. Not to be confused with Graham Desmond Schodde.
