= Graham Hurst (cricketer) =

English cricketer

Personal information
- Full name: Graham Hurst
- Born: 22 September 1960 (age 66); Newcastle-upon-Tyne, Northumberland, England, United Kingdom
- Batting: Right-handed

Domestic team information
- Years: Team
- 1979–1987: Durham

Career statistics
Competition	List A
Matches	4
Runs scored	14
Batting average	4.66
100s/50s	–/–
Top score	7
Balls bowled	–
Wickets	–
Bowling average	–
5 wickets in innings	–
10 wickets in match	–
Best bowling	–
Catches/stumpings	1/–
- Source: Cricinfo, 7 August 2011

Graham Hurst (born 22 September 1960) is a former English cricketer. Hurst was a right-handed batsman. He was born in Newcastle-upon-Tyne, Northumberland.

Hurst made his debut for Durham against the Lancashire in the 1979 Minor Counties Championship. He played Minor counties cricket for Durham from 1979 to 1987, making 53 Minor Counties Championship appearances and 7 MCCA Knockout Trophy appearances. He made his List A debut against Surrey in the 1982 NatWest Trophy. He made 3 further List A appearances, the last of which came against Warwickshire in the 1986 NatWest Trophy. He struggled against first-class opponents in his 4 List A matches, scoring just 14 runs at an average of 4.66, with a high score of 7.
