= Graham Barnett (priest) =

Anglican dean (1885–1978)

Graham Roy Barnett (7 September 1885 – 26 October 1978) was a New Zealand Anglican priest who was Dean of Waikato from 1927 until 1932.

Barnett was born in 1885 in Tuamarina, New Zealand. educated at Marlborough Boys' College and the University of New Zealand; and ordained in 1912. After Curacies in Ross, Hokitika and St Mary's Church, Portsea he held incumbencies at Tolaga Bay, Te Kūiti, Waihi and Frankton before his time as Dean; and Brighton, Ifield and Thakeham afterwards. He served as Temporary Chaplain to the Forces (TCF) in WWI.

He died in Sussex, aged 93.
