= Graham Kingston =

Welsh cricketer

Personal information
- Full name: Graham Charles Kingston
- Born: 1 November 1950 (age 76); Newport, Monmouthshire, Wales
- Batting: Right-handed
- Bowling: Right-arm medium

Domestic team information
- Years: Team
- 1967–1971: Glamorgan

Career statistics
Competition	FC	LA
Matches	9	13
Runs scored	161	19
Batting average	12.38	3.16
100s/50s	–/–	–/–
Top score	26	9
Balls bowled	360	383
Wickets	4	19
Bowling average	52.50	14.57
5 wickets in innings	–	1
10 wickets in match	–	–
Best bowling	2/18	6/36
Catches/stumpings	4/–	5/–
- Source: Cricinfo, 3 July 2010

Graham Charles Kingston (1 November 1950) is a former Welsh cricketer. Kingston was a right-handed batsman who bowled right-arm medium pace. He was born at Newport, Monmouthshire.

Kingston made his first-class debut for Glamorgan aged 16, in the 1967 County Championship against Worcestershire. From 1967 to 1971, he represented the county in 9 first-class matches, with his final first-class appearance for the county coming against Oxford University. In his 9 first-class matches he scored 161 runs at a batting average of 12.38, with a high score of 26. With the ball, he took just 4 wickets at a bowling average of 52.50, with best figures of 2/18.

Kingston also played List-A cricket for Glamorgan, making his List-A debut for the county in the 1968 Gillette Cup against Northamptonshire. From 1968 to 1970, he represented the county in 13 List-A matches, with his final List-A appearance coming in 1970 against Hampshire. In his 13 List-A matches, he took 19 wickets at an average of 14.57, with a single five wicket haul which yielded him best figures of 6/36 against Derbyshire in the 1969 John Player League. Kingston left the Glamorgan staff at the end of the 1971 season.

After leaving Glamorgan he worked as a real estate agent in Newport.
