= Graham Usher (dancer) =

Ballet dancer

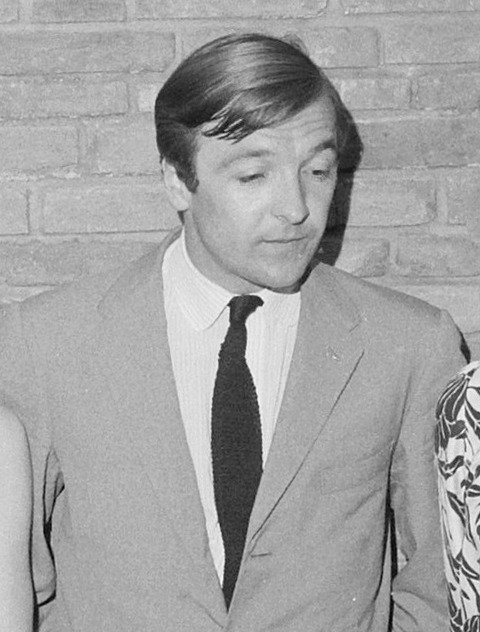
Graham Usher in 1964

Graham Usher (1938–1975) was a ballet dancer with the Royal Ballet.

Usher appeared as a castaway on the BBC Radio programme Desert Island Discs on 16 May 1970.

He was forced to retire early in 1970 due to fainting fits. He died suddenly at the age of 36 in February 1975.

Jeffery Taylor subsequently described him as:

"one of the sweetest, most gentle natured beings I have ever met [with] extravagantly arched feet, high arabesque and fluidly graceful arm movements."
