= Graham Scambler =

British sociologist

Graham Scambler (born 1948) is a sociologist, specializing in medical sociology.

== Life and work ==
Scambler completed a B.Sc. in Philosophy and Sociology at the University of Surrey in 1971, followed by a Ph.D. in sociology (supervised by George Brown at Bedford College, University of London. His PhD thesis was on the stigma experienced by adults with epilepsy living in the community.

He was appointed Lecturer in Sociology at Charing Cross Hospital Medical School in 1972–5. He then moved to the Middlesex Hospital Medical School from 1978 to 1987 which became part of University College London (UCL). He was appointed Professor of Medical Sociology at UCL in 2001. He retired from UCL in 2013.

He is author or editor of several books and has written over 100 chapters and peer-reviewed papers. He is founding co-editor of the international journal Social Theory and Health.

== Awards ==
- Fellow of the Academy of Social Sciences

== Publications ==
- Patrick, D & Scambler, G (Eds) (1982). Sociology as applied to medicine. London: Bailliere Tindall/W.B.Saunders (6 editions)
- Fitzpatrick, R., Hinton, J., Newman, S., Scambler, G. & Thompson, J. (1984). The experience of illness. London: Tavistock.
- Scambler, G. (Ed)(1987). Sociological theory and medical sociology. London: Tavistock
- Scambler, G. (1989). Epilepsy. London: Tavistock
- Scambler, A. & Scambler, G. (1993). Menstrual disorders. London: Routledge.
- Scambler, G. & Scambler, A. (Eds.)(1997). Rethinking prostitution. London: Routledge
- Scambler, G. & Higgs, P. (Eds)(1998). Modernity, medicine and health. London: Routledge
- Scambler, G. (Ed)(2001). Habermas, critical theory and health. London: Routledge
- Scambler, G. (2002). Health and social change. Buckingham: Open University Press
- Scambler, G. (Ed)(2005). Medical sociology. London: Routledge.
- Scambler, G. & Scambler, S. (Eds.)(2010). New directions in the sociology of chronic and disabling conditions. London: Palgrave.
- Scambler, G. (Ed.)(2012). Contemporary theorists and medical sociology. London: Routledge.
- Aksei Tjora & Scambler, G. (eds.) Café Society w York : Palgrave Macmillan, [2013]
