= Graham Galbraith =

British Academic

professor Graham Galbraith CBE

Vice-Chancellor of the University of Portsmouth
- Incumbent
- Assumed office September 2013
- Chancellor: Sandi Toksvig; Karen Blackett
- Preceded by: John Craven

Deputy Vice-Chancellor of the University of Hertfordshire
- In office 2008–2013

Pro Vice-Chancellor (International) of Glasgow Caledonian University
- In office 1993–2008

Personal details
- Born: 16 October 1960 (age 65)
- Education: University of Strathclyde

Graham Harold Galbraith CBE (born 16 October 1960) is a British academic and administrator who has served as Vice-Chancellor of the University of Portsmouth since September 2013. He previously served as Deputy Vice-Chancellor of the University of Hertfordshire and Pro Vice-Chancellor (International) of the Glasgow Caledonian University.

Galbraith holds Chartered Engineer status, Fellowship of the Higher Education Academy, Membership of the Chartered Institution for Building Service Engineers and is a Member of the Institute of Directors. In the 2022 New Year Honours List, Galbraith was awarded a CBE for services to Higher education.

== Education ==
Galbraith attended the University of Strathclyde, where he gained a Bachelor of Science in Environmental Energy, followed by a Master of Science and PhD in Mechanical Engineering.
