= Graham Bassett =

English footballer

Personal information
- Full name: Graham Raymond Bassett
- Date of birth: 6 October 1964 (age 62)
- Place of birth: Sunderland, England
- Position: Striker

Youth career
- Sunderland

Senior career*
Years	Team	Apps	(Gls)
1983–1984	Hartlepool United	7	(0)
1984	Berwick Rangers	6	(3)
- * Club domestic league appearances and goals

Graham Raymond Bassett (born 6 October 1964) is an English former professional footballer who played as a striker. He was born in Sunderland, Tyne and Wear.

== Career ==
Bassett started his career in the youth team at his hometown club Sunderland. In 1982 Graham spent the 2nd year of his YTS at Ipswich Town scoring 13 goals in 11 youth team games before being released at the end of the season(Source www.prideofanglia.co.uk). He left in 1983 to join Football League Fourth Division side Hartlepool United. He made seven league appearances for the club before transferring to Scottish Football League Second Division outfit Berwick Rangers midway through the season. Bassett scored three times in six league matches, but left the club at the end of the 1983–84 campaign.

He then went on to build a football career in Belgium, playing for clubs such as Eendracht aalst, RAEC Mons, Olympic Chaleroi and Standard Wetteren.
