= Graham White =

Graham White may refer to:

- Graham White (swimmer) (born 1951), Australian freestyle swimmer
- Graham White (priest) (1884–1945), Archdeacon of Singapore, 1931–1945
- Graham White (politician) (1880–1965), radical British Liberal Party politician
- Graham White (rugby league), Australian rugby league player

== See also ==
- Claude Grahame-White, English aviator (1879–1959)
- Grahame-White, a British aircraft and motorcar manufacturing company
