= Graham Ryan =

Australian rules footballer

Personal information
- Full name: Graham Ryan
- Born: 28 August 1940
- Died: 3 October 2010 (aged 70)
- Original team: Coburg
- Height: 185 cm (6 ft 1 in)
- Weight: 76 kg (168 lb)

Playing career^{1}
Years	Club	Games (Goals)
1960–62, 1965	North Melbourne	43 (5)
- ^{1} Playing statistics correct to the end of 1965.

Graham Ryan (28 August 1940 – 3 October 2010) was an Australian rules footballer who played with North Melbourne in the Victorian Football League (VFL).
