= Graham Quinn =

Graham Quinn may refer to:

- Graham Quinn (athlete) (1912–1987), New Zealand track and field athlete
- Graham Quinn (rugby league) (born 1957), Australian former rugby league footballer
