= Graham Whitford =

Australian cricketer (born 1938)

Personal information
- Born: 25 July 1938 (age 88); Melbourne, Australia

Domestic team information
- Years: Team
- 1962-1963: Victoria
- Source: Cricinfo, 4 December 2015

Graham Whitford (born 25 July 1938) is an Australian former cricketer. He played two first-class cricket matches for Victoria between 1962 and 1963.

== See also ==
- List of Victoria first-class cricketers
