= Graham Spring =

Australian cricketer (born 1961)

Personal information
- Born: 20 April 1961 (age 65); Sydney, Australia
- Source: Cricinfo, 2 February 2017

Graham Spring (born 20 April 1961) is an Australian cricketer. He played one first-class and four List A matches for New South Wales between 1982/83 and 1983/84.

== See also ==
- List of New South Wales representative cricketers
