= Graham Tudor =

Australian rules footballer

Personal information
- Full name: Graham Kell Tudor
- Born: 30 October 1920; Hobart, Tasmania
- Died: 3 April 1999 (aged 78); Melbourne, Victoria
- Original team: Cananore
- Height: 188 cm (6 ft 2 in)
- Weight: 84 kg (185 lb)

Playing career^{1}
| Years | Club | Games (Goals) |
| 1943–44 | Carlton | 19 (6) |
- ^{1} Playing statistics correct to the end of 1944.

Graham Kell Tudor (30 October 1920 – 3 April 1999) is a former Australian rules footballer who played with Carlton in the Victorian Football League (VFL).
