= Graham Oxenden =

English cricketer

Personal information
- Born: 23 January 1802; Wingham, Kent
- Died: 8 December 1826 (aged 24)

Domestic team information
- Years: Team
- 1822: Cambridge University
- Source: CricketArchive, 24 March 2013

Graham Oxenden (23 January 1802 – 8 December 1826) was an English cricketer who played for Cambridge University in one match, totalling 0 runs with a highest score of 0.

Oxenden was born at Broome Park, Kent, the family seat of the Oxenden baronets. His father was Sir Henry Oxenden, 7th Baronet; one of his brothers, Charles Oxenden, was also a cricketer. Graham Oxenden was educated at Harrow School and Christ's College, Cambridge. He graduated in 1825 and died in the following year.

== Bibliography ==
- Haygarth, Arthur (1862). Scores & Biographies, Volume 1 (1744–1826). Lillywhite.
