= Graham Nesbitt =

British basketball player

Graham Nesbitt (born 18 February 1983 in Plymouth, Devon, England) is a professional British basketball player, and currently plays for the Plymouth Raiders in the British Basketball League.

Nesbitt spent a few years overseas in the United States with the foreign exchange program. He lived in Lebo, Kansas and played his senior year of high school basketball as a Lebo Wolf. Also played tennis at ICC in Independence, Kansas.

The 6-foot 5 forward attended Indiana University-Purdue University Fort Wayne and, following a brief spell in 2003/04 with Solent Stars, is now in his rookie season as a professional basketball player with his hometown team the Plymouth Raiders.
