= Graham Reynolds =

Graham Reynolds may refer to:

- Graham Reynolds (art historian) (1914–2013), English historian
- Graham Reynolds (composer) (born 1971), American composer
- Graham Reynolds (cricketer) (1937–2008), Welsh cricketer
