= Graham Heal =

Australian rules footballer (1945–2018)

Personal information
- Full name: Graham Heal
- Born: 16 February 1945
- Died: 16 September 2018 (aged 73)
- Original team: Subiaco
- Height: 179 cm (5 ft 10 in)
- Weight: 80 kg (176 lb)
- Position: Wing

Playing career^{1}
Years	Club	Games (Goals)
1965-67, 1970–71	Subiaco	60 (19)
1968	North Melbourne	5 (0)
1972–77	West Perth	62 (0)
- ^{1} Playing statistics correct to the end of 1977.

Graham Heal (16 February 1945 – 16 September 2018) was an Australian rules footballer who played with Subiaco and West Perth in the West Australian Football League (WAFL) and North Melbourne in the Victorian Football League (VFL).

He is the son of Stan Heal, who is a member of the Australian Football Hall of Fame.
