= Graham Taylor (disambiguation) =

Graham Taylor (1944–2017) was an English footballer and manager.

Graham Taylor may also refer to:

- G. P. Taylor (Graham Peter Taylor, born 1958), British novelist and part-time priest
- Graham Taylor (baseball) (born 1984), Major League Baseball player
- Graham Taylor (theologian) (1851–1938)
- Graham Taylor (footballer, born 1998), Scottish footballer
- Graham R. Taylor, American social reformer during the Progressive Era.

== See also ==
- Douglas Graham Taylor (1936–2009), politician in Saskatchewan, Canada
- Graeme Taylor (born 1954), British guitarist
- Graeme Taylor (footballer) (born 1942), Australian rules footballer for Footscray
