= Graham Scott =

Graham Scott may refer to:

- Graham Scott (public servant) (born 1942), former official of the New Zealand government and political candidate
- Graham W. S. Scott (public servant) (born 1942), Canadian lawyer and public servant
- Graham Scott (footballer) (born 1946), former Australian rules footballer
- Graham Scott (referee) (born 1968), English football referee
