= Graham Boal =

British judge (1943–2022)

John Graham Boal (24 October 1943 – 30 December 2022), styled His Honour Judge Boal KC, was a British judge and author. He wrote a book about his alcoholism.

Graham Boal QC was a criminal barrister for thirty years before serving as a judge for nine years until his retirement as a Permanent Judge at London's Central Criminal Court, the Old Bailey, in 2005. He was a trustee and board member of WDP, an addiction charity.

Boal was involved in several very high-profile criminal trials, including those of the IRA's Balcombe Street Gang in 1977, and of Liberal Party leader Jeremy Thorpe in 1979. He was also involved initially in prosecuting the Birmingham Six in 1975, and later in overturning their conviction in 1991.

In 1999 while serving as a judge at the Old Bailey, he delivered a joke during a speech to the Criminal Bar Association that was widely criticized as racist, sexist, and homophobic, and resulted in his censure by the lord chancellor and being forced to apologise. He regretted it, but it haunted him thereafter and became an indelible stain on his otherwise very successful career as a criminal barrister.
