= Graham Jacobs (footballer) =

Australian rules footballer

Personal information
- Full name: Graham Jacobs
- Born: 22 November 1940
- Height: 170 cm (5 ft 7 in)
- Weight: 67 kg (148 lb)
- Position: Rover

Playing career^{1}
Years	Club	Games (Goals)
1959–63	Richmond	50 (50)
- ^{1} Playing statistics correct to the end of 1963.

Graham Jacobs (born 22 November 1940) is a former Australian rules footballer who played for Richmond in the Victorian Football League (VFL).
