= Graham Wattley =

Graham Richard Wattley (12 March 1930 – 28 November 2017) was a British public servant who was the Director of the Driver and Vehicle Licensing Centre of the Department of Transport in the United Kingdom between 1985 and 1990.

== Career ==
After finishing his secondary education at Devonport High School for Boys, Wattley served for a year as a pilot officer in the RAF, before beginning a career in the Civil Service. He initially served within the Ministry of Works between 1950 and 1971, before moving to the Department of the Environment (1971–1973) and then the Department of Transport. Most of his time with the Department of Transport was spent with the Driver and Vehicle Licensing Centre (now the DVLA), of which he was appointed Director in 1985. Under his leadership, the public reputation and efficiency of the DVLC improved, and he also worked to raise the sense of corporate identity among the staff. He retired from his position in 1990.

== Personal life ==
Wattley later resided in Swansea with his second wife. His first wife, Yvonne (née Heale), whom he married in 1953, died in 1990. Wattley then remarried in 1997, to Rose Daniel (née Dawson). He had three children from his first marriage.

Amongst his interests, Wattley listed walking, cooking and birdwatching. This first interest led him to spend ten years as a Walk Leader for HF Holidays. He was also a Christian, serving as a member of the governing body of the Church in Wales between 1992 and 1994 and a Warden of St Paul's Church, Sketty from 1991 to 1996. He continued to be involved in this church, and was the chair of the Sketty PCC.

Wattley died on 28 November 2017, at the age of 87.
