= Graham Henderson =

Graham Henderson may refer to:

- Graham Henderson (badminton) (born 1961), Northern Irish badminton player
- Graham Henderson (Canadian lawyer), Canadian lawyer and president of Music Canada
- Graham Henderson (cultural entrepreneur) (born 1964), British solicitor and entrepreneur
- Graham Henderson, Vice-Chancellor of Teesside University from 2003 to 2014
- Graham L. Henderson, Scottish architect, and father of Malaysian actress Amelia Thripura Henderson
- Graham Henderson, musician in Irish Celtic rock band Moving Hearts

== See also ==
- Graeme Henderson
