= Graham Urwin =

English footballer

Personal information
- Full name: Graham Edward Urwin
- Date of birth: 15 February 1949
- Place of birth: South Shields, England
- Position: Outside right

Senior career*
Years	Team	Apps	(Gls)
1967–1968	Darlington	1	(0)
–	South Shields		
- * Club domestic league appearances and goals

Graham Edward Urwin (born 15 February 1949) is an English former footballer who played as an outside right in the Football League for Darlington and in non-league football for South Shields. Urwin appeared only once for Darlington's first team, playing the whole of the Fourth Division match at home to Southend United on 21 October 1967 as replacement for regular winger Don Ratcliffe.
