= Graham Kennedy (disambiguation) =

Graham Kennedy (1934–2005) was an Australian entertainer, comedian and variety performer.

Graham Kennedy may also refer to:

- Graham Kennedy (rugby league) (1939–2002), New Zealand rugby league footballer and coach
- Graham Kennedy (cricketer) (born 1999), Irish cricketer
