= Graham Renshaw =

Dr Graham Renshaw FRSE FZS LRCP (1872–1952) was a 20th-century British physician and noted biologist. He was editor of the "Avicultural Magazine" from 1917 to August 1920 and editor of "Natureland".

== Life ==
Renshaw studied medicine at the University of Manchester, graduating with an MB.

In 1914, he was elected a Fellow of the Royal Society of Edinburgh. His proposers were Herbert Bolton, William Evans Hoyle, Robert Kidston and James Hartley Ashworth. He practiced medicine in Manchester and taught Zoology as an extramural subject at the University of Manchester.

He was Vice President of the Manchester Medical Society.

Renshaw has published several books and many articles, for instance in The Zoologist.

He died on 13 January 1952.

== Publications ==
- The Avicultural Magazine.
- Renshaw, Graham (1901). "The True Quagga". The Zoologist. 4. 5 (716, February): 41–50.
- —— (1901). "Notes on the Egyptian Jerboa (Dipus jaculus) in Captivity". The Zoologist. 4th series, vol 5 (722, August): 305–309.
- —— (1901). "The Blaauwbok (Hippotragus leucophæus)". The Zoologist. 4th series, vol 5 (726, December): 441–448.
- Natural History Essays. London : Sheratt & Hughes (1904)
- More Natural History Essays. London : Sheratt & Hughes (1905)
- Bird Life at Manchester Zoo (1920)
