= Graham Thornicroft =

British researcher

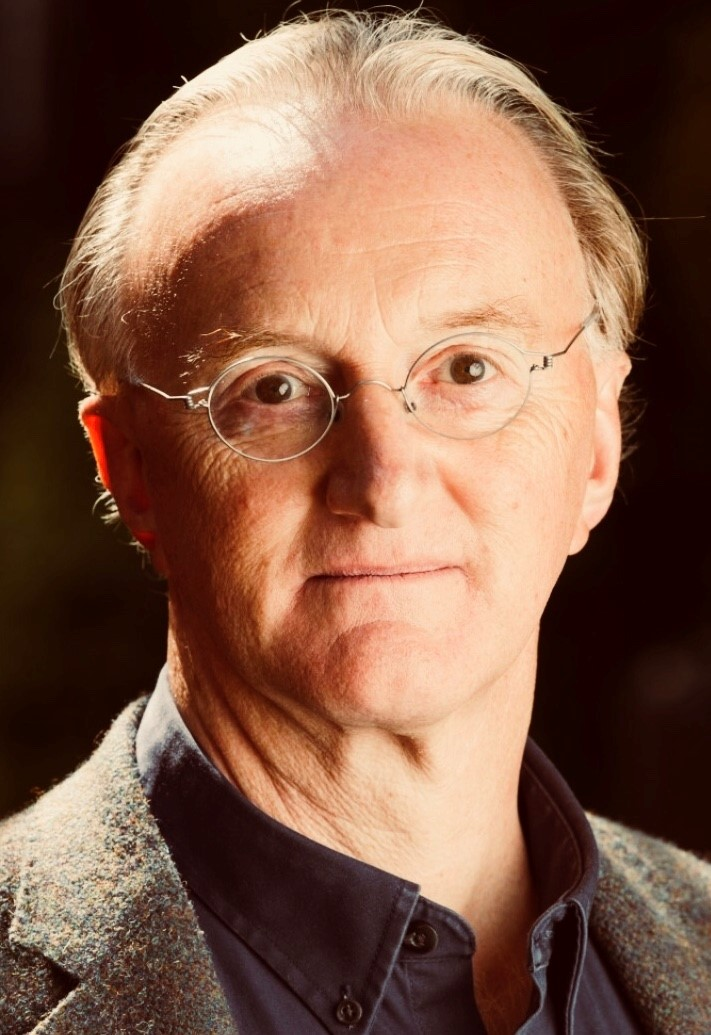
Graham Thornicroft

Sir Graham Thornicroft FRCPsych FMedSci is a British psychiatrist, researcher and Professor Emeritus of Community Mental Health at the Centre for Global Mental Health and Centre for Implementation Science at King's College London. He also a Consultant Psychiatrist working at a community mental health team at the South London and Maudsley NHS Foundation Trust. He is best known for his work on community mental health services, stigma and discrimination, and global mental health. He has published over 30 books, and has written over 700 peer-reviewed scientific papers. Graham was made a Knight Bachelor in the 2017 Queen's Birthday Honours for services to mental health.

== Education and early life ==
Graham gained a first class honours degree in Social and Political Sciences from Queens’ College, University of Cambridge. After almost a year working as a residential social worker in Labrador, Canada, he studied medicine at Guy’s Hospital, and then trained in psychiatry at both the Maudsley and Johns Hopkins Hospitals. He completed an MSc in Epidemiology at the London School of Hygiene and Tropical Medicine and went on to finish his PhD at the University of London, focusing on the positive outcomes of discharging long-term psychiatric in-patients to community care.

In November 2019, Graham was interviewed on the BBC World Service series, The Inquiry, in a radio documentary called What can we do about the world's mental health problems? He disclosed that he had been inspired to become a psychiatrist by a period in his childhood when his mother experienced severe depression. Graham's mother received treatment, made a full recovery and then returned to work as a nurse.

== Career ==
Graham is a consultant psychiatrist at the South London and Maudsley NHS Foundation Trust. He was the founding head of the Health Services and Population Research Department at the Institute of Psychiatry, Psychology and Neuroscience at King's College London (KCL). He was the founder of King's Improvement Science, and the Centre for Implementation Science at KCL. Graham is a founding member of the Movement for Global Mental Health, a network of 200 institutions and over 10,000 individuals involved in improving services for people living with mental health conditions and psycho-social disabilities worldwide. He was the director of the National Institute for Health Research Applied Research Collaboration (ARC) in South London until 2024.

== Mental health policy ==
Graham Chaired the External Reference Group to create the National Service Framework for Mental Health in England. Published in 1999, this was a 10-year national mental health plan that transformed the provision of mental health care across England.

=== Stigma and discrimination research ===
In 2006, Graham published Shunned: Discrimination against People with Mental Illness and this won the British Medical Association Award for Best Mental Health Book of the Year. With Professor Norman Sartorius, he established the INDIGO Network, a research collaboration of colleagues in over 40 countries worldwide who work to reduce mental health related stigma and discrimination. He has published over 140 scientific papers on stigma and discrimination, including papers on the evaluation of Time to Change, the national programme to reduce stigma and discrimination in England. With Charlene Sunkel, the Founder and CEO of the Global Mental Health Peer Network, he Co-Chaired the 2022 Lancet Commission on Ending Stigma and Discrimination in Mental Health.

=== Global mental health ===
Graham chaired the Guideline Development Group for the World Health Organisation Mental Health Global Action Plan (mhGAP) Implementation Guide for its 1st, 2nd and 3rd editions in 2010, 2015 and 2023. These guidelines have been implemented in over 100 countries. In 2014, Graham and Dr. Nicole Votruba coordinated the FundaMentalSDG initiative which contributed to the adoption of mental health related indicators within the United Nations Sustainable Development Goals.

Graham is a member of an international group which produced the 2007 Lancet Global Mental Health series aiming to 'highlight the gaps in mental-health services worldwide, and to formulate a clear call to action'. In 2018, he was one of the four lead editors of The Lancet Commission on Global Mental Health and Sustainable Development. Graham was a Principal Investigator of the Community Psycho Social Intervention (COPSI) study in India, a Welcome Trust randomised controlled trial of community mental health teams in Chennai, Goa and Maharashtra. He has also led the Emerald Programme (Emerging Mental Health Systems in Low- and Middle-Income Countries), funded by the European Commission under the 7th Framework Programme. In 2017, the project results were presented in the House of Commons in London. Graham is the chair of the board of United for Global Mental Health.

== Awards ==
Graham has received more than 170 research funding awards, to a total value of over £130 million. In 2009, Graham and his colleagues at the Health Services and Population Research Department at the IoPPN at KCL received the Queen’s Award Prize for Further and Higher Education for work of outstanding excellence. With Professor Claire Henderson he has co-led the evaluation of the Time to Change anti-stigma programme in England, and in 2020 this was recognised by Royal Society of Public Health as one of the Top 20 Public Health Achievements of the 21st century. In 2022 Graham received the Rema Lapouse Award from the Mental Health, Epidemiology, and Statistics Sections of the American Public Health Association in recognition of 'significant contributions to the scientific understanding of the epidemiology, and control of mental disorders.'

== Books ==
Graham has written or co-authored 31 books:

- Thornicroft G. Brewin C. & Wing J.K. (1992) Measuring Mental Health Needs. Royal College of Psychiatrists, Gaskell Press, London.
- Phelan M. Strathdee G. and Thornicroft G. (1995) Emergency Mental Health services in the Community. Cambridge University Press, Cambridge.
- Knudsen H. & Thornicroft G. (1996) Mental Health Service Evaluation. Cambridge University Press, Cambridge. (Translated into Italian).
- Thornicroft G. & Strathdee G. (1996). Commissioning Mental Health Services. HMSO London.
- Tansella M. & Thornicroft G. (1996) Mental Health Outcome Measures (1st). Springer Verlag, Berlin
- Johnson S. Ramsay R. Thornicroft G. Brooks E. Lelliot P. Peck E. Smith H. Chisholm D. Audini B. Knapp M. & Goldberg D. (1997) London’s Mental Health. King’s Fund, London. (First and Second editions).
- Goldberg D. & Thornicroft G. (1998) Mental Health in Our Future Cities. Laurence and Erlbaum, London
- Slade M. Thornicroft G. Loftus L. Phelan M. & Wykes T. (1999) Camberwell Assessment of Need (CAN). Royal College of Psychiatrist, Gaskell, London.
- Tansella M. & Thornicroft G. (1999) Common Mental Disorders in Primary Care. Essay in Honour of Professor Sir David Goldberg. Routledge, London. (Translated into Portuguese).
- Thornicroft G. & Tansella M. (1999) The Mental Health Matrix. A Manual to Improve Services. Cambridge University Press, Cambridge. (Translated into Italian, Rumanian, Russian and Spanish).
- Reynolds A. & Thornicroft G. (1999) Managing Mental Health Services. Open University Press, Milton Keynes. (Translated into Italian and Portuguese) (Highly Commended in BMA Medical Book Awards, 2000).
- Thornicroft G. & Szmukler G. (2001) Textbook of Community Psychiatry. Oxford University Press, Oxford. (Highly Commended in BMA Medical Book Awards, 2002).
- Tansella M. & Thornicroft G (2001) Mental Health Outcome Measures (2nd Edition). Gaskell, Royal College of Psychiatrists, London.
- Thornicroft G. (2001) Measuring Mental Health Needs (2nd edition). Gaskell, Royal College of Psychiatrist, London.
- Xenitidis K. Slade M. Thornicroft G. & Bouras N. (2003) Camberwell Assessment of Need for Adults with Developmental and Intellectual Disabilities (CANDID). A comprehensive needs assessment tool for people with learning disabilities (mental retardation) and mental health problems. Gaskell, Royal College of Psychiatrists, London.
- Thomas S. Harty M.A. Parrott J. McCrone P. Slade M. & Thornicroft G. (2006) The Forensic CAN: A needs assessment for forensic mental health service users. London: Gaskell.
- Thornicroft G. Becker T. Knapp M. Knudsen H. C. Schene A. Tansella M. & Vazquez-Barquero J-L. (2006) International Outcome Measures in Mental Health. Quality of Life, Needs, Service Satisfaction, Costs and Impact on Carers. Gaskell, Royal College of Psychiatrists, London.
- Thornicroft G. (2006) Shunned: Discrimination against People with Mental Illness. Oxford University Press, Oxford (Winner of BMA Book of the Year Award: Mental Health Category, 2007) (Translated into Japanese and Turkish)
- Thornicroft G. (2006) Actions speak louder: tackling discrimination against people with mental illness. Mental Health Foundation, London.
- Knapp M. McDaid D. Mossialos E. & Thornicroft G. (Eds) (2007) Mental Health Policy and Practice Across Europe. The Future Direction of Mental Health Care. Open University Press (Winner of the 2007 Baxter Award of the European Health Management Association).
- Johnson S. Needle J. Bindman J. & Thornicroft G. (eds) (2008) Crisis Resolution and Home Treatment in Mental Health. Cambridge University Press, Cambridge.
- Howard L. Hunt K. Slade M. O’Keane V. Seneviratne T. Leese M. & Thornicroft G. (2008) Camberwell Assessment of Need: Mother's Version (CAN-M). A needs-based assessment for pregnant women and mothers with severe mental illness. Gaskell, Royal College of Psychiatrists, London.
- Thornicroft G. & Tansella M. (2009) Better Mental Health Care. Cambridge University Press, Cambridge. (Translated into: Chinese, Georgian, Greek, Italian, Japanese, Polish, Portuguese, Serbian, Spanish and Serbian and Vietnamese)
- Thornicroft G. & Tansella M. (2010) (3rd edition). Mental Health Outcome Measures. RCPsych. London. (Highly Commended in BMA Medical Book Awards, 2011).
- Thornicroft G. Drake RE., Mueser K. & Szmukler G. (2011) Oxford Textbook of Community Mental Health. Oxford University Press, Oxford
- Thornicroft G., Alem A., Drake RE., Ito H., Mari J., McGeorge P., Thara R. & Semrau M. (2011) Community mental health: putting policy into practice globally. London: Wiley-Blackwell. (Highly Commended in BMA Medical Book Awards, 2012).
- Callard F. Sartorius N. Arboleda-Florez J. Bartlett P. Helmchen H. Stuart H. Taborda J. & Thornicroft G. (2012) Mental Illness, Discrimination and the Law: Fighting for Social Justice. London: Wiley-Blackwell.
- Wright A. Thornicroft G. & Randolph J. (2012) A view from inside. White-Card, London.
- Thornicroft G. Ruggeri M. & Goldberg D. (2013) Improving Mental Health Care: the Global Challenge. London: Wiley-Blackwell. (Highly Commended in BMA Medical Book Awards, 2014).
- Thornicroft G. & Patel V. (2014) Global Mental Health Trials. Oxford University Press, Oxford.
- Thornicroft G. Drake RE., Gureje O., Mueser K. & Szmukler G. (2024) Oxford Textbook of Community Mental Health (2nd edition). Oxford University Press, Oxford.
