= Graham Kelly =

Graham Kelly may refer to:

- Graham Kelly (politician) (born 1941), New Zealand politician and High Commissioner to Canada
- Graham Kelly (football administrator) (born 1945), English football administrator
- Graham Kelly (footballer, born 1991), Irish professional footballer
- Graham Kelly (footballer, born 1997), Irish professional footballer
