= Graham Fletcher =

Graham Fletcher may refer to:

- Graham Fletcher (diplomat), Australian ambassador to China
- Graham Fletcher (equestrian), British Olympian
