= Graham Hobbins =

English cricketer

Personal information
- Full name: Graham Raymond Hobbins
- Born: 27 February 1946 (age 80); Eastbourne, Sussex, England
- Batting: Right-handed
- Bowling: Right-arm fast-medium

Domestic team information
- Years: Team
- 1972–1986: Oxfordshire

Career statistics
Competition	List A
Matches	4
Runs scored	36
Batting average	12.00
100s/50s	–/–
Top score	15*
Balls bowled	216
Wickets	3
Bowling average	49.66
5 wickets in innings	–
10 wickets in match	–
Best bowling	2/57
Catches/stumpings	1/–
- Source: Cricinfo, 24 May 2011

Graham Raymond Hobbins (born 27 February 1946) is a former English cricketer. Hobbins was a right-handed batsman who bowled right-arm fast-medium.

== Biography ==
He was born in Eastbourne, Sussex, but his family moved to Rhodesia in 1947 where he attended Umtali Boys High School. Hobbins moved back to the UK in 1964, and made his debut for Oxfordshire in the 1972 Minor Counties Championship against Dorset. Hobbins played Minor counties cricket for Oxfordshire from 1972 to 1986, which included 36 Minor Counties Championship matches and 7 MCCA Knockout Trophy matches. He made his List A debut against Gloucestershire in the 1972 Gillette Cup. He played 3 further List A matches, the last coming against Worcestershire in the 1986 NatWest Trophy. In his 4 List A matches, he scored 36 runs at a batting average of 12.00, with a high score of 15. With the ball, he took 3 wickets at a bowling average of 49.66, with best figures of 2/57.
