= Graham Settree =

Australian rugby league footballer

Personal information
- Full name: Graham Settree

Playing information
- Position: Second-row
Club
Years	Team	Pld	T	G	FG	P
1984–88	Parramatta Eels	29	3	0	0	12
1989	Penrith Panthers	2	0	0	0	0
1990	Newcastle Knights	2	0	0	0	0
	Total	33	3	0	0	12
- Source: As of 6 February 2019

Graham Settree is a former professional rugby league footballer who played in the 1980s and 1990s. He played for the Parramatta Eels from 1984 to 1988, for the Penrith Panthers in 1989 and finally for the Newcastle Knights in 1990.

== Playing career ==
Settree made his first grade debut for Parramatta in the eighteenth round of the 1984 season; Parramatta beat Western Suburbs 48–12. In 1989, he joined Penrith, but he made only two appearances for the club before signing with Newcastle. After making just two appearances for Newcastle too, he retired at the end of 1990.
