= Graham Marshall =

Graham Marshall may refer to:

- Graham Marshall (rugby union) (born 1960), Scottish international rugby union player
- Graham Marshall (footballer), New Zealand footballer
