= Graham Hunt =

Graham Hunt may refer to:

- Graham Hunt (politician) (born 1979), American politician
- Graham Hunt (musician), American musician
