= Graham (surname) =

Origin
- Region of origin: Scotland (widespread), England

Other names
- Variant forms: Grantham, Graeme, Gormley

Graham (/ˈɡreɪəm, ɡræm/) is a surname of Scottish and English origin. It is typically an Anglo-French form of the name of the town of Grantham, in Lincolnshire, England. The settlement is recorded in the 11th-century Domesday Book variously as Grantham, Grandham, Granham and Graham. This place name is thought to be derived from the Old English elements grand, possibly meaning "gravel", and ham, meaning "hamlet" the English word given to small settlements of smaller size than villages.

== Variants and use ==
In the 12th century, the surname was taken from England to Scotland by Sir William de Graham, who founded Clan Graham. The surname was later taken to Northern Ireland by settlers from Scotland and England in the 17th century. Variant spellings are Grahame and Graeme.

Its origin as a surname has led to its use as a given name, as for example in the case of Graham Cockburn, a daughter of Henry Cockburn, Lord Cockburn. The surname is presently commonly used as a masculine given name (see Graham given name).

== Notable people ==
- Alasdair Graham (1929–2015), Canadian politician, journalist, and businessman
- Alasdair Graham (pianist) (1934–2016), British concert pianist
- Alexander Graham (disambiguation), multiple people
- Alexina Graham (born 1990), British fashion model
- Alfonzo Graham (born 2000), American football player
- Sir Alistair Graham (born 1942), British politician
- Alvin Edwin Graham, Canadian politician
- Andrew Graham (disambiguation), multiple people
- Angus Charles Graham (1919–1991), British philosopher
- Ann Graham (disambiguation), multiple people
- Ashley Graham (model) (born 1987), American plus-sized model and television presenter
- Aubrey Drake Graham (born 1986), Canadian actor and rapper better known as Drake
- B. L. Graham (1914–2001), American college basketball player and coach
- Barbara Graham (1923–1955), American murderer
- Barney S. Graham (born 1953), American immunologist, virologist, and clinical trials physician
- Ben Graham (disambiguation), multiple people
- Bill Graham (disambiguation), multiple people
- The Graham family of American religious figures:
  - Billy Graham (1918–2018), evangelist and family patriarch
  - Ruth Bell Graham (1920–2007), author and Billy's wife
  - Virginia "Gigi" Graham (born 1945), author; oldest daughter of Billy and Ruth
  - Anne Graham Lotz (born 1948), evangelist; second daughter of Billy and Ruth
  - Franklin Graham (born 1952), evangelist; oldest son and fourth child of Billy and Ruth
  - Will Graham (born 1975), evangelist; son of Franklin
- Bob Graham (disambiguation), multiple people
- Brett Graham (born 1967), New Zealand sculptor
- Bruce Graham (1925–2010), Colombian architect
- Calvin Graham (1930–1992), American sailor
- Charles Graham (disambiguation), multiple people
- Charlotte Graham (born 1972), New Zealand artist
- Charlotte Duncan Smith Graham (1912–1993), American labor organizer
- Cork Graham (born 1964), American author
- Currie Graham (born 1967), Canadian actor
- Dale Graham (born 1951), Canadian politician
- Daniel Graham (disambiguation), multiple people
- Darcy Graham (born 1997), Scottish rugby player
- Darline Graham (born 1964), American politician; younger sister of Lindsey Graham
- David Graham (disambiguation), multiple people
- Derek Graham-Couch, Scottish professional wrestler
- Devin Graham, American cinematographer, YouTuber
- Dick Graham (1922–2013), English footballer and manager
- Dion Graham, American actor and narrator
- Dirk Graham (born 1959), Canadian ice hockey player
- Donald Graham (disambiguation), multiple people
- Douglas Graham, 5th Duke of Montrose (1852–1925), Scottish nobleman
- Edward Graham (disambiguation), multiple people
- Elle Graham (born 2009), American TV and film actress
- Elyse Graham, American writer and historian
- Enid Gordon Graham (1894–1974), Canadian physiotherapist
- Eric Graham (1888–1964), Irish bishop
- Evarts Ambrose Graham (1883–1957), American surgeon and professor
- Eve Graham (born 1943), Scottish singer
- Frank Graham (disambiguation), multiple people
- Fred Graham (disambiguation), multiple people
- Gary Graham (born 1950), American actor
- Gavin L. Graham (1894–1963), South African World War I flying ace
- George Graham (disambiguation), multiple people
- Gerald Graham (1831–1899), English soldier
- Gerald S. Graham (1903–1988), Canadian-British imperial and naval historian
- Gerrit Graham (born 1949), American actor and writer
- Gwen Graham (born 1963), American politician
- Harry Graham (disambiguation), multiple people
- Heather Graham (actress) (born 1970), American actress
- Helen Matthews (1857/8-?), also known by her pseudonym Mrs Graham, Scottish suffragette and footballer
- Herol Graham (born 1958), British boxer
- Hiram P. Graham (1820–1902), American politician
- Ian Graham (disambiguation), multiple people
- Jack Graham (disambiguation), multiple people
- Jaeden Graham (born 1995), American football player
- Jalen Graham (born 2001), American football player
- James Graham (disambiguation), multiple people
- Jamie Graham, Canadian police chief
- Jaymie Graham, Australian rules footballer
- Jeff Graham, American football player
- Jeff Graham (quarterback), American football player
- John Graham (disambiguation), multiple people
- Jorie Graham (born 1950), Pulitzer Prize–winning American poet
- Joseph Graham (footballer) (1889–1968), English footballer
- Julie Graham (born 1965), Scottish actress
- Katharine Graham (1917–2001) (also known as Kay Graham), American publisher of The Washington Post, successor to her husband, Philip
- Kathleen Margaret Graham (1913–2008), Canadian artist
- Kenny Graham (musician) (1924–1997), English jazz musician and composer
- Kenny Graham (American football) (born 1941), Kenneth James "Kenny" Graham, American football safety
- Ken Graham, American meteorologist
- Kenneth Grahame (1859–1932), British writer
- Kevin Graham, Canadian water polo player
- Kyle "Skinny" Graham (1899–1973), Major League Baseball pitcher
- Larry Graham (born 1946), American bass guitar player, member of Sly and the Family Stone
- Larry Graham (politician) (born 1950), Australian politician
- Lauren Graham (born 1967), American actress
- Leona Graham (born 1971), British radio presenter
- Leonard Graham (disambiguation), multiple people
- Lindsey Graham (1955–2026), American politician
- Lollie Graham (1924–2008), Shetland writer
- Loren Graham (1933–2024), American historian of science
- Lou Graham (born 1938), American professional golfer
- Louis E. Graham (1880–1965), U.S. politician from Pennsylvania
- Luke Graham (disambiguation), multiple people
- Malise Graham, 1st Earl of Menteith (1406–1490), Scottish magnate
- Mark Graham (disambiguation), multiple people
- Martha Graham (1894–1991), American dancer and choreographer
- Martin H. Graham (1926–2015), American professor of Electrical Engineering and Computer Sciences
- Mary Lou Graham (born 1936), All-American Girls Professional Baseball League player
- Mary Olstine Graham (1842–1902), American educator in Argentina
- Mason Graham (born 2003), American football player
- Max Graham, Canadian DJ, composer and producer of dance music
- Michael Graham (disambiguation) (also: Mike)
- Moonlight Graham (1876–1965), American baseball player
- Mylan Graham (born 2006), American football player
- Myles Graham (born 2006), American football player
- Ogilvie Graham (1891–1971), Irish cricketer and British Army officer
- Otto Graham (1921–2003), American football and basketball player
- Patricia Graham (pilot), Australian aviator
- Patrick Graham (disambiguation), multiple people
- Paul Graham (disambiguation), multiple people
- Peter Graham (disambiguation), multiple people
- Phil Graham (1915–1963), American publisher
- Ralph Graham (American football) (1910–2005), American football player and coach
- Sir Reginald Graham, 3rd Baronet (1892–1980), Scottish soldier
- Richard Graham (disambiguation), multiple people
- Richey V. Graham (1886–1972), American politician
- Robert Graham (disambiguation), multiple people
- Ron Graham (disambiguation), multiple people
- Ruth Bell Graham (1920–2007), American writer and philanthropist
- Sam Graham (born 2000), English footballer
- Sam Graham (footballer, born 1874), Scottish footballer
- Sharon Graham(born 1968), British trade unionist
- Shawn Graham (born 1968), New Brunswick politician
- Skinny Graham (outfielder) (1909–1967), American baseball player
- Stan Graham (1926–2010), Canadian politician
- Stanley Graham (1900–1941), New Zealand mass murderer
- Stephen Graham (disambiguation), multiple people
- Steve Graham, Australian Paralympic coach
- Susan Graham (born 1960), American mezzo-soprano singer
- Susan L. Graham, American computer scientist
- Susannah Sarah Washington Graham (1816–1890), American political hostess
- Sylvester Graham (1794–1851), American nutritionist
- Sylvi Graham (1951–2025), Norwegian politician
- Ta'Quon Graham (born 1998), American football player
- Ted Graham, Baron Graham of Edmonton (1925–2020), British Labour Co-operative politician
- Ted Graham (ice hockey) (1904–1979), Canadian hockey player
- Tegan Graham (born 1997), New Zealand basketball player
- Thaddea Graham, Chinese-Northern Irish actress
- Thomas Graham (disambiguation), multiple people
- Tiny Graham (1892–1962), American baseball player
- Toby Graham (1920–2013), British cross-country skier and historian
- Todd Graham, American college football coach
- Treveon Graham (born 1993), American basketball player
- Wallace H. Graham (1910–1996), American physician
- Wallace Wilson Graham, American lawyer and politician
- Wayne Graham, American college baseball coach
- W. S. Graham (1918–1986), Scottish poet
- William Graham (disambiguation), multiple people
- Winston Graham (1908–2003), English novelist
- Winthrop Graham (born 1965), Jamaican athlete

== See also ==
- Duke of Montrose
- Clan Graham
- Graham baronets
- Graham (disambiguation)
- Judge Graham (disambiguation)
- Justice Graham (disambiguation)
- Grahame (surname)
