= William A. Graham =

William A. Graham may refer to:

- William Alexander Graham (1804–1875), American politician; Whig from North Carolina
- William Australia Graham (1841–1916), New Zealand surveyor, mediator, farmer, politician and mayor
- William A. Graham (agriculture commissioner) (1839–1923), American politician and Civil War veteran
- William A. Graham (director) (1926–2013), American television and film director
- William A. Graham (dean) (born 1943), dean of Harvard Divinity School from 2002 to 2012

== See also ==
- William Graham (disambiguation)
- Graham (surname)
