= Grahame =

Grahame is a surname or given name. Notable people with the name include:

== Surname ==
- Alan Grahame (1954–2021), British motorcycle speedway rider
- Amanda Grahame (born 1979), Australian tennis player
- Andy Grahame (born 1957), English motorcycle speedway rider
- Bill Grahame (1884–1936), American baseball player
- Charlotte Grahame, American hockey director
- Christine Grahame (born 1944), Scottish politician
- Eila Grahame (1935–2009), English antique dealer
- George Dixon Grahame (1873–1940), British diplomat
- Gloria Grahame (1923–1981), American actress
- Jack Grahame (1933–2013), Australian lawyer
- James Grahame (1756–1811), Scottish poet
- James Grahame, Lord Easdale (1696–1750), Scottish lawyer and landowner
- John Grahame (born 1975), American ice hockey player
- Kenneth Grahame (1859–1932), Scottish novelist
- Margot Grahame (1911–1982), English actress
- Nikki Grahame (1982–2021), English Big Brother contestant
- Robert Cunninghame Graham of Gartmore (1735–1797), Scottish poet
- Ron Grahame (born 1950), Canadian ice hockey player
- Simon Grahame (1570–1614), Scottish writer
- Thomas Grahame (1840–1907), Canadian politician
- William Grahame (disambiguation), multiple people

== Given name ==
- Grahame Baker, Dean of Ontario
- Grahame Bilby (born 1941), New Zealand cricketer
- Grahame Bond (born 1943), Australian actor, writer, director, musician and composer
- Grahame Bowen (1946–2016), Australian rugby league footballer
- Grahame Buckley (1957–2016), Australian rugby league
- Grahame Budge (1920–1979), Scottish rugby player
- Grahame Bulfield (born 1941), English geneticist and professor
- Grahame Cheney (born 1969), Australian boxer
- Grahame Chevalier (1937–2017), South African cricketer
- Grahame Christie (1881–1971), British military attaché and intelligence officer
- Grahame Clark (1907–1995), British archaeologist
- Grahame Clarke (born 1965), English cricketer
- Grahame Clifford (1905–1984), English singer and actor
- Grahame Clinton (born 1953), English cricketer
- Grahame Dangerfield (died 2018), British naturalist, author and broadcaster
- Grahame Davies (born 1964), Welsh poet, editor, author, librettist, literary critic and journalist
- Grahame Davis, Scottish-New Zealand footballer
- Grahame Donald (1891–1976), British pilot and officer
- Grahame Egan (born 1941), Australian cricketer
- Grahame Farr (1912–1983), English maritime historian
- Grahame Garner (1928–2015), Australian photographer and political activist
- Grahame Hall (1919–1982), Australian rules footballer
- Grahame Hardie, Scottish biochemist
- Grahame Hodgson (1936–2016), Welsh rugby union player
- Grahame Jarratt (1929–2011), New Zealand rower
- Grahame King (1915–2008), Australian printmaker
- Grahame McConechy (1880–1942), Australian rules footballer
- Grahame McGifford (born 1955), English footballer
- Grahame Moran, Australian rugby league footballer
- Grahame Morris (born 1961), British politician
- Grahame Parker (1912–1995), English cricketer and rugby union player
- Grahame Skinner (born 1962), Scottish musician
- Grahame Smith (born 1959), Scottish trade unionist
- Grahame Sydney (born 1948), New Zealand visual artist
- Grahame Thomas (born 1938), Australian cricketer
- Grahame Thompson, economist and professor
- Grahame Thorne (born 1946), New Zealand rugby player, rugby commentator, politician and television host
- Grahame Vivian (1919–2015), British Army officer
- Grahame Wilson, Rhodesian Army officer
- Grahame Wood (born 1970), British-American actor

== See also ==
- SS Grahame, a sternwheeler, operated by the Hudson's Bay Company, on the Mackenzie River system
- Grahame House, a historic home in Maryland, United States
- Graham (given name)
- Graham (surname)
