= William Graham =

William Graham may refer to:

== Politics and government ==
- Sir William de Graham, 12th-century Scottish knight
- William Graham, 1st Earl of Montrose (1464–1513), Scottish nobleman
- William Graham, 2nd Earl of Montrose (died 1571), Scottish nobleman
- William Graham, 2nd Duke of Montrose (1712–1790), Scottish nobleman
- William Graham, 3rd Earl of Menteith (died 1543), Scottish magnate
- William Graham, 5th Earl of Menteith, 16th-century Scottish nobleman
- William Graham, 7th Earl of Menteith (1591–1661), Scottish nobleman
- William Graham, 8th Earl of Menteith (c. 1634–1694), Scottish nobleman
- William Graham (colonel) (1742–1835), North Carolina militia and political leader
- William Graham (Indiana politician) (1782–1858), U.S. representative from Indiana
- William Graham (Glasgow MP) (1817–1885), Scottish politician
- William Graham (Edinburgh MP) (1887–1932), British statesman
- William Graham (Welsh politician) (born 1949), assembly member from South Wales East
- William Alexander Graham (1804–1875), North Carolina governor, Secretary of the Navy and U.S. senator
- William Australia Graham (1841–1916), New Zealand surveyor, mediator, farmer, politician and mayor
- William A. Graham (agriculture commissioner) (1839–1923), North Carolina politician
- William A. Graham (Islamic studies scholar) (born 1943), American scholar of Middle Eastern studies
- William H. Graham (politician) (1844–1923), U.S. representative from Pennsylvania
- William J. Graham (1872–1937), U.S. representative from Illinois
- William Joseph Graham (1877–1963), American insurance executive
- William M. Graham (politician) (1819–1886), New York politician
- William Robert Graham (born 1937), former NASA administrator
- William Graham (Queensland politician) (1836–1892),
- Bill Graham (Canadian politician) (William Carvel Graham, 1939–2022)

== Sports ==
=== Soccer ===
- William Graham (winger), English footballer who played as a winger
- William Graham (footballer, born 1914) (1914–1996), English footballer who played as an inside forward
- Willie Graham (footballer, born 1866) (1866–1937), Scottish footballer
- Willie Graham (footballer, born 1959), Northern Irish footballer

=== Other sports ===
- William Graham (American football) (born 1959), American football player
- Will Graham (footballer) (born 2005), Australian rules footballer
- William Graham (cricketer) (1881–1961), New Zealand cricketer
- William Graham (field hockey) (1886–1947), Irish Olympic field hockey player
- William Woodman Graham (c. 1859–after 1932), British mountaineer
- Bill Graham (baseball) (1William Albert Graham, 1937–2006), American baseball player
- Billy Graham (American boxer) (William Walter Graham Jr., 1922–1992), American boxer
- Billy Graham (New Zealand boxer) (William Neil Graham, born 1947/1948), winner of four New Zealand titles at light welterweight
- Bill Graham (Canadian football) (William Douglas Lionel Graham, 1935–2020), Canadian football player for the Hamilton Tiger-Cats

== Other fields ==
- William Graham (British Army officer) (died 1747), British Army officer
- William Montrose Graham (1834–1916), major general in the United States Army
- William C. Graham (music professor) (c. 1817–1866), American music professor
- William H. Graham Jr., United States Army general
- William Miller Graham (1860–1930) was an oil tycoon known as the "California Oil King"
- Franklin Graham (William Franklin Graham III, born 1952), evangelist and missionary
- William Graham (Royal Navy officer) (1826–1907), British admiral
- William Graham (actor), known for his 1947 film Just William's Luck
- William Graham (director) (1926–2013), film director
- William Pratt Graham (1871–1962), electrical engineering professor
- Will Graham (evangelist) (William Franklin Graham IV, born 1975), son of Franklin and grandson of Billy
- Will Graham (producer), American producer, director, screenwriter
- Billy Graham (comics) (William Henderson Graham, 1935–1997), American comic book artist
- Bill Graham (musician) (William Henry Graham, 1918–1975), American jazz saxophonist
- Billy Graham (William Franklin Graham Jr., 1918–2018), American evangelist

== Fiction ==
- Will Graham (character), fictional character in the novel Red Dragon by Thomas Harris and in AMC series Hannibal

== Other uses ==
- SS William A. Graham, a 1942 World War II Liberty ship

== See also ==
- Bill Graham (disambiguation) for those known as Bill or Billy
- William Grahame (disambiguation)
