= John Graham =

John or Johnny Graham may refer to:

== Arts and entertainment ==
- John Graham (history painter) (fl. 1720–1775), English painter
- John Graham (Scottish painter) (1754–1817), Scottish painter and teacher of art
- John D. Graham (1886–1961), American painter
- Jon Dee Graham (born 1959), guitarist and songwriter from Austin, Texas
- John Galbraith Graham (1921–2013), British crossword compiler under the name "Araucaria"
- John J. Graham (1923–1994), American graphic artist
- John R. Graham (composer), American film composer
- John Graham (producer) (fl. 2000s), British music producer

== Military ==
- John de Graham (died 1298), Scottish soldier
- Sir John de Graham (died 1337), Scottish noble
- John Graham, Earl of Menteith (died 1346), Scottish soldier
- John Graham (pirate) (fl. 1683–1686), English pirate active off New England
- John Graham (British Army officer, born 1778) (1778–1821), founder of Grahamstown, South Africa
- John Graham (British Army officer, born 1923) (1923–2012)
- John Graham of Duchray (1600–1700), Scottish landowner and soldier

== Politics ==
=== United Kingdom ===
- John Graham, 4th Earl of Menteith (c.1529–c.1565), Scottish nobleman
- John Graham, 6th Earl of Menteith (c.1571–c.1598), Scottish nobleman
- John Graham, 3rd Earl of Montrose (1548–1608), Scottish peer
- John Graham, 4th Earl of Montrose (died 1626), Scottish peer
- John Graham, 1st Viscount Dundee (1648–1689), Scottish nobleman and soldier
- John Graham (died 1755), Scottish politician, MP for Stirlingshire 1722–27
- John Graham (Irish republican) (1915–1997), Irish republican
- Sir John Graham, 4th Baronet (1926–2019), British diplomat who was ambassador to Iraq, Iran and NATO
- John Graham (loyalist) (born c. 1945), Ulster loyalist figure

=== United States ===
- John Graham (diplomat) (1774–1820), American acting Secretary of State
- John Graham (New Hampshire politician), New Hampshire state representative
- John Graham (Ohio politician) (1802–1851), American politician from Ohio
- John A. Graham (1911–1979), Illinois state senator
- John H. Graham (1835–1895), U.S. Representative from New York
- John Stephens Graham (1905–1976), attorney and political appointee

=== Elsewhere ===
- John Graham (New Zealand politician) (1843–1926), New Zealand politician
- John Graham (Manitoba politician) (1864–1951), politician in Manitoba, Canada
- John Graham (Australian politician), member of the New South Wales Legislative Council
- John Graham (Nunavut politician), politician in Nunavut, Canada

== Religion ==
- John Graham (clergyman) (1774–1844), champion of Protestantism in Ireland
- John Graham (bishop) (1794–1865), bishop of Chester, 1845–1865
- John Anderson Graham (1861–1942), Scottish vicar and missionary
- John Joseph Graham (1913–2000), American prelate of the Roman Catholic Church
- John Graham of Balfunning (1778–1865), minister of the Church of Scotland and landowner

== Sports ==
=== Football ===
- Alex Graham (footballer) (1889–1972), sometimes identified as John Graham, Scottish footballer for Arsenal, Brentford, Scotland
- John Graham (forward) (1873–?), English footballer who played as a forward for Newton Heath (Manchester United)
- John Graham (full back) (1873–1925), English footballer for Millwall, Arsenal, Fulham
- John Graham (footballer, born 1926) (1926–2006), English footballer for Aston Villa, Wrexham, Rochdale, and Bradford City
- Johnny Graham (footballer, born 1857) (1857–1927), Scottish footballer for Preston North End in the 1880s
- Johnny Graham (Australian footballer) (1875–1946), Australian rules footballer
- Johnny Graham (footballer, born 1945) (1945–2018), Scottish footballer for Falkirk, Hibernian, Ayr United
- Johnny Graham (footballer, born 1947) (1947–2022), Scottish footballer for Dumbarton
- John R. Graham (footballer), English footballer for Newcastle United and Bradford City in the 1900s

=== Other sports ===
- John Graham Jr. (golfer) (1877–1915), Scottish amateur golfer
- John Graham (rugby union) (1935–2017), New Zealand player, administrator, and educator
- John Graham (long-distance runner) (born 1956), Scottish marathon runner
- John Graham (hurdler) (born 1965), Canadian track and field athlete
- John Graham (racing driver) (1966–2025), Northern Irish-born Canadian racing driver
- John Graham (cricketer) (born 1978), English cricketer

== Other ==
- John Graham, Lord Hallyards (c. 1530–1593), Scottish judge
- John Graham, Sr. (1873–1955), architect and founder of John Graham & Company
- John Graham, Jr. (architect) (1908–1991)
- John Graham (journalist) (1926–1974), British political journalist and editor
- John Graham (Canadian activist) (born 1955), First Nations and AIM activist who murdered Anna Mae Aquash
- John Graham (policy analyst) (born 1956)
- John Graham (economist) (born 1961), American economist and professor
- John Benjamin Graham (1814–1876), English settler and investor in South Australia who built "Graham's Castle"
- John Gilbert Graham (1932–1957), American mass murderer
- John Murray Graham (1809–1881), Scottish historian

== See also ==
- Jack Graham (disambiguation)
