= Judge Graham =

Judge Graham may refer to:

- Donald L. Graham (born 1948), United States federal judge
- James Graham Jenkins (1834–1921), United States federal judge
- James Graham, 2nd Marquess of Montrose (1631–1669), Scottish nobleman and judge
- James Graham, 3rd Duke of Montrose (1755–1836), Lord Justice General of Scotland
- James L. Graham (born 1939), United States federal judge
- Janis Graham Jack (born 1946), United States federal judge
- Mal Graham (born 1945), former basketball player and a judge on the Massachusetts Appeals Court
- Peter Graham (judge) (born 1940), retired Justice of the Federal Court of Australia
- Robert Graham (judge) (1744–1836), English judge
- Samuel C. Graham (1846–1923), Virginia lawyer and judge
- Samuel Jordan Graham (1859–1951), judge of the United States Court of Claims
- Thomas Graham (barrister) (1860–1940), South African judge
- Thomas Graham Robertson, Lord Robertson (1881–1944), 20th-century Scottish advocate, who became a Senator of the College of Justice
- Warner A. Graham (1884–1934), Vermont attorney and judge
- William Graham, 7th Earl of Menteith (1591–1661), 17th-century Scottish nobleman who held offices including Lord President of the Court of Session
- William J. Graham (1872–1937), judge of the United States Court of Customs Appeals

== See also ==
- Justice Graham (disambiguation)
- Graham (surname)
- Graham (disambiguation)
