= Graham Hill (disambiguation) =

Graham Hill (1929–1975) was a British racing driver.

Graham Hill or Graeme Hill may also refer to:

- Graham Hill (academic), Zimbabwean veterinary surgeon
- Graham Hill (judge) (1938–2005), Australian judge
- Graham Hill (theologian) (born 1969), Australian theologian
- Graeme Hill, New Zealander radio persona of Graeme Humphreys, former member of the Able Tasmans
- Graeme Hill, New Zealander sports presenter on the TV show SportsCafe
- Graeme Hill, Australian politician for Labor during 2002; see Electoral results for the district of Swan Hill
- Graeme Hill, Australian politician during 2009; see Electoral results for the district of Southport
- Graeme Hill, Australian mountain climber, who made the first ascent of the South West Pillar of Shivling in 1986 with Brigitte Muir
- Graeme Hill, British basketball player, MVP during the 1987–88 British Basketball League season
- Graeme Hill, British politician for the Green Party during the 2021 Hertfordshire County Council election and Mayor of Ware (2025-26)

== See also ==
- Grahams Hill, Narellan, New South Wales, Australia; a station in metro Sydney; see List of closed railway stations in Sydney
- Graham's Hill, Creswick, Shire of Hepburn, Victoria, Australia; see List of localities in Victoria
- Graham Hills (disambiguation)
- Mount Graham (disambiguation), including Graham Mountain
- Graham (given name)
- Hill (surname)
- Hill (disambiguation)
- Graham (disambiguation)
