= James Graham =

James Graham may refer to:

== Arts and entertainment ==
- James Gillespie Graham (1776–1855), Scottish architect
- James Graham (photographer) (1806–1869), took some of the earliest photographs of Palestine
- James Graham (artist) (born 1961), founding director of the Museum of Contemporary Art in Tucson, Arizona
- James Graham (playwright) (born 1982), British playwright
- James Graham (singer) (born 1996), singer and member of the band Stereo Kicks
- James Graham (actor) (born 2006), Filipino-American actor

== Baronets ==
- Sir James Graham, 1st Baronet, of Kirkstall (1753–1825), Tory MP for Cockermouth, Wigtown Burghs and Carlisle
- Sir James Graham, 1st Baronet, of Netherby (1761–1824), MP for Ripon 1798–1807
- Sir James Graham, 2nd Baronet (1792–1861), First Lord of the Admiralty, MP 1812–61 for Hull, St Ives, Carlisle, Cumberland, East Cumberland, Pembroke, Dorchester, Ripon

== Military ==
- James Grahme or Graham (1649–1730), English army officer, courtier, politician and Jacobite
- James Graham (British Army soldier) (1791–1845), British soldier commended for bravery at the Battle of Waterloo
- James A. Graham (Medal of Honor) (1940–1967), United States Marine and Medal of Honor recipient
- James Duncan Graham (1799–1865), member of the Corps of Topographical Engineers

== Noblemen ==
- James Graham, 1st Marquess of Montrose (1612–1650), Scottish nobleman and soldier
- James Graham, 2nd Marquess of Montrose (1631–1669), Scottish nobleman and judge
- James Graham, 3rd Marquess of Montrose (1657–1684)
- James Graham, 1st Duke of Montrose (1682–1742), Scottish aristocratic statesman (was 4th Marquess)
- James Graham, 3rd Duke of Montrose (1755–1836), British statesman
- James Graham, 4th Duke of Montrose (1799–1874), British politician - Member for Cambridge
- James Graham, 6th Duke of Montrose (1878–1954), Scottish nobleman, politician and engineer
- James Graham, 7th Duke of Montrose (1907–1992), signatory to the Rhodesian Declaration of Independence
- James Graham, 8th Duke of Montrose (born 1935), member of the House of Lords
- James Graham, Marquess of Graham (born 1973), Scottish aristocrat

== Politicians and political activists ==
- James Graham (speaker) (1650–1701), merchant, lawyer and speaker of the New York General Assembly
- James Graham (North Carolina politician) (1793–1851), United States representative from North Carolina
- James Graham (Brooklyn) (1847–1917), American hatter and politician from New York
- James H. Graham (1812–1881), United States representative from New York
- James Graham (Victorian politician) (1819–1898), merchant and member of the Victorian Legislative Council
- James McMahon Graham (1852–1945), United States representative from Illinois
- Sir James Graham (physician) (1856–1913), Scottish-Australian physician and New South Wales politician
- James D. Graham (1873–1951), American socialist politician from Montana
- James Callan Graham (1914–2006), member of the Texas House of Representatives
- James Allen Graham (1921–2003), North Carolina teacher and politician
- James B. Graham (1923-2007), Kentucky auditor of public accounts
- Jim Graham (1945–2017), American politician from Washington D.C.

== Science and medicine ==
- James Graham (sexologist) (1745–1794), Scottish pioneer in sex therapy
- James Methuen Graham (1882–1962), Scottish surgeon
- James David Provins Graham (1914–1989), Scottish physician, pharmacologist and academic author
- Wes Graham (James Wesley Graham, 1932–1999), Canadian computer scientist
- James A. Graham (psychologist), American child psychologist
- James R. Graham, Irish astrophysicist, as of 1992 at the University of California

== Sportsmen ==
- James Graham (baseball) (1865-1935), 19th-century baseball player
- James Graham (footballer) (dates unknown), association footballer
- James Graham (sport shooter) (1870–1950), American sports shooter
- Jimmy Graham (cricketer) (1875–1942), Scottish cricketer
- James Graham (rugby union) (1884–1941), New Zealand rugby union player
- Jim Graham (footballer) (1892–1957), Australian rules footballer
- James Graham (cricketer) (1906–1942), Irish cricketer
- Jimmy Graham (footballer) (born 1969), Scottish association footballer
- James Graham (rugby league) (born 1985), English rugby league footballer
- Jimmy Graham (born 1986) American football player

- Jim Graham (pole vaulter), winner of the 1956 and 1959 NCAA DI outdoor pole vault championships

== Others ==
- James L. Graham (born 1939), U.S. federal judge
- James Martin Graham (1956–1997), American Roman Catholic priest, and director of the International Christian AIDS Network
- James Lorimer Graham Jr. (1835–1876), American consul in Florence
- Jamie Graham, chief constable of Vancouver

== See also ==
- James Graham Fair (1831–1894), United States senator
- James Graeme (disambiguation)
- Graham (surname)
