= Graham Hills =

Graham Hills may refer to:

== Places ==
- Graham Hills, the Grahams, a range of hills in Scotland; see List of Graham mountains
- Graham Hills, Mount Pleasant, New York State, USA; a former hamlet, see Graham station (New York Central Railroad)
- Graham Hills County Park, Westchester, State of New York, USA; on the Saw Mill River
- Graham Hills Building, John Anderson Campus, Strathclyde University, Glasgow, Scotland, UK; named after the chemist

== People ==
- Sir Graham John Hills FRSE (1926–2014), a Scottish physical chemist at the University of Strathclyde
- Graham Hills, visual effects artist, who in 2011 was Emmy nominated for "Fire and Blood" (Game of Thrones)
- Graham Hills, Australian politician, who ran in 2001 for One Nation for the Division of Corangamite; see Results of the 2001 Australian federal election in Victoria
- Graham Hills, UK politician, who won a seat for the Conservatives in Nuthall East & Strelley during the 2023 Broxtowe Borough Council election
- Robert Graham Hills, a UK politician; candidate for the Liberal Democrats in the 2010 Barking and Dagenham London Borough Council election

== See also ==
- Grahams Hill, Narellan, New South Wales, Australia; a station in metro Sydney; see List of closed railway stations in Sydney
- Graham's Hill, Creswick, Shire of Hepburn, Victoria, Australia; see List of localities in Victoria
- Graham Hill (disambiguation)
- Mount Graham (disambiguation), including Graham Mountain
- Graham (given name)
- Hills (surname)
- Hills (disambiguation)
- Graham (disambiguation)
