= George Graham (disambiguation) =

George Graham (born 1944) is a Scottish former football player and manager.

George Graham may also refer to:

== Politics ==
- Lord George Graham (1715–1747), naval officer, MP for Stirlingshire
- George Graham (Northern Ireland politician) (1945–2012), Northern Ireland Democratic Unionist Party politician
- George Graham (Scottish MP) (1730–1801), MP for Clackmannanshire and Kinross-shire, Lord Lieutenant of Kinross-shire
- George Graham (soldier) (1772–1830), Virginia lawyer and legislator, interim U.S. Secretary of War and commissioner of the General Land Office
- George Graham (New Zealand politician) (1812–1901), New Zealand politician
- George Graham (Victorian politician) (1838–1922), member of the Victorian Legislative Assembly
- George Graham (New South Wales politician) (fl. 1861), member of the New South Wales Legislative Council
- George Scott Graham (1850–1931), U.S. Representative from Pennsylvania
- George Perry Graham (1859–1943), Canadian MP from Ontario
- George G. Graham (born 1931), former Chairman of the South Carolina Republican Party
- George J. Graham Jr. (1938–2006), American political theorist
- George Graham (North Carolina politician) (1949–2022), member of the North Carolina General Assembly
- George Graham (Georgia politician), member of the Atlanta Board of Aldermen

== Sports ==
- George Graham (Australian footballer) (1903–1983), Australian rules footballer
- George Graham (mountaineer), first ascent of Aoraki / Mount Cook
- George Graham (rugby) (born 1966), rugby player for Scotland and Newcastle Falcons
- George Graham (soccer, born 1902) (1902–1966), Irish-Canadian soccer player

== Others ==
- George Graham (bishop) (died 1643), Scottish bishop
- George Graham (clockmaker) (1673–1751), English clockmaker, geophysicist, and inventor
- George Graham (ethnographer) (1874–1952), New Zealand accountant, lawyer and ethnographer
- George Graham (monologist) (1866–1903), American monologist, patent medicine salesman, and recording artist
- George Graham (physician) (1882–1971), English physician and physiologist
- George Graham (Registrar General), Registrar General of England and Wales (1842–1880)
- George Farquhar Graham (1789–1867), Scottish musicologist
- George Mason Graham (1807–1891), first chairman of the board of trustees of the Louisiana State Seminary of Learning, forerunner of Louisiana State University
- George Rex Graham (1813–1894), founder of Graham's Magazine in Philadelphia
- George Augustus Graham, British soldier, historian and dog breeder
