= Bill Graham =

Bill Graham or Billy Graham may refer to:

== Arts and entertainment ==
- Billy Graham (comics) (1935–1997), American comic book artist
- Bill Graham (director) (1926–2013), American television and film director
- Bill Graham (musician) (1918–1975), American jazz saxophonist
- Bill Graham (promoter) (1931–1991), American music promoter
- Bill Graham, character in Ann Carver's Profession

== Sports ==
- Bill Graham (baseball) (1937–2006), American baseball player
- Billy Graham (American boxer) (1922–1992), American boxer
- Billy Graham (New Zealand boxer) (born 1947/1948), winner of four New Zealand titles at light welterweight
- Bill Graham (Canadian football) (1935–2020), Canadian football player for the Hamilton Tiger-Cats
- "Superstar" Billy Graham (1943–2023), American former professional wrestler
- Billy Graham (born 1955), trainer of boxer Ricky Hatton
- Billy Graham (footballer) (1914–1996), English footballer

== Others ==
- Billy Graham (1918–2018), American evangelist
- Bill Graham (Australian politician) (1919–1995), Australian politician
- Bill Graham (author) (1951–1996), Irish rock journalist and author
- Bill Graham (Canadian politician) (1939–2022), Canadian politician, former foreign minister, former Leader of the Opposition and former interim leader of the Liberal Party of Canada

== See also ==
- William Graham (disambiguation)
