= Michael Graham =

Michael, Mickey or Mike Graham may refer to:

== Sportsmen ==
- Mike Graham (American football) (1923–2003), American football player for Cincinnati and Los Angeles
- Michael Graham (basketball) (born 1963), American basketball player
- Michael Graham (footballer) (born 1952), Australian rules footballer
- Mike Graham (footballer) (born 1959), English footballer who played for Bolton Wanderers and Swindon Town
- Mickey Graham (born 1975), Irish Gaelic footballer and manager
- Mike Graham (wrestler) (1951–2012), American professional wrestler
- Shayne Graham (Michael Shayne Graham, born 1977), American football player
- Todd Graham (Michael Todd Graham, born 1964), American football coach

== Others ==
- Michael Graham (scientist), scientist, author and conservationist
- Michael Graham (director) (born 1982), American director
- Michael Graham (radio personality), American talk radio host and columnist
- Michael Graham (singer) (born 1972), Irish singer, member of Boyzone
- Michael H. Graham (born 1943), American legal scholar in the field of evidence
- Michael J. Graham, American Jesuit and educator
- Mike Graham (journalist) (born 1960), British journalist and presenter for Talkradio
- Michael Graham (Neighbours), a fictional character in the Australian soap opera Neighbours

== See also ==
- Graham (surname)
