= Ian Graham (disambiguation) =

Ian Graham (1923–2017) was a British Mayanist.

Ian Graham may also refer to:

- Ian Graham (footballer, born 1943), Australian rules footballer for Collingwood
- Ian Graham (footballer, born 1940), Australian rules footballer for Essendon
- Ian A. Graham (born 1963), professor of biology at the University of York
- Ian Graham (cricketer) (born 1968), English cricketer
- Ian Graham (rugby union)
- Ian Graham (snooker player)

== See also ==
- Ian Maxtone-Graham (born 1959), American television producer and writer
- Graham (surname)
