= Graeme (surname) =

Graeme is an English-language surname. It is a habitational name, derived from Grantham in Lincolnshire, England. Also, as a Scottish surname, it can derive from Gaelic.

== People ==
This list only contains people with the surname 'Graeme'. For a list of people with the given names 'Graham' or 'Graeme' see.

- Alexander Graeme (1741–1818), Scottish naval officer
- David Graeme (1716–1797) Scottish soldier, diplomat and courtier, MP for Perthshire 1764–73
- David Graeme (died 1726) MP for Perthshire 1724–26
- Elizabeth Graeme Ferguson (1737–1801), American poet
- James Graeme, British actor and singer
- James Graeme (poet), (1749–1772), Scottish poet
- Peter Graeme (1921–2012), English oboist
- Richard Graeme (fl. 1600), English soldier

== See also ==
- Graham
- Grahame
