= General Graham =

General Graham may refer to:

- Sir Andrew Graham, 5th Baronet (born 1956), British Army lieutenant general
- Charles K. Graham (1824–1889), Union Army brigadier general
- Charles Passmore Graham (1927–2021), U.S. Army lieutenant general
- Daniel O. Graham (1925–1995), U.S. Army lieutenant general
- Douglas Graham (British Army officer) (1893–1971), British Army major general
- Edward Graham (British Army officer) (1859−1951), British Army major general
- Fortescue Graham (1794–1880), Royal Marines general
- Frederick Graham (British Army officer) (1908–1988), British Army major general
- Gerald Graham (1831–1899), British Army lieutenant general
- Gordon M. Graham (1918–2008), U.S. Air Force lieutenant general
- Henry V. Graham (1916–1999), U.S. Army National Guard general
- Howard Graham (Canadian Army officer) (1898–1986), Canadian Army lieutenant general
- James Graham, 1st Marquess of Montrose (1612–1650), captain general of Scotland
- John Graham (British Army officer, born 1923) (1923–2012), British Army major general
- John Graham, 1st Viscount Dundee (c. 1648–1689), Kingdom of Scotland major general
- Miles Graham (1895–1976), British Army major general
- Peter Graham (British Army officer) (born 1937), British Army lieutenant general
- Samuel Graham (British Army officer) (1756–1831), British Army lieutenant general
- Stuart Clarence Graham (1920–1996), Australian Army major general
- Thomas Graham, 1st Baron Lynedoch (1748–1843), British Army general
- Wallace H. Graham (1910–1996), U.S. Air Force major general
- William Graham (British Army officer) (died 1747), British Army brigadier general
- William Montrose Graham (1834–1916), U.S. Army major general

== See also ==
- Attorney General Graham (disambiguation)
