= Ted Graham =

Ted Graham may refer to:

- Ted Graham (ice hockey) (1904–1979), Canadian ice hockey defenceman
- Ted Graham, Baron Graham of Edmonton (1925–2020), British Labour Co-operative politician

== See also ==
- Edward Graham (disambiguation)
