= Peter Graham =

Peter Graham may refer to:

== Arts and entertainment ==
- Peter Graham (artist) (1836–1921), British painter
- Peter Graham (composer) (born 1958), British composer
- Peter Benjamin Graham (1925–1987), Australian visual artist and art theorist
- Peter Sebastian Graham (born 1970), Australian artist
- Peter Graham (writer) (1939–2020), British writer, restaurant critic

== Politics ==
- Peter Graham (Conservative MPP) (1827–1877), British-born Ontario farmer and political figure, MPP for Frontenac
- Peter Graham (Liberal MPP) (1821–1900), English-born Ontario farmer and political figure, MPP for Lambton East
- Peter Graham (Manitoba politician)

== Sports ==
- Peter Graham (cricketer, born 1920) (1920–2000), Indian-born British cricketer
- Peter Graham (cricketer, born 1954) (1954–2015), British cricketer
- Peter Graham (footballer) (born 1947), British footballer
- Peter Graham (fighter) (born 1975), Australian kickboxer, boxer and mixed martial artist
- Peter Graham (rugby league), Australian rugby league footballer of the 1990s

== Other people ==
- Sir Peter Graham (barrister) (1934–2019), British lawyer and parliamentary draftsman
- Peter Graham (judge) (born 1940), justice of the Federal Court of Australia
- Peter Graham (New Zealand mountaineer) (1881–1961), who together with Henrik Sillem made the first ascent of the West Ridge of Mount Cook
- Peter Graham (British Army officer) (1937–2024), British Army lieutenant-general
- Peter Graham (Marxist) (1945–1971), Irish republican and Marxist
