= David Graeme =

David Graeme may refer to:

- David Graeme (1716–1797) Scottish soldier, diplomat and courtier, MP for Perthshire 1764–73
- David Graeme (died 1726) United Kingdom MP for Perthshire 1724–26

== See also ==
- Graeme (surname)
