= Henry Graham =

Henry Graham may refer to:

- Henry Graham (RAF officer) (1910–1987)
- Henry Graham (missionary) (1806–?), missionary to Sierra Leone
- Henry Grey Graham (1874–1959), Scottish Catholic clergyman and author
- Henry Graham (cricketer) (1914–1982), English cricketer
- Henry Graham (of Levens) (c. 1676–1707), English gentleman, heir to a Westmorland estate, and member of parliament
- Henry Graham (parliamentary clerk) (1842–1930), Scottish public servant
- Henry Graham (poet) (1930–2019), British poet
- Henry V. Graham (1916–1999), American army general

== See also ==
- Harry Graham (disambiguation)
