= Joseph Graham =

Joseph Graham may refer to:

- Joe Graham (1944–2021), Irish writer and historian
- Joseph Graham (North Carolina soldier) (1759–1836), American Revolutionary War militia officer, politician, and wealthy ironmonger from North Carolina
- Joseph Graham (footballer) (1889–1968), English footballer
