= Sir James Graham, 1st Baronet =

Sir James Graham, 1st Baronet may refer to:

- Sir James Graham, 1st Baronet, of Kirkstall (1753–1825), Tory MP for Cockermouth, Wigtown Burghs and Carlisle
- Sir James Graham, 1st Baronet, of Netherby (1761–1824), MP for Ripon 1798-1807

== See also ==
- James Graham (disambiguation)
