= Justice Graham =

Justice Graham may refer to:

- Patrick Graham (judge) (1906–1993), justice of the High Court of England and Wales
- Peter Graham (judge) (born 1940), justice of the Federal Court of Australia
- Warner A. Graham (1884–1934), justice of the Vermont Supreme Court

== See also ==
- Judge Graham (disambiguation)
