= Andrew Graham =

Andrew or Andy Graham may refer to:

== Sports ==
- Leth Graham (Andrew Letham Graham, 1893–1944), Canadian ice hockey player
- Andrew Graham (Australian footballer) (born 1963), Australian rules footballer
- Andrew Graham (baseball) (born 1982), Australian baseball player
- Andy Graham (born 1983), Scottish footballer

== Others ==
- Andrew Graham (bishop of Dunblane), Bishop of Dunblane between 1573/1575 and 1603
- Andrew Graham (naturalist) (1730s–1815), Scottish scientist
- Andrew Graham (astronomer) (1815–1908), Irish astronomer
- Andrew J. Graham (stenographer) (1830–1894), American inventor of a system of shorthand
- Andrew Graham (politician) (1843–1926), New Zealand politician
- Andrew J. Graham (banker) (d. 1916), American banker
- Alec Graham (Andrew Alexander Kenny Graham, 1929–2021), English Anglican bishop
- Andrew Graham (economist) (born 1942), English academic
- Sir Andrew Graham, 5th Baronet (born 1956), British general

== See also ==
- Andy Grahame (born 1957), speedway rider
- Andrew Graham-Yooll (1944–2019), author
- Andrew Graham-Dixon (born 1960), British art historian
