= Richard Graham =

Richard, Rich, Richie, Ricky or Dick Graham may refer to:

== Law and politics ==
- Sir Richard Graham, 1st Baronet (1583–1654), English Member of Parliament for Carlisle
- Richard Graham, 1st Viscount Preston (1648–1695), British politician and diplomat
- Richard Graham (politician) (born 1958), British MP for Gloucester

== Sports ==
- Dick Graham (1922–2013), English footballer
- Richard Graham (rugby union, born 1889), Irish rugby union player
- Ricky Graham (born 1946), Australian rules footballer
- Richard Graham (rugby union, born 1972), Australian rugby union coach
- Richard Graham (footballer, born 1974), English football defender, primarily for Oldham Athletic
- Richard Graham (footballer, born 1979), Northern Ireland footballer

== Others ==
- Richie Graham (1555–1606), English border raider
- Richard Graeme (fl. 1600s), Anglo-Irish soldier, often known by this spelling
- Richard Robert Graham (1735–1816), British apothecary to King George I and George II
- Richard Dalziel Graham (died 1920), British educator, author, artist and printer
- Richard Alton Graham (1920–2007), American civic leader; founding officer of the National Organization for Women
- Richard Graham (historian) (born 1934), Brazilian-American historian
- Richard Graham (actor) (born 1960), English actor
- Richard H. Graham (fl. 2000s–2010s), American Evangelical Lutheran bishop
