= Charles Graham =

Charles Graham may refer to:

== Politicians ==
- Charles Graham (Western Australian politician) (1867–1938), Australian politician
- Charles Graham (Queensland politician) (1839–1886), member of the Queensland Legislative Assembly
- Charles Christie Graham (1835–1915), New Zealand politician
- Charles Graham (American politician) (born 1951), member of the North Carolina General Assembly
- Charles P. Graham (1839–1904), adjutant general of Connecticut
- Charles Everett Graham (1844–1921), physician and politician in Quebec
- Chuck Graham (1965–2020), Missouri state senator

== Others ==
- Charles Graham (artist) (1852–1911), American artist
- Charles Graham (rugby union) (1876–1944), rugby union player who represented Australia
- Charles Graham (bishop) (1834–1912), British clergyman
- Charles E. Graham (1865–1948), American film actor
- Charles K. Graham (1824–1889), sailor in the antebellum United States Navy, attorney, and brigadier
- Charles Passmore Graham (1927–2021), lieutenant general in the United States Army
- Charlie Graham (1878–1948), baseball catcher, manager and team owner

== See also ==
- Sir Charles Percy Graham-Montgomery, 6th Baronet Stanhope (1855–1930), English aristocrat
