= Mount Graham (disambiguation) =

Mount Graham or Graham Mountain may refer to:

== Mountains ==
- Mount Graham, a mountain in Graham County, Arizona, United States
- Mount Graham (Antarctica)
- Mount Graham (New Zealand), a mountain in the West Coast Region of New Zealand
- Graham Mountain (New York), a mountain in the Catskills

== Other ==
- Mount Graham National Forest
- Mount Graham International Observatory
- Mount Graham red squirrel
- Mount Graham High School

== See also ==
- Graeme S. Mount (born 1939), Canadian historian
- Graham (disambiguation)
- Graham Hill (disambiguation)
- Graham Hills (disambiguation)
