= Hills (surname) =

Hills is a surname. Like the related surname Hill (surname), Hills refers to someone living 'at the hill'. Notable people and characters with the name include:

== People ==
- Adam Hills (born 1970), Australian comedian
- Adam Hills (politician) (1880–1941), English Labour Party politician
- Alex Hills (born 1974), English composer
- Anna Althea Hills (1882–1930), American painter
- Anne Hills (born 1953), American folk singer-songwriter
- Arnold Hills (1857–1927), English businessman, sportsman, philanthropist and promoter of vegetarianism
- Arthur Hills (1930–2021), American golf course designer
- Barry Hills (1937–2025), British thoroughbred horse trainer
- Ben Hills (1942–2018), Australian freelance journalist and author
- Beverly Hills (actress) (born 1966), British actress
- Brian Hills (born 1959), Canadian ice hockey coach and former player
- Chester Hills (1798–1854), American architect and author
- Christopher Hills (1926–1997), English-born author, philosopher, and scientist
- Dene Hills (born 1970), Australian cricketer
- Denis Hills (1913–2004), British teacher, traveller, author and adventurer
- Edward F. Hills (1912–1981), American Presbyterian scholar
- Edwin Sherbon Hills (1906–1986), Australian geologist
- Ernie Hills (1930–2020), New-Zealand born rugby union player who represented Australia
- Floyd Nathaniel Hills (born 1982), American record producer, professionally known as Danja
- George Hills (1816–1895), Canadian Anglican bishop
- George Hills (historian) (1918–2002), British journalist and historian
- George Edwin Hills (1905–1978), English-born painter, contractor and political figure in British Columbia
- Gerald Hills, American politician and educator
- Gillian Hills (born 1944), British actress and singer
- Graham John Hills (1926–2014), British scientist and educator
- Harry Hills (1886–?), English cricketer
- Hilda Hills (1913–2003), Australian cricketer
- Jack G. Hills (born 1943), American astronomer
- Joe Hills (1897–1969), English cricketer and umpire
- Joe Hills (American football) (born 1987), American football player
- John Hills (disambiguation), multiple people
- Johnny Hills (1934–2021), English professional footballer
- Julia Hills (born 1957), British actress
- Laura Coombs Hills (1859–1952), American painter
- Lawrence D. Hills (1911–1990), British horticulturalist, journalist, and writer
- Lee Hills (footballer) (born 1990), English footballer
- Lee Hills (journalist) (1906–2000), editor and publisher
- Michael Hills (disambiguation), multiple people
- Pat Hills (1917–1992), Australian politician
- Paul Hills (born 1972), former Australian rules footballer
- Peter Youngblood Hills (born 1978), Anglo-American actor
- Richard Hills (disambiguation), multiple people
- Robert Hills (disambiguation), multiple people
- Rod Hills (1946–2003), English politician
- Roderick M. Hills (1931–2014), chairman of the U.S. Securities and Exchange Commission
- Stephen Hills (1771–1844), American architect
- Tad Hills (born 1963), American children's book author and illustrator
- Thomas Hills (1796–1866), English cricketer
- Tony Hills (American football) (born 1984), American football player
- Wendy Hills (born 1954), Australian former cricketer
- Wes Hills (born 1995), American football player

== Characters ==
- Heather Hills, a character in Jeff Kinney's book series, Diary of a Wimpy Kid
- Kathy Beale, a fictional character in the British soap opera EastEnders
- Ted Hills, a fictional character from the BBC soap opera EastEnders
- Tony Hills, a fictional character from the BBC soap opera EastEnders

== See also ==
- Hill (surname)
- Hills (disambiguation)
