= Graham Township =

Graham Township may refer to one of the following places:

== In Canada ==
- Graham Township, Sudbury District, Ontario

== In the United States ==
- Graham Township, Jefferson County, Indiana
- Graham Township, Johnson County, Iowa
- Graham Township, Graham County, Kansas
- Graham Township, Carter County, Oklahoma
- Graham Township, Benton County, Minnesota
  - and also Graham Lakes Township, Nobles County, Minnesota
- Township 6, Graham, Alamance County, North Carolina
- Graham Township, Clearfield County, Pennsylvania

== See also ==
- Graham (disambiguation)
