= Graham =

Graham or Graeme may refer to:

== People ==
- Clan Graham, a Scottish clan
- Graeme (surname), an English-language surname (includes a list of people with the surname)
- Graham (given name), an English-language given name (includes a list of people with the given name)
- Graham (surname), an English-language surname (includes a list of people with the surname)
- Graham (musician) (born 1979), Burmese singer
- Graham baronets

== Fictional characters ==
- Graham, in the ova Shamanic Princess
- Graham Aker, in the anime Gundam 00
- Project Graham, what a human would look like to survive a car crash
- Graham, the head of the royal in bridge incidents King's Quest series of video games

== Places ==
=== Canada ===
- Graham, Sudbury District, Ontario
- Graham Island, part of the Charlotte Island group in British Columbia
- Graham Island (Nunavut), Arctic island in Nunavut

=== United States ===
- Graham, Alabama
- Graham, Arizona
- Graham, Florida
- Graham, Georgia
- Graham, Kentucky
- Graham, Missouri
- Graham, North Carolina
- Graham, Oklahoma
- Graham, Texas
- Graham, Washington

=== Elsewhere ===
- Graham, South Australia, a township that was merged into the town of Burra in 1940
- Graham Island (Mediterranean Sea), British name for a submerged volcanic island in the Mediterranean Sea
- Graham Land, Antarctica

== Food ==
- Graham flour, a type of flour similar to whole wheat flour
  - Graham cracker, a baked good made from Graham flour
- Graham (mango), a named mango cultivar originating in Trinidad

== Science and technology ==
- Graham's number, the largest number that has ever been seriously used in a mathematical proof
- Graham (satellite), NASA satellite
- Graham escapement, a type of clockwork escapement used in pendulum clocks
- Graham scan, a method of computing a convex hull

== Other uses ==
- Graham number, a figure used in value investing
- Graham Street light rail station, Melbourne, Australia (previously named Graham)
- Graham technique, a modern dance style
- Graham-Paige, automobile makers in Detroit, US, between 1928 and 1940
- Graham's, a producer of port wine
- List of Grahams (mountains), a class of mountain in Scotland between 2,000–2,500 ft (609.6–762.0 m) in height and a prominence of 150 m (492 ft 2 in) or more

== See also ==
- Gram
- Gramm (disambiguation)
- Graham County (disambiguation)
- Graham Township (disambiguation)
- Graham Hill (disambiguation), including Graham's Hill
- Graham Hills (disambiguation)
- Mount Graham (disambiguation), including Graham Mountain
