= James Graeme (disambiguation) =

James Graeme is a singer and actor.

James Graeme is also the name of:

- James Graeme (poet)

== See also ==
- James Graham (disambiguation)
