= Attorney General Graham =

Attorney General Graham may refer to:

- Doug Graham (New Zealand politician) (born 1942), Attorney-General of New Zealand
- Jan Graham (fl. 1970s–2000s), Attorney General of Utah
- Malcolm D. Graham (1827–1878), Attorney General of Texas

== See also ==
- General Graham (disambiguation)
