= John Murray Graham =

Scottish historian

John Murray Graham (1809–1881) was a Scottish historian.

== Life ==
He was eldest son of Andrew Murray (1782–1847) of Murrayshall, Perthshire, who served as sheriff of Aberdeenshire, and his wife Janet, daughter of Oliver Thomson of Leckiebank. He was born in Aberdeenshire 15 October 1809, and educated at Edinburgh University, where he graduated M.A. in 1828. He became an advocate in 1831.

Murray Graham was a relation of Thomas Graham, 1st Baron Lynedoch (died 1843), to a part of whose estates he succeeded in 1859 on the death of his heir Robert Graham of Balgowan, and whose surname he adopted.

He lived at Murrayshall near Perth.

He died 18 January 1881, having married on 22 November 1853 Robina, daughter of Thomas Hamilton. His heir was his nephew Henry Stewart Murray-Graham.

== Works ==
Graham wrote:

- A Month's Tour in Spain in the Spring of 1866, 1867.
- Memoir of General Lord Lynedoch, 1869; 2nd edition, with additions and portraits, 1877; compiled from family papers.
- An Historical View of Literature and Art in Great Britain from the accession of Queen Victoria, 1871; 2nd edit. 1872.
- Annals and Correspondence of the Viscount and the first and second Earls of Stair, London, 1875.

== Notes ==
Attribution

This article incorporates text from a publication now in the public domain: Stephen, Leslie; Lee, Sidney, eds. (1890). "Graham, John Murray". Dictionary of National Biography. Vol. 22. London: Smith, Elder & Co.
