= Thomas Graham =

Thomas Graham may refer to:

== Politicians and diplomats ==
- Thomas Graham, 1st Baron Lynedoch (1748–1843), British politician and soldier
- Thomas Graham Jr. (diplomat) (1933–2026), nuclear expert and senior U.S. diplomat
- Sir Thomas Graham (barrister) (1860–1940), South African lawyer and politician
- Ted Graham, Baron Graham of Edmonton (Thomas Edward Graham, 1925–2020), British Labour Co-operative politician
- Tommy Graham (Scottish politician) (1943–2015), Scottish Member of Parliament for Renfrew West and Inverclyde
- Thomas Graham (Canadian politician) (1914–1988), Canadian Member of Provincial Parliament for York Centre
- Thomas Jefferson Graham (1832–1902), American politician in Wisconsin and Montana

== Scientists and medics ==
- Thomas Graham (chemist) (1805–1869), Scottish chemist
- Thomas Graham (apothecary) (1666–1733), apothecary to King George I and George II

== Sportspeople ==
- Thomas Graham (footballer, born 1887) (1887–1967), English football centre forward
- Tommy Graham (footballer, born 1905) (1905–1983), English international footballer
- Tommy Graham (footballer, born 1955), Scottish football forward
- Tommy Graham (Australian rules footballer) (1886–1933), Australian rules footballer
- Tom Graham (gridiron football, born 1910) (1910–2002), American football player
- Tom Graham (linebacker) (1950–2017), American football player
- Thomas Graham Jr. (American football) (born 1999), American football player
- Tom Graham (rugby union) (1866–1945), Wales national rugby player
- Tom Graham (volleyball) (born 1956), Canadian volleyball player

== Other ==
- Thomas N. Graham (1837–1911), Union Army soldier in the American Civil War and Medal of Honor recipient
- Tommy Graham, editor of History Ireland magazine
- Tom Graham, a pseudonym of Sinclair Lewis

== See also ==
- Thomas Grahame (1840–1907), Ontario political figure
