= Patrick Graham =

Patrick Graham may refer to:

- Patrick Graham (bishop) (died 1478), Bishop of Brechin and Bishop of St Andrews, first Archbishop of St. Andrews
- Patrick Graham (VC) (1837–1875), Irish recipient of the Victoria Cross
- Patrick Graham (boxer) (born 1969), Canadian heavyweight boxer
- Patrick Graham (journalist) (born 1965), Canadian journalist and screenwriter
- Patrick Graham (judge) (1906–1993), English judge
- Pat Graham (photographer), American photographer
- Patrick Graham (American football) (born 1979), American football coach
- Pat Graham (ice hockey) (1961–2026), Canadian ice hockey player
- Patrick Graham (Royal Navy officer) (1915–1980), British naval officer
- Patrick Graham (governor) (died 1755), colonial governor of Georgia

== See also ==
- Patrick de Graham, 13th-century Scottish noble
