= Hills (disambiguation) =

Hills generally refers to a series of raised landforms.

Hills may also refer to:

== Places ==
=== Australia ===
- Hills District, New South Wales

=== United States ===
- Hills, Iowa
- Hills, Minnesota
- Hills, Ohio
- Hills Fork, a stream in Ohio

== Music ==
- "Hills", a song by Frank La Forge
- "Hills", a song by Kim Petras

== Other uses ==
- Hills (store), an American department store chain
- Hills (surname)
- Hills Centre, an entertainment centre in Castle Hill, New South Wales
- Hills Christian Life Centre (now Hillsong Church), commonly nicknamed Hills
- Hills cloud a circumstellar disc, interior to the Oort cloud
- Hills Industries, an Australian diversified manufacturer, best known for the Hills Hoist clothesline
- Hill's Pet Nutrition, an American pet food company
- Hills Supermarkets, an American market chain

== See also ==
- The Hills (disambiguation)
- Hill (disambiguation)
