= Theodore Schneider =

Evangelical Lutheran Church in America bishop

Theodore F. Schneider was the second bishop of the Metropolitan Washington, D.C. Synod of the Evangelical Lutheran Church in America. He was elected bishop by the 1995 Synod Assembly, and was reelected by the 2001 Synod Assembly. His term ended in 2007.

Schneider was ordained a minister in 1959 by the Virginia Synod of the United Lutheran Church in America. Prior to assuming the office of bishop, he was senior pastor at Saint Luke Lutheran Church in Silver Spring, Maryland, beginning in 1986. Schneider was awarded the Medalist Award by Roanoke College.

Preceded by E. Harold Jansen	Bishop of the Metropolitan Washington, D.C. Synod; July 31, 1995 – September 1, 2007	Succeeded by Richard H. Graham
