= Leonard Graham (disambiguation) =

Leonard Graham (1901–1962) was an English cricketer and association footballer.

Len or Leonard Graham may also refer to:

- Len Graham (singer) (born 1944), Irish folk singer and song collector
- Len Graham (footballer) (1925–2007), Northern Ireland footballer
- Leonard Graham (EastEnders), a character on the BBC soap opera EastEnders

== See also ==
- Graham Leonard (1921–2010), British priest
