= Grahame Buckley =

Australian rugby league footballer

Personal information
- Full name: Grahame Arthur Buckley
- Born: 4 June 1957; Sydney, Australia
- Died: 3 March 2016 (aged 58); Lake Cathie, New South Wales

Playing information
- Position: Lock
Club
Years	Team	Pld	T	G	FG	P
1978–84	St. George Dragons	59	6	0	0	19
1986	Illawarra Steelers	1	0	0	0	0
	Total	60	6	0	0	19
- Source: Whiticker/Hudson

Grahame Arthur Buckley (1957–2016) was an Australian rugby league footballer who played in the 1970s and 1980s.

== Playing career ==
Buckley was graded at the St. George Dragons from Peakhurst J.R.L.F.C in 1977 and made his first-grade debut for the St George Dragons in Round 10 of the 1978 NSWRFL season. Buckley made 59 first grade appearances in total over, a span of seven seasons, which included being involved in the club's 1979 premiership campaign and was a much loved Dragons player of his era. He was a crowd favourite at Kogarah Jubilee Oval, and is remembered as a man who played above his weight.

He later joined the Illawarra Steelers where he played one game during the 1986 season.

== Death ==
After retiring, he later moved to Wauchope, New South Wales. Grahame Buckley was very well respected in the Wauchope rugby league and surf club community. He suffered a fatal heart attack doing surf-boat training on Lake Cathie, New South Wales, on 3 March 2016.

== Accolades ==
His surf club, the Wauchope-Bonny Hills Surf Club have named their surf boat rower of the year in his memory.
