= Thomas N. Graham =

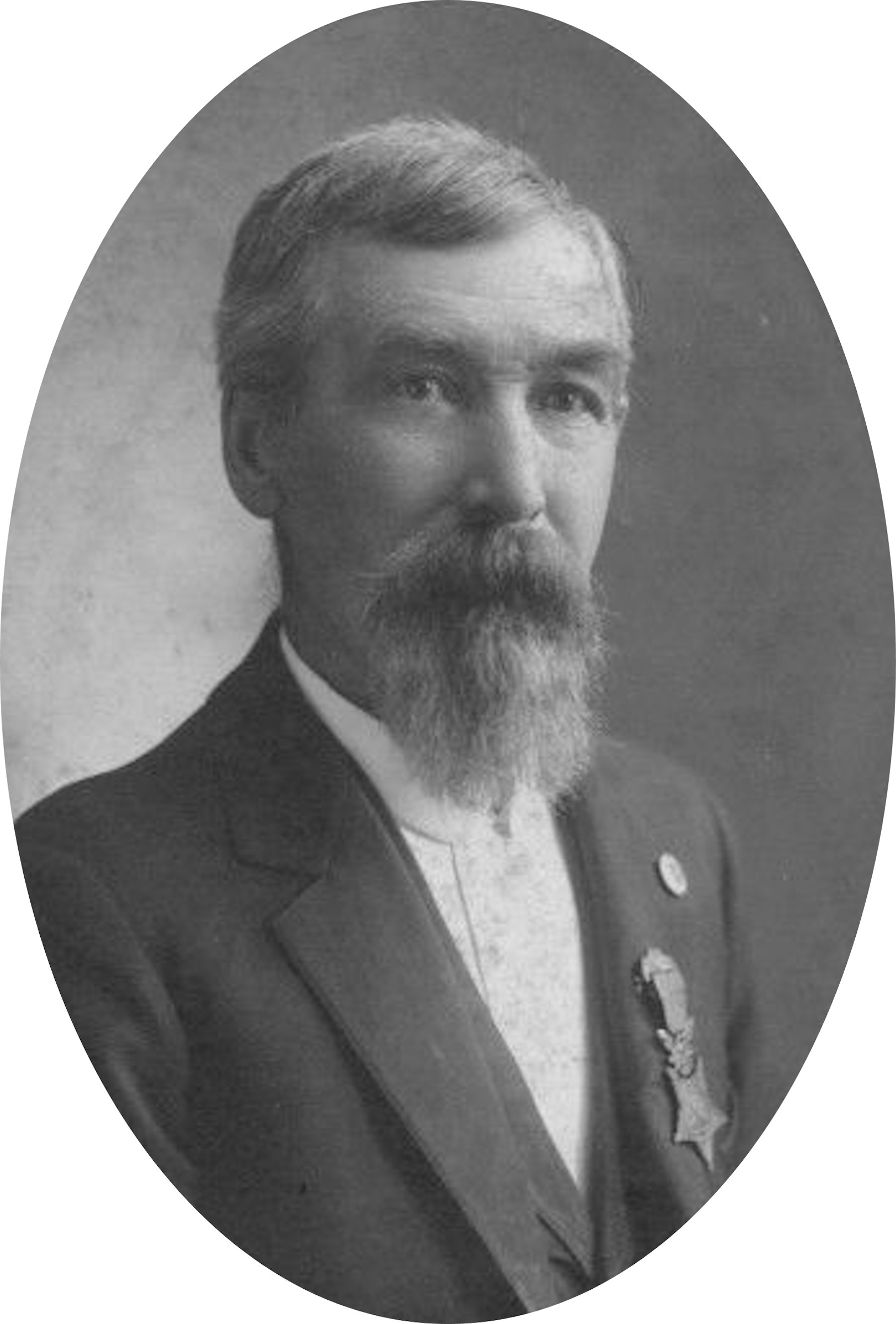
- Medal of Honor winner Thomas N Graham
- Born: September 16, 1837
- Died: February 4, 1911 (aged 73)
- Burial place: Lawrence, Kansas, US
- Military career
- Allegiance: United States
- Branch: Union Army
- Service years: 1861 - 1864
- Rank: Captain
- Units: Company G, 15th Regiment Indiana Volunteer Infantry
- Conflicts: American Civil War; Battle of Missionary Ridge
- Awards: Medal of Honor

Thomas N. Graham (September 16, 1837 - February 4, 1911) was a Union Army soldier in the American Civil War who received the U.S. military's highest decoration, the Medal of Honor.

Graham was born on September 16, 1837, and entered service at Westville, Indiana. He was awarded the Medal of Honor, for extraordinary heroism shown on November 25, 1863, while serving as a Second Lieutenant with Company G, 15th Indiana Infantry Regiment, at the Battle of Missionary Ridge. His Medal of Honor was issued on February 15, 1897.

He died at the age of 73, on February 4, 1911, and was buried at the Oak Hill Cemetery in Lawrence, Kansas.

== Medal of Honor citation ==
The President of the United States of America, in the name of Congress, takes pleasure in presenting the Medal of Honor to Second Lieutenant Thomas N. Graham, United States Army, for extraordinary heroism on 25 November 1863, while serving with Company G, 15th Indiana Infantry, in action at Missionary Ridge, Tennessee. Second Lieutenant Graham seized the colors from the Color Bearer, who had been wounded, and, exposed to a terrible fire, carried them forward, planting them on the enemy's breastworks.
