= Michael Graham (director) =

American artist, writer and director (born 1982)

Michael Patrick Graham (born February 18, 1982, in Los Angeles, California) is an American artist, writer and director. From 1990 until 1995, Michael sang as the main soloist in the Paulist Boy's Choir, a world-renowned choir at St. Paul the Apostle School in Los Angeles. This introduced him to the film industry at an early age after singing on soundtracks for John Tesh's Romantic Christmas, Batman, Edward Scissorhand and was chosen as the voice of Simba in The Lion King, but had to drop out of the project after coming down with strep throat a week before production. This early exposure to film led him to Lynch Productions at the age of 15, where he worked on Nickelodeon kid shows as production assistant and eventually writer's assistant. Michael graduated with honors from USC School of Film and Production in 2000. Since graduation, Michael has directed commercials, including Macy's swimwear; music videos for Tsar, Jonathan Wilson and is working with TeePee Records to direct videos for five of its bands. He recently started pre-production on his first feature film. Michael is also an artist and has been commissioned by various companies and organizations for his work.

AntiParticle
The Boy Choir & Soloist Directory
The Medusa Virus
Natural Rhapsody
YouTube
