= Charles Everett Graham =

Canadian physician and politician

Charles Everett Graham (1844–1921) was a physician and politician in Quebec. He was a member of the Hull council from 1876 to 1895, and served as mayor in 1878–1879 and in 1895–1896.

The son of Duncan Graham and Anna Maria Everett, he was born November 2, 1844, in Kingston, Canada West, and moved to Ottawa with his family in early 1845. Graham studied medicine at McGill University and then worked as an assistant to an Ottawa doctor until 1866, when he opened his own office in Hull. He married Florence Mildred Wright on June 16, 1868, in Hull, Quebec, and had two sons and two daughters. Graham died January 13, 1921, in Hull.
