= Jack Graham =

Jack Graham may refer to:

== Sportspeople ==
- Jack Graham (Australian footballer, born 1916) (1916–1984), Australian rules footballer for South Melbourne
- Jack Graham (Australian footballer, born 1878) (1878–1907), Australian rules footballer for Melbourne
- Jack Graham (Australian footballer, born 1998), Australian rules footballer for Richmond
- Jack Graham (footballer, born 1868) (1868–1932), English footballer
- Jack Graham (footballer, born 1873) (1873–1925), English footballer
- Jack Graham (baseball) (1916–1998), Major League Baseball player

== Others ==
- Jack Gilbert Graham (1932–1957), mass murderer
- Jack Graham (pastor) (born 1950), Baptist pastor and former president of the Southern Baptist Convention
- Jack Graham (politician) (born 1952), American politician and businessman

== See also ==
- John Graham (disambiguation)
