= Graham Hill (judge) =

Australian judge

Hon Donald Graham Hill

Judge of the Federal Court of Australia
- In office 1 February 1989 – 24 August 2005

Personal details
- Born: 1 November 1938 Sydney, Australia
- Died: 24 August 2005 (aged 66) Sydney, Australia
- Spouse: Ute Hill
- Children: Katrina and Peter Hill

Donald Graham Hill (1 November 1938 – 24 August 2005) was a judge that served on the Federal Court of Australia. He was prominent in the field of taxation law.

== Education ==
Hill was educated at Fort Street Boys High School before attending the University of Sydney, where he completed degrees in arts and law, graduating with first-class honours and receiving the university medal in law. He later undertook postgraduate study at Harvard University as a Ford International Fellow and Fulbright Scholar, obtaining a Master of Laws in 1963, and subsequently spent a year at the London School of Economics.

== Career ==
After returning to Australia, he entered legal practice, became a partner in major law firms, and was admitted to the New South Wales Bar in 1976. He was appointed Queen’s Counsel in 1984.

He combined legal practice with an academic career, serving for nearly four decades as Challis Lecturer in Taxation Law at the University of Sydney. In the early 1980s, he worked with Murray Gleeson, at the request of federal treasurer John Howard, on drafting Part IVA of the Income Tax Assessment Act 1936. This general anti-avoidance provision remains in force. He also contributed to international programs aimed at developing tax and legal systems in Thailand and China.

Hill held positions within the Taxation Institute of Australia, the Australian Tax Research Foundation, and the Law Council of Australia. He was also involved in judicial education and court administration, particularly through his work on committees of the Federal Court concerned with training and information technology.

== Death ==
Hill died on 24 August 2005 at his home in Glebe, Sydney, aged 66. The circumstances of his death were unclear. Contemporary reports indicated that the likely cause was asphyxiation, though no definitive public explanation was immediately provided, giving rise to speculation at the time.
