= Jimmy Graham (cricketer) =

Scottish cricketer (1875–1942)

Personal information
- Full name: James Graham
- Born: 2 March 1875; Kilmarnock, Ayrshire, Scotland
- Died: 24 January 1942 (aged 66); Clackmannan, Clackmannanshire, Scotland
- Batting: Right-handed
- Bowling: Leg break googly

Domestic team information
- Years: Team
- 1924: Scotland

Career statistics
Competition	First-class
Matches	1
Runs scored	3
Batting average	3.00
100s/50s	–/–
Top score	3*
Balls bowled	132
Wickets	1
Bowling average	89.00
5 wickets in innings	–
10 wickets in match	–
Best bowling	1/89
Catches/stumpings	1/–
- Source: Cricinfo, 3 November 2022

James Graham (2 March 1875 – 24 January 1942) was a Scottish first-class cricketer.

Graham was born at Kilmarnock in March 1875. A club cricketer for Kilmarnock, Graham made a single appearance in first-class cricket for Scotland against the touring South Africans at Glasgow in 1924. Playing in the Scottish side as a leg break googly bowler, he took one wicket in the match, that of South African captain Mick Commaille. Batting twice in the match from the tail, he ended the Scotland first innings unbeaten without scoring, while in their second innings he was dismissed without scoring by Cec Dixon. Graham was the victim of a burglary in March 1931, where a substantial amount of money and gold coins were stolen. He died at Clackmannan in January 1942.
