= John Graham (history painter) =

English painter (1720–1775)

- Occupation: Painter

John Graham (fl. 1720–1775) was an English history painter.

== Biography ==
Graham was an Englishman by birth. He went at an early age to Holland, and settled at the Hague, where he studied painting under Pieter Terwesten and Arnold Houbraken. His name appears in the lists of the Guild of St. Luke at the Hague from 1718 to 1742. He also visited Rome to study art there, and on his return visited Paris and London, though he made the Hague his home. He lived with his sister in a house, which he adorned with ceiling and other paintings from his own hand. In 1775, it appears that Graham and his sister removed to London, where he probably died at a very advanced age.
