= Harry Graham =

Harry Graham may refer to:

- Harry Graham (cricketer) (1870–1911), Australian cricketer and footballer
- Harry Graham (poet) (1874–1936), English journalist, poet and lyricist for musicals and operettas
- Harry Graham (Manitoba politician) (1921–2006), Canadian politician
- Harry Graham (footballer) (1887–1940), Scottish footballer
- Harry Graham (priest) (1909–1979), English Anglican priest
- Harry Graham (MP) (1850–1933), British Member of Parliament for St Pancras West, 1892–1906

== See also ==
- Henry Graham (disambiguation)
