= John Graham of Balfunning =

John Graham of Balfunning (1778–1865) was a 19th century minister of the Church of Scotland and landowner, who served as Moderator of the General Assembly in 1850, the highest position in the Scottish church.

== Life ==
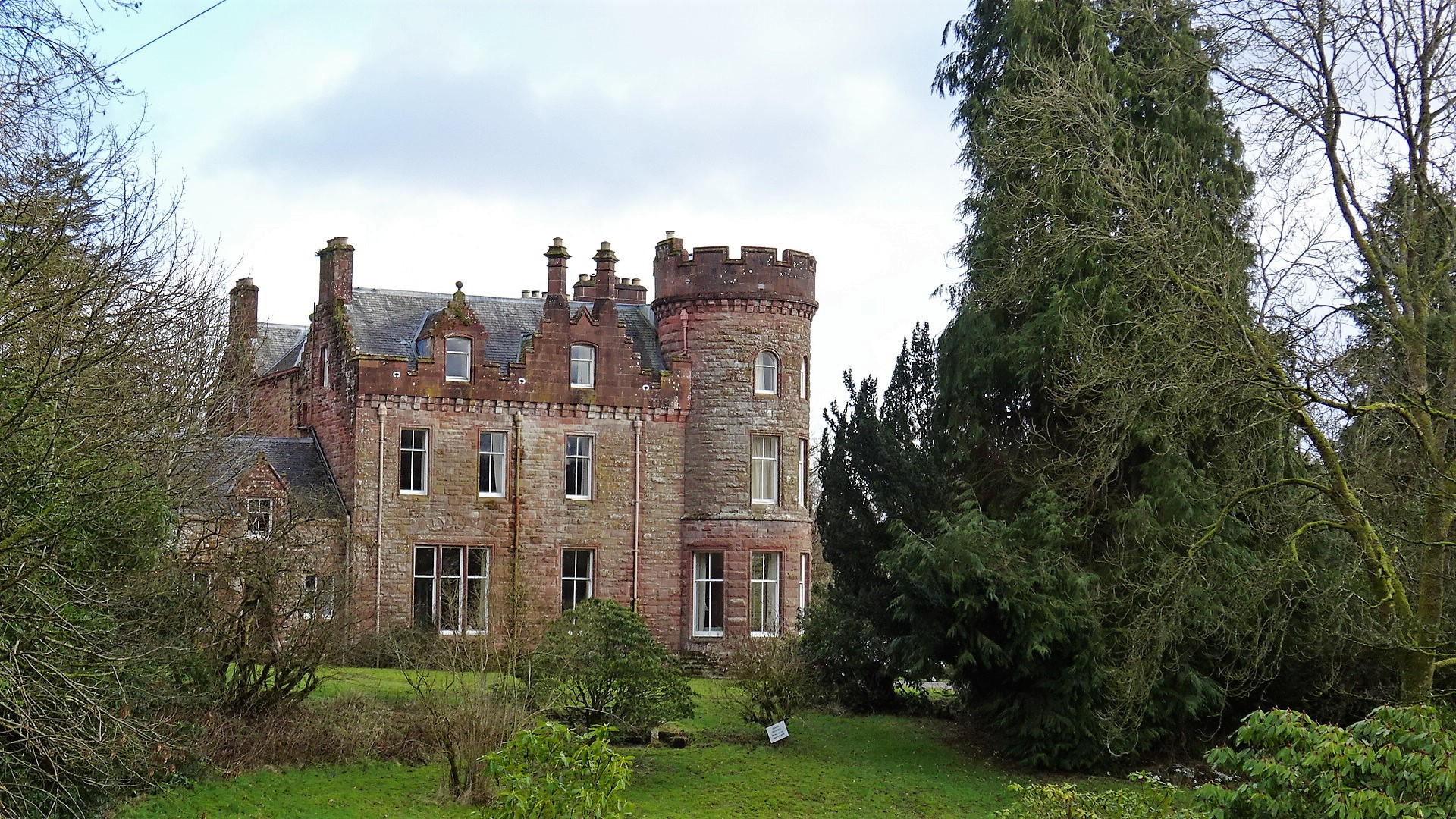
Balfunning House

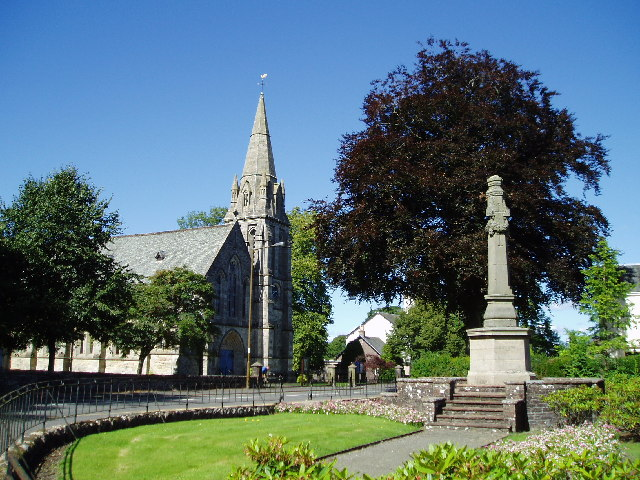
Killearn church

He was born on 1 May 1778 the second son of Thomas Graham a landowner and farmer and his wife Mary McEwan. He was raised at Balfunning House near Balfron. He studied at Glasgow University and was licensed by the Presbytery of Perth in September 1801.

In September 1805 he was ordained as minister of Fintry. In January 1822, under patronage of James, Duke of Montrose he was presented to the congregation of Killearn. He formally translated to this new role in May 1822, replacing his uncle, Rev James Graham (1736-1821). In 1825 Glasgow University awarded him an honorary Doctor of Divinity.

He inherited Balfunning House and estate on the death of his father.

In 1850 he succeeded the Rev Alexander Lockhart Simpson as Moderator of the General Assembly of the Church of Scotland the highest position in the Scottish Church. He was succeeded in turn by Rev John Macleod.

He died on 12 January 1865. Balfunning passed to his only son, Thomas.

== Family ==
In November 1805 he married Elizabeth Bannerman daughter of David Bannerman of Letham Hill. They had several children:

- Jane Graham (1806-1838) married Rev James Campbell of Petershill
- Margaret (b.1808)
- Elizabeth (1812-1836)
- Captain Thomas Graham of Balfunning (1817-1894) heir to Balfunning House
