= Alexander Graham =

Alexander Graham can refer to:

- Alexander Graham (politician) (1816-1895), American politician
- Alexander Graham (Lord Mayor) (born 1938), a former Lord Mayor of London
- Alexander Graham (swimmer) (born 1995), Australian swimmer
- Alexander H. Graham (1890-1977), American attorney and politician
- Alexander C. Graham (1881-1957), mountaineer and guide in New Zealand
- Alex Graham (footballer) (1889-1972), Scottish footballer, played for Hurlford, Hamilton Academical, Larkhall Utd, Woolwich Arsenal, Vale of Leven, Brentford, Folkestone
- Alex Graham (footballer, born 1912), Scottish footballer, played for Burnbank Amateurs, Vale of Clyde, West Ham Utd, Albion Rovers, Cowdenbeath, Stenhousemuir, Morton, Rochdale, Bradford Park Avenue, Halifax Town
