= Stephen Graham (disambiguation) =

Stephen Graham (born 1973) is an English film and television actor.

Stephen Graham may also refer to:

- Stephen Victor Graham (1874–1955), Governor of American Samoa, 1927–1929
- Stephen Graham (author) (1884–1975), British travel writer and novelist
- Stephen Graham Jones (born 1972), Native American author of experimental horror crime and science fiction
- Stephen Graham (basketball) (born 1982), American NBA basketball player
- Steve Graham (born 1962), Australian Paralympic winter sport coach
- Stephen Graham (academic), scholar of cities and urban life, author of Cities Under Siege: The New Military Urbanism
