= Sam Graham (footballer, born 1874) =

Scottish footballer

Personal information
- Full name: Sam Graham
- Date of birth: 7 April 1874
- Place of birth: Edinburgh, Scotland
- Position: Centre half

Senior career*
Years	Team	Apps	(Gls)
1894–1895	Morton		
1895–1896	Bury	9	(0)
1896	Morton		
Total		9	(0)
- * Club domestic league appearances and goals

Sam Graham (7 April 1874–unknown) was a Scottish footballer who played in the Football League for Bury.
