= Henry Graham (cricketer) =

English cricketer

Henry Canning Graham (31 May 1914 – 6 March 1982) was an English cricketer active from 1936 to 1937 who played for Leicestershire. He was born in Belfast and died in Shrewsbury. He appeared in 23 first-class matches as a righthanded batsman who scored 589 runs with a highest score of 75.
