= Donald Graham =

Donald Graham may refer to:

- Donald Graham (politician) (1848–1944), politician in British Columbia, Canada
- Donald W. Graham (1883–1976), Canadian-American fine artist and art instructor
- Don Graham (developer) (1914–2010), developer of the Ala Moana Center
- Don Graham (rugby league) (1917–1997), Australian rugby league player
- Donald William Graham (1917–2010), fighter pilot and United States Air Force general
- Don Graham (music promoter) (born 1935), former executive at A&M Records; co-founder of Blue Thumb Records
- Don Graham (racing driver) (1943–2016), American racing driver
- Donald E. Graham (born 1945), chairman of the Washington Post Company, 2000–present, publisher of Washington Post
- Donald L. Graham (born 1948), American judge
- Don Graham (footballer), (born 1953), English footballer, see List of Bury F.C. players (1–24 appearances)
- Don Graham (American football) (born 1964), former American football linebacker
- Donald Jupurrula Graham (c. 1920–1989), Warumungu man from the Northern Territory of Australia
