= Richard H. Graham =

American Lutheran bishop

Richard H. Graham is the third bishop of the Metropolitan Washington, D.C. Synod of the Evangelical Lutheran Church in America. He was elected bishop on June 8, 2007, by the 2007 Synod Assembly. He was re-elected Bishop on June 21, 2013, by the 2013 Synod Assembly. He retired effective September 1, 2019.

Preceded by Theodore Schneider	Bishop of the Metropolitan Washington, D.C. Synod; September 1, 2007–August 31, 2019	Succeeded by Leila M. Ortiz
