= George J. Graham Jr. =

American political theorist

George Jackson Graham Jr. (1938 – November 30, 2006) was a political theorist who trained generations of political scientists at Vanderbilt University. He taught at Vanderbilt for more than 40 years. He served as chair of the political science department from 1988 to 1992 and as an associate dean in the College of Arts and Sciences from 1986 to 1988 and again from 1997 to 2000.

== Life ==
George J. Graham Jr., was born in Dayton, Ohio in 1938 and graduated from Wilbur Wright High School in 1956. He received his B.A. from Wabash College in 1960 and his Ph.D. from Indiana University in 1965. He was a member of the faculty of the political science faculty at Vanderbilt from 1963 until his death on November 30, 2006. He taught courses in political theory for undergraduates and in political theory, philosophy of social science, and democratic theory for graduate students, with graduate students always being his primary focus. Graham was a central figure in the Vanderbilt graduate program for many years; by the late 1980s and early 1990s, he was arguably the faculty member most closely connected to the graduate students. During that time, he served as adviser and/or friend to many graduate students who went on to successful careers.

== Work ==
Graham's academic production was hampered by his perfectionism and a number of chronic health problems. His writings address a number of important topics in the field of political science, including the place of political theory (and, more narrowly, conceptual analysis) in political science, the role of consensus in democratic theory and practice, and political rhetoric. At the time of his death, his unfinished works included books on consensus and on the political thought of Founding Father James Wilson.

Graham was very active in the political science profession and played a role in the creation of the Foundations of Political Theory section of the American Political Science Association. He was also a founding member of the Committee on Conceptual and Terminological Analysis (COCTA), a research committee of the International Political Science Association.

Graham co-edited two books: The Post-Behavioral Era: Perspectives on Political Science (1972, co-editor George W. Carey), and Founding Principles of American Government: Two Hundred Years of Democracy on Trial (1977, co-editor Scarlett G. Graham).

== Fellowships ==
In 1995-96, he was awarded a Fulbright and spent the year as Distinguished John Marshall Chair at the Budapest University of Economic Sciences (now Corvinus University of Budapest), in Hungary. He was also a recipient of a Guggenheim fellowship. Throughout his career he was active in a number of National Endowment for the Humanities-funded programs, including conferences on narrative and Greek culture.
