= Frank Graham =

Frank Graham may refer to:

- Frank D. Graham (1875–1965), American writer of Audel guides
- Frank Porter Graham (1886–1972), Democratic Senator from North Carolina, 1949–1950, and president of the University of North Carolina at Chapel Hill
- Frank Dunstone Graham (1890–1949), Canadian-born American professor of economics at Princeton University, co-founder of the Mont Pelerin Society
- Frank Graham (writer) (1893–1965), American sportswriter and biographer
- Frank Graham (voice actor) (1914–1950), American voice actor and radio announcer
- Frank L. Graham, Canadian biologist
