= James A. Graham (psychologist) =

American developmental psychologist

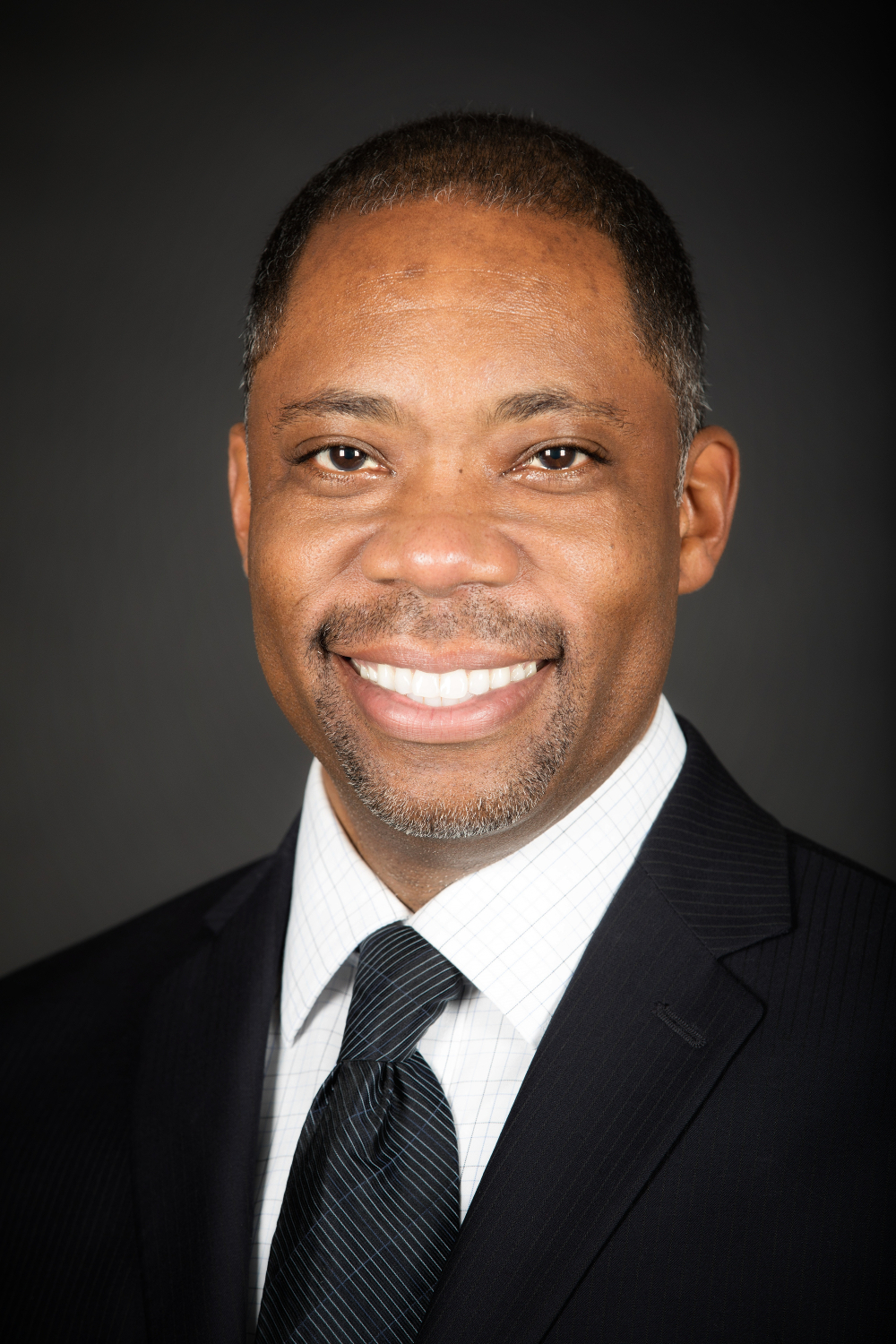
- Born: 1970 (age 55–56)
- Education: School for Creative and Performing Arts; Miami University (BA); University of Memphis (MS, PhD)
- Occupation: Professor of Psychology

James A. Graham is a professor at The College of New Jersey (TCNJ), in the Department of Psychology. He is a developmental psychologist whose work explores the social-cognitive aspects of children's relationships.

== Education ==
Graham received a Bachelor of Arts (B.A.) degree at Miami University in Oxford, OH with a major in psychology in 1992. In 1994, he completed a Master of Science (M.S.) in psychology from University of Memphis. In 1997, he was also awarded a Doctor of Philosophy (Ph.D.) degree in experimental psychology (developmental specialization) from University of Memphis.

== Research ==
His scholarship focuses on the social-cognitive aspects of peer relationships among school children (K–5) from both molar (peer group) and molecular (dyads) perspectives.

Graham examines populations that are typically understudied, conceptually limited, and methodologically constrained (i.e., African-American children, and children of incarcerated parents) in social science research. His research aims to fill these voids by engaging researchers and students across a variety of fields in critical discourse about the existing work on the topic, and by attempting to present a more balanced discussion of the challenges and resilience in the lives of these groups of children. His scholarship attempts to look beyond a deficit view of child development to a holistic account of the historical, cultural, economic, and social factors that influence developmental outcomes. A second branch of his research centers on children's development of empathy and prosocial behavior with peer groups and friends across childhood. An additional focus of his work establishes developmental science in the context of community-engaged research partnerships.

He has published articles on the roles of race and gender in children's friendships, children's evaluations of social situations, children's relationships to media, and program evaluation. In 2007 and 2014, he co-authored a textbook with Yvette R. Harris, The African American Child: Development and Challenges. In 2009 and 2010, he co-authored two additional books: the textbook Developmental Science: An Introductory Approach (Kendall/Hunt Publishing Company) and the edited text Children of Incarcerated Parents: Theoretical, Developmental, and Clinical Issues (Springer Publishing Company).

== Teaching ==
At TCNJ, Graham teaches courses in child development, research methods, and development across the lifespan. In addition, he teaches developmental seminars in children's social and personality development, ethnic and racial diversity among US children; cross-cultural child development; and children and the media. For the past decade, he has taught graduate Education and Psychology summer courses in Johannesburg, South Africa through TCNJ's Graduate Global Program.
