= George Graham (New South Wales politician) =

Australian politician

George Graham was an Australian politician.

He was one of Charles Cowper's 21 appointments to the New South Wales Legislative Council in May 1861, but never took his seat. Nothing further is known of him.
