= Luke Graham =

Luke Graham may refer to:

- Luke Graham (footballer, born 1986), footballer
- Luke Graham (footballer, born 2004), Scottish footballer
- Luke Graham (politician) (born 1985), British Conservative politician
- Luke Graham (wrestler) (1940–2006), American wrestler

== See also ==
- Lukas Graham, Danish pop band
