= Ronald Graham (disambiguation) =

Ronald Graham (1935–2020) was an American mathematician.

Ronald or Ron Graham may also refer to:

- Ronald William Graham (1870–1949), British diplomat
- Ronald Graham (RAF officer) (1896–1967), RAF Air Vice-Marshal
- Ronny Graham (1919–1999), American actor
- Ronald Graham (actor) (1911–1950), Scottish actor active in the United States
- Ron Graham (actor) (1926–2020), Australian actor
- Ron Graham (author), Canadian author and journalist
- Ron Graham (rugby union) (born 1946), Australian rugby union player

== See also ==
- Ranald Graham (1941–2010), Scottish writer
- Ron Grahame (born 1950), Canadian ice hockey player
