= Mark Graham =

Mark Graham may refer to:

- Mark Anthony Graham (1973–2006), Canadian Olympic athlete and casualty in the War in Afghanistan
- Mark Graham (rugby league) (born 1955), New Zealand rugby league footballer and coach
- Mark Graham (Australian footballer) (born 1973), former Australian rules footballer
- Mark Graham (footballer, born 1974), Northern Irish footballer for Cambridge United and Queens Park Rangers
- Mark Graham (diver), New Zealand diver
- Mark Graham (orchestrator), orchestrator and conductor
