= Andrew J. Graham (stenographer) =

American author and stenographer (1830–1894)

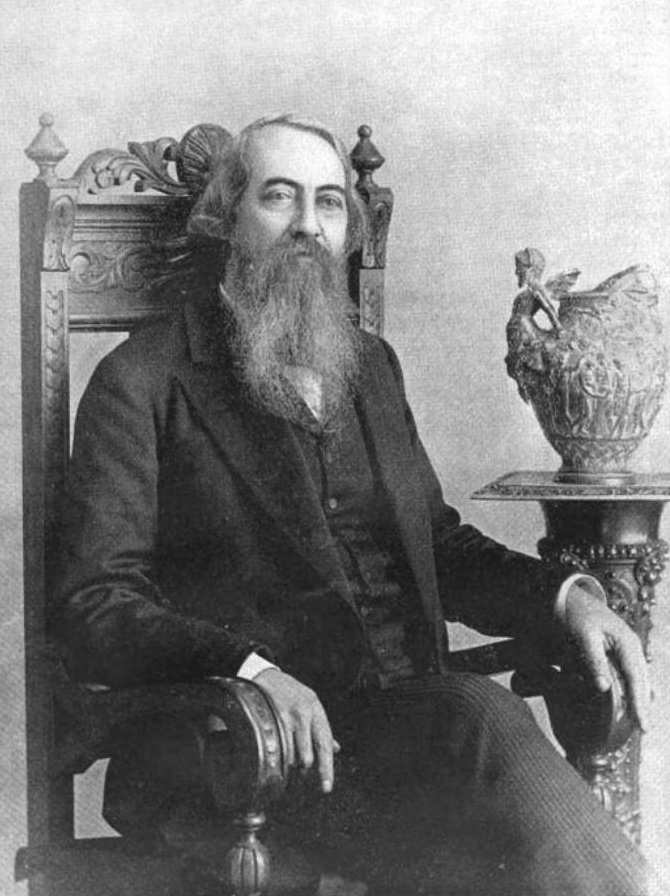
Portrait of Graham in his later years

Andrew J. Graham (1830–1894) was a 19th century American author and phonotypist (stenographer) who developed the eponymous Graham system for shorthand.

== Career ==
Graham was a phonotypist during the period between the emergence of Pitman's and Gregg's systems for shorthand. In 1854 he published a short-lived (only 9 issues) phonotypy journal called The Cosmotype, subtitled "devoted to that which will entertain usefully, instruct, and improve humanity", and several other monographs about phonography. The New York Public Library has a collection of phonographic shorthand notes Graham took of court cases, including Johnson v. Root patent lawsuit in the United States Court of Appeals for the First Circuit (in Boston).

Graham also founded the A.J. Graham Company (based in New York City and founded the publication The Student Journal.

=== Graham shorthand system ===
In 1857 Graham published his own Pitman-like "Graham's Brief Longhand" that saw wide adoption in the United States in the late 19th century. He published a translation of the New Testament. His method landed him in a 1864 copyright infringement lawsuit against Benjamin Pitman in Ohio. Graham died in 1894 and was buried in Montclair's Rosedale Cemetery; even as late as 1918 his company Andrew J. Graham & Co continued to market his method.

In his youth, Woodrow Wilson (a future president of the United States) had mastered the Graham system and even corresponded with Graham using it. Throughout his life, Wilson continued to develop and employ his own personal variant on the Graham system for personal writing, to the point that by the 1950s, when the Graham method had all but disappeared, Wilson scholars had trouble interpreting his shorthand. In 1960 an 84-year-old anachronistic shorthand expert Clifford Gehman managed to crack Wilson's shorthand, demonstrating on a translation of Wilson's acceptance speech for the 1912 Democratic Party presidential nomination.
