= Patricia Graham (pilot) =

- Born: 1928
- Died: 2016 (aged 87–88)
- Occupation: aviator

Patricia (Pat) Lyle Toole (née Graham) (November 1928 – April 2016), was an Australian aviator. She was one of the first female commercial pilots in Australia and the first female commercial pilot in Papua New Guinea.

== Life ==
Patricia Graham was the only daughter of Mr and Mrs Walter R. Graham of Coffs Harbour. She managed two hairdressing salons in Coffs Harbour before, at the age of nineteen, deciding to learn how to fly aircraft. She took lessons at the Coffs Harbour branch of the Newcastle Aero Club before moving to Tamworth to gain experience on a wider variety of aircraft.

In 1950, she became a founding member of the Australian Women Pilots' Association and in May 1951, Patricia Graham, Heather McDougall and Elizabeth Beeston piloted a plane together to Sydney in order to attend the association's first meeting.

Graham gained her Commercial B class licence in Australia on 29 October 1951, making her the third woman after Nancy Ellis and Helen Curkett to achieve a commercial pilot licence in the country. Graham undertook the written test in Newcastle with Heather McDougall.

Unable to find employment in Australia, in 1952 on the recommendation of her brother, Graham started working as a trainee pilot for Gibbes Sepik Airways in Papua New Guinea, a bush airline founded by Royal Australian Air Force ace Bobby Gibbes. The decision of Gibbes to hire her resulted in Graham becoming both the only female pilot in Papua New Guinea at the time and the first female commercial pilot in the country. The airline carried cargo and passengers around the country, and Graham initially flew Lockheed L-18s, later progressing to the role of captain on Noorduyn Norseman aircraft. She also flew Auster aircraft.

In 1953 Graham married Colin H. Toole, branch manager for Gibbes Sepik Airways. The couple settled in Wewak.

In later life, Graham regained her fixed wing licence at Archerfield Airport in Brisbane. In 2015 she was a special guest at the 65th anniversary celebrations of the Australian Women Pilots’ Association and Archerfield Airport’s first Brisbane Open House.

Graham died in April 2016.
