= Hills Fork =

Stream in Adams County, Ohio, U.S.

Coordinates: 38°47′37″N 83°38′45″W

Hills Fork is a stream in Adams County, Ohio.

Hills Fork was named for Thomas Hill, a local landowner.

== See also ==
- List of rivers of Ohio
