= Ian Graham (footballer, born 1940) =

Australian rules footballer

Personal information
- Full name: Ian Graham
- Born: 7 April 1940 (age 86)
- Height: 187 cm (6 ft 2 in)
- Weight: 80 kg (176 lb)

Playing career^{1}
Years	Club	Games (Goals)
1962–63	Essendon	5 (2)
1964–68	Coburg (VFA)	
- ^{1} Playing statistics correct to the end of 1963.

Ian Graham (born 7 April 1940) is a former Australian rules footballer who played with Essendon in the Victorian Football League (VFL).
