= Electoral results for the district of Southport =

Queensland, Australia, district election results

This is a list of electoral results for the electoral district of Southport in Queensland state elections.

== Members for Southport ==
First incarnation (1950–1960)
Member	Party	Term
Eric Gaven	Country	1950–1960
Second incarnation (1977–present)
Member	Party	Term
Peter White	Liberal	1977–1980
Doug Jennings	National	1980–1987
Mick Veivers	National	1987–2001
Peter Lawlor	Labor	2001–2012
Rob Molhoek	Liberal National	2012–present

== Election results ==
=== Elections in the 2020s ===
2024 Queensland state election: Southport
Party	Candidate	Votes	%	±%
Liberal National	Rob Molhoek	15,183	51.41	+5.81
Labor	Letitia Del Fabbro	8,128	27.52	−6.98
One Nation	David Vaughan	2,581	8.74	+2.84
Greens	Mitch McCausland	2,574	8.71	−0.29
Family First	Ruth Fea	1,069	3.62	+3.62
Total formal votes		29,535	94.85	
Informal votes		1,605	5.15	
Turnout		31,140	84.01	
Two-party-preferred result
Liberal National	Rob Molhoek	18,060	61.15	+5.75
Labor	Letitia Del Fabbro	11,475	38.85	−5.75
Liberal National hold		Swing	+5.75	

2020 Queensland state election: Southport
Party	Candidate	Votes	%	±%
Liberal National	Rob Molhoek	12,734	45.58	−1.50
Labor	Susie Gallagher	9,650	34.54	+4.87
Greens	Alan Quinn	2,532	9.06	−1.51
One Nation	Raphael Felix	1,631	5.84	+5.84
Independent	Brett Lambert	669	2.39	+2.39
United Australia	Maria Avdjieva	456	1.63	+1.63
Civil Liberties & Motorists	Jack Drake	267	0.96	−1.94
Total formal votes		27,939	95.66	+0.86
Informal votes		1,269	4.34	−0.86
Turnout		29,208	83.69	+1.33
Two-party-preferred result
Liberal National	Rob Molhoek	15,482	55.41	−1.83
Labor	Susie Gallagher	12,457	44.59	+1.83
Liberal National hold		Swing	−1.83	

=== Elections in the 2010s ===
2017 Queensland state election: Southport
Party	Candidate	Votes	%	±%
Liberal National	Rob Molhoek	12,499	47.1	−2.5
Labor	Judy Searle	7,877	29.7	−1.9
Greens	Michelle Le Plastrier	2,806	10.6	+2.4
Independent	Rick Flori	2,597	9.8	+9.8
Consumer Rights	Johan Joubert	769	2.9	+2.9
Total formal votes		26,548	94.8	−2.6
Informal votes		1,458	5.2	+2.6
Turnout		28,006	82.4	+1.1
Two-party-preferred result
Liberal National	Rob Molhoek	15,197	57.2	−0.6
Labor	Judy Searle	11,351	42.8	+0.6
Liberal National hold		Swing	−0.6	

2015 Queensland state election: Southport
Party	Candidate	Votes	%	±%
Liberal National	Rob Molhoek	13,287	45.92	−9.92
Labor	Rowan Holzberger	10,153	35.09	+6.66
Greens	Petrina Maizey	2,446	8.45	+1.76
Palmer United	Nicole Stanton	2,402	8.30	+8.30
Independent	Matthew Mackechnie	646	2.23	+0.64
Total formal votes		28,934	97.19	+0.12
Informal votes		836	2.81	−0.12
Turnout		29,770	85.30	−2.29
Two-party-preferred result
Liberal National	Rob Molhoek	14,133	53.24	−11.48
Labor	Rowan Holzberger	12,415	46.76	+11.48
Liberal National hold		Swing	−11.48	

2012 Queensland state election: Southport
Party	Candidate	Votes	%	±%
Liberal National	Rob Molhoek	14,890	55.84	+15.44
Labor	Peter Lawlor	7,580	28.43	−16.90
Katter's Australian	Kevin Brown	1,987	7.45	+7.45
Greens	Stephen Dalton	1,784	6.69	−0.64
Independent	Matthew Mackechnie	425	1.59	+1.59
Total formal votes		26,666	97.08	−0.38
Informal votes		803	2.92	+0.38
Turnout		27,469	87.59	−0.30
Two-party-preferred result
Liberal National	Rob Molhoek	15,645	64.72	+18.20
Labor	Peter Lawlor	8,529	35.28	−18.20
Liberal National gain from Labor		Swing	+18.20	

=== Elections in the 2000s ===
2009 Queensland state election: Southport
Party	Candidate	Votes	%	±%
Labor	Peter Lawlor	11,945	45.3	−7.1
Liberal National	Tania Wright	10,646	40.4	+2.3
Greens	Stephen Dalton	1,931	7.3	−2.2
DS4SEQ	Brian Morris	856	3.2	+3.2
Independent	Mark Tull	622	2.4	+2.4
Independent	Graeme Hill	354	1.3	+1.3
Total formal votes		26,354	97.2	
Informal votes		687	2.8	
Turnout		27,041	87.9	
Two-party-preferred result
Labor	Peter Lawlor	13,013	53.5	−4.6
Liberal National	Tania Wright	11,319	46.5	+4.6
Labor hold		Swing	−4.6	

2006 Queensland state election: Southport
Party	Candidate	Votes	%	±%
Labor	Peter Lawlor	13,063	53.3	−0.8
National	Bob Bennett	9,070	37.0	+1.7
Greens	Carla Brandon	2,364	9.7	+3.3
Total formal votes		24,497	97.5	−0.0
Informal votes		624	2.5	+0.0
Turnout		25,121	87.0	−1.6
Two-party-preferred result
Labor	Peter Lawlor	13,764	59.1	−0.9
National	Bob Bennett	9,522	40.9	+0.9
Labor hold		Swing	−0.9	

2004 Queensland state election: Southport
Party	Candidate	Votes	%	±%
Labor	Peter Lawlor	13,106	54.1	+3.2
National	Bob Bennett	8,546	35.3	+6.2
Greens	Ian Latto	1,549	6.4	+6.4
One Nation	Ron Williams	1,006	4.2	−11.0
Total formal votes		24,207	97.5	−0.1
Informal votes		614	2.5	+0.1
Turnout		24,821	88.6	−1.6
Two-party-preferred result
Labor	Peter Lawlor	13,720	60.0	−0.8
National	Bob Bennett	9,152	40.0	+0.8
Labor hold		Swing	−0.8	

2001 Queensland state election: Southport
Party	Candidate	Votes	%	±%
Labor	Peter Lawlor	11,245	50.9	+14.1
National	Mick Veivers	6,434	29.1	−8.8
One Nation	Lesley Millar	3,351	15.2	−6.5
Independent	Aaron Cortenbach	1,083	4.9	+4.9
Total formal votes		22,113	97.6	
Informal votes		551	2.4	
Turnout		22,664	90.2	
Two-party-preferred result
Labor	Peter Lawlor	11,986	60.8	+13.9
National	Mick Veivers	7,714	39.2	−13.9
Labor gain from National		Swing	+13.9	

=== Elections in the 1990s ===
1998 Queensland state election: Southport
Party	Candidate	Votes	%	±%
National	Mick Veivers	9,000	39.0	−12.3
Labor	Peter Lawlor	8,429	36.5	−3.9
One Nation	Jay Nauss	4,907	21.3	+21.3
Democrats	John Huta	735	3.2	−2.1
Total formal votes		23,071	98.3	+0.3
Informal votes		399	1.7	−0.3
Turnout		23,470	91.0	+1.0
Two-party-preferred result
National	Mick Veivers	11,127	53.8	−1.1
Labor	Peter Lawlor	9,573	46.2	+1.1
National hold		Swing	−1.1	

1995 Queensland state election: Southport
Party	Candidate	Votes	%	±%
National	Mick Veivers	10,960	51.3	+22.6
Labor	Peter Lawlor	8,630	40.4	−1.4
Democrats	Noel Payne	1,127	5.3	+5.3
Independent	Robyn Cooper	639	3.0	+3.0
Total formal votes		21,356	98.0	+0.1
Informal votes		442	2.0	−0.1
Turnout		21,798	90.0	
Two-party-preferred result
National	Mick Veivers	11,437	54.8	+2.5
Labor	Peter Lawlor	9,428	45.2	−2.5
National hold		Swing	+2.5	

1992 Queensland state election: Southport
Party	Candidate	Votes	%	±%
Labor	Peter Lawlor	8,381	41.8	+0.6
National	Mick Veivers	5,756	28.7	+1.5
Liberal	Tim Baker	5,017	25.0	−2.0
Independent	Gary Wachter	876	4.4	+4.4
Total formal votes		20,030	97.9	
Informal votes		429	2.1	
Turnout		20,459	90.4	
Two-party-preferred result
National	Mick Veivers	10,038	52.3	−1.0
Labor	Peter Lawlor	9,145	47.7	+1.0
National hold		Swing	−1.0	

=== Elections in the 1980s ===
1989 Queensland state election: Southport
Party	Candidate	Votes	%	±%
Labor	Andrew Prenzler	6,001	32.5	+10.2
National	Mick Veivers	5,880	31.9	−19.0
Liberal	Keith Thompson	5,708	30.9	+7.4
Democrats	Eamonn Sherrard	459	2.5	−0.8
Greens	John Roe	414	2.2	+2.2
Total formal votes		18,462	96.9	−1.3
Informal votes		585	3.1	+1.3
Turnout		19,047	88.6	−0.5
Two-party-preferred result
National	Mick Veivers	11,272	61.1	−8.1
Labor	Andrew Prenzler	7,190	38.9	+8.1
National hold		Swing	−8.1	

1987 Southport state by-election
Party	Candidate	Votes	%	±%
National	Mick Veivers	7,164	46.20	−4.72
Liberal	Keith Thompson	3,928	25.33	+1.80
Labor	Robert Lee	3,806	24.54	+2.26
Independent	Jim McDonagh	490	3.16	+3.16
Independent	William Aabraham-Steer	118	0.76	+0.76
Total formal votes		15,506	97.93	−0.28
Informal votes		327	2.07	+0.28
Turnout		15,833	74.52	−14.56
Two-party-preferred result
National	Mick Veivers	10,530	67.91	
Labor	Robert Lee	4976	32.09	
National hold		Swing		

1986 Queensland state election: Southport
Party	Candidate	Votes	%	±%
National	Doug Jennings	8,338	50.9	−1.2
Liberal	Timothy Baker	3,853	23.5	+8.4
Labor	Alfred Stubbs	3,648	22.3	−10.5
Democrats	Susan Petersen	535	3.3	+3.3
Total formal votes		16,374	98.2	
Informal votes		299	1.8	
Turnout		16,673	89.1	
Two-party-preferred result
National	Doug Jennings	10,430	63.7	+3.0
Labor	Alfred Stubbs	5,944	36.3	−3.0
National hold		Swing	+3.0	

1983 Queensland state election: Southport
Party	Candidate	Votes	%	±%
National	Doug Jennings	10,406	52.1	+18.4
Labor	Ian Rogers	6,543	32.8	+7.4
Liberal	Carol McLaughlin	3,024	15.1	−23.4
Total formal votes		19,973	98.1	+0.8
Informal votes		380	1.9	−0.8
Turnout		20,353	89.5	+4.0
Two-party-preferred result
National	Doug Jennings	12,755	63.9	+0.6
Labor	Ian Rogers	7,218	36.1	−0.6
National hold		Swing	+0.6	

1980 Queensland state election: Southport
Party	Candidate	Votes	%	±%
Liberal	Peter White	6,376	38.5	+4.4
National	Doug Jennings	5,570	33.7	−2.5
Labor	Ian Rogers	4,195	25.4	−3.2
Progress	Kevin Chaffey	219	1.3	+1.3
Independent	Peter Courtney	112	0.7	+0.7
Independent	Grace Plunkett	67	0.4	+0.4
Total formal votes		16,539	97.3	−1.0
Informal votes		461	2.7	+1.0
Turnout		17,000	85.5	−3.7
Two-candidate-preferred result
National	Doug Jennings	8,623	52.1	+11.9
Liberal	Peter White	7,916	47.9	−11.9
National gain from Liberal		Swing	+11.9	

=== Elections in the 1970s ===
1977 Queensland state election: Southport
Party	Candidate	Votes	%	±%
National	Norman Rix	5,022	36.2	
Liberal	Peter White	4,738	34.1	
Labor	Reginald Carter	3,967	28.6	
Independent	William Aabraham-Steer	150	1.1	
Total formal votes		13,877	98.3	
Informal votes		243	1.7	
Turnout		14,120	89.2	
Two-party-preferred result
Liberal	Peter White	8,811	63.5	−5.9
Labor	Reginald Carter	5,066	36.5	+5.9
Two-candidate-preferred result
Liberal	Peter White	8,296	59.8	
National	Norman Rix	5,581	40.2	
Liberal gain from National		Swing	N/A	

=== Elections in the 1950s ===
1957 Queensland state election: Southport
Party	Candidate	Votes	%	±%
Country	Eric Gaven	9,650	73.9	+7.9
Labor	William Bedford	3,401	26.1	−7.9
Total formal votes		13,051	98.8	−0.6
Informal votes		154	1.2	+0.6
Turnout		13,205	93.9	+2.2
Country hold		Swing	+7.9	

1956 Queensland state election: Southport
Party	Candidate	Votes	%	±%
Country	Eric Gaven	7,827	66.0	+5.8
Labor	William Belford	4,027	34.0	−5.8
Total formal votes		11,854	99.4	+0.1
Informal votes		74	0.6	−0.1
Turnout		11,928	91.7	−1.5
Country hold		Swing	+5.8	

1953 Queensland state election: Southport
Party	Candidate	Votes	%	±%
Country	Eric Gaven	6,089	60.2	+11.2
Labor	Edgar Hill	4,031	39.8	+11.0
Total formal votes		10,120	99.3	−0.3
Informal votes		74	0.7	+0.3
Turnout		10,194	93.2	+2.2
Country hold		Swing	−2.8	

1950 Queensland state election: Southport
Party	Candidate	Votes	%	±%
Country	Eric Gaven	4,768	49.0	
Labor	Edgar Hill	2,800	28.8	
Independent	William Elson-Green	2,167	22.3	
Total formal votes		9,735	99.6	
Informal votes		36	0.4	
Turnout		9,771	91.0	
Country hold		Swing		
