= George Graham (Australian footballer) =

Australian rules footballer, born 1903

Personal information
- Full name: Andrew George Graham
- Born: 12 July 1903; Bairnsdale, Victoria
- Died: 12 June 1983 (aged 79); Ballarat, Victoria
- Height: 183 cm (6 ft 0 in)
- Weight: 75 kg (165 lb)

Playing career^{1}
| Years | Club | Games (Goals) |
| 1927 | Hawthorn | 1 (1) |
- ^{1} Playing statistics correct to the end of 1927.

George Graham (12 July 1903 – 12 June 1983) was an Australian rules footballer who played with Hawthorn in the Victorian Football League (VFL).
