= Ben Graham =

Ben Graham may refer to:

- Ben Graham (footballer) (born 1973), Australian rules football player and American football punter
- Benjamin Graham (1894–1976), the "father of value investing"
- Benjamin S. Graham (1900–1960), the "father of Paperwork Simplification" creator of the first business process mapping (flowcharting) methodology
