= Paul Graham =

Paul Graham may refer to:

- Paul Graham (American football) (1892–1985), American college football player and coach
- Paul Graham (basketball player) (born 1967), former NBA player
- Paul Graham (basketball coach) (born 1951), college basketball coach
- Paul Graham (bodybuilder), Australian professional wrestler and bodybuilder
- Paul Graham (novelist), American novelist
- Paul Graham (photographer) (born 1956), British photographer
- Paul Graham (programmer) (born 1964), Lisp programmer, venture capitalist, and essayist
- Paul Graham (television producer), Canadian television executive producer and network vice-president

== See also ==
- Graham Paul (born 1947), fencer
