= Grahame Hardie =

Scottish biochemist

Professor Grahame Hardie FRS FRSE FMedSci
- Born: 5 April 1950 (age 76)
- Known for: Discovery of AMP-activated protein kinase
- Scientific career
- Fields: Biochemistry
- Workplaces: University of Dundee
- Thesis: Cereal Carbohydrases (1974)
- Website: www.lifesci.dundee.ac.uk/people/grahame-hardie

David Grahame Hardie (born 1950) is a Scottish biochemist, and Professor of Cellular Signalling, at the School of Life Sciences, University of Dundee.

== Career and research ==
He was a member of the Faculty of 1000. He is known for the discovery of AMP-activated protein kinase (AMPK).

=== Publications ===
- "Regulation of AMP-activated protein kinase by natural and synthetic activators", Acta Pharmaceutica Sinica B (2016) 6, (1–19)
- "AMP-activated protein kinase: a cellular energy sensor with a key role in metabolic disorders and in cancer", Biochemical Society Transactions (2011) 39, (1–13)
- D. Grahame Hardie, ed. (1999). "Analysis of signal transduction pathways using protein serine - threonine phosphate inhibitors". Protein phosphorylation: a practical approach. Oxford University Press. ISBN 978-0-19-963729-4.
- Biochemical messengers: hormones, neurotransmitters, and growth factors. Springer. 1991. ISBN 978-0-412-30350-0.
