= James Graham (footballer) =

English footballer

James Graham was an English footballer active around the turn of the twentieth century. He played 84 times in The Football League for Grimsby Town between 1893 and 1897, and also had a lengthy stint with New Brompton of the Southern League, where he made 86 league and FA Cup appearances.
