= Peter Sebastian Graham =

Peter Sebastian Graham is a contemporary Australian artist, painter, printmaker and sculptor. He was born in 1970 in Sydney, New South Wales. He moved with his family in 1983 to Melbourne, Victoria, where he currently lives and works.

== Early life and influences ==
Graham decided to become an artist from a very young age. His career was strongly influenced by his parents – Carolyn Graham, a self-taught printmaker and his father, Bob Graham, a well-known children’s picture book author and illustrator.

Graham graduated with a Bachelor of Fine Arts (Painting) from the Victorian College of the Arts, Prahran campus (Melbourne) in 1991, where he studied under Philip Hunter. After leaving art school, Graham received the support and patronage of James Mollison AO, former director of the National Gallery of Australia and the National Gallery of Victoria. Graham accompanied James Mollison and Vincent Langford overseas to view art museums in New York, Paris and Rome in 1992, and London and Germany in 1997.

== Career ==
Graham’s first solo exhibition, ‘Depot—Animal Magician’s Hut’, was held at the Australian Centre for Contemporary Art, Melbourne, in 1990, on the invitation of its director, Grazia Gunn. The theme of the exhibition was the traveller-explorer: of astronauts journeying into space juxtaposed against the terrestrial search for a wild puma that had been sighted in the Victorian countryside. It was through this search that Graham met his future wife, Caitlin, who was introduced to him because she had sighted the elusive puma while out horseback riding.

Since then, Graham has had a dozen solo exhibitions with Tolarno Galleries, Melbourne, and Kaliman Galleries, Sydney. In his Tolarno exhibitions ‘Song of Substance’ in 1994 and ‘Sound of No Shore’ in 1996, his surfaces were “dense with different media and techniques, including photography, woodcut, gouache, sewing, charcoal, graphite, and acetate.” In ‘Fertile Ground’ in 2005, Graham portrayed a growth of the senses that is stimulated by darkness. His work was “populated by totemic animal and plant forms, picked out in dots of light—like water droplets on a spider’s web—a spectral vision in the dark.”

In ‘Charmed Earth’, a solo exhibition for Tolarno at the Melbourne Art Fair in 2010, Graham produced 100 small sculptures. The idea for the project originated when he started making plasticine forms together with his two children. He first produced the figures in clay, then created rough silicone moulds to cast the figures in coloured polyurethane, which he reworked to obtain shiner, more polished surfaces.

Graham has also participated in numerous group exhibitions across Australia. For the National Gallery of Victoria’s ‘In Relief: Australian Wood Engravings, Woodcuts and Linocuts’ (1997), Graham used the woodblock print not as finished product but as a starting point for creating “densely layered unique works of art.” Other group exhibitions include the Blake Prize Touring Exhibition (2010); the Monash University 50th Anniversary Celebrations at the McClelland Gallery (2008); the National Gallery of Victoria Touring Exhibition ‘Lives and Times’ (2007); ‘Australian Culture Now’, a joint exhibition of the National Gallery of a joint exhibition of the National Gallery of Victoria and the Australian Centre for the Moving Image (2004); and ‘National Works on Paper’ at the Mornington Peninsula Art Gallery, Victoria (2000).

Internationally, Graham’s work was displayed in 2002 at the ‘Crossing: New Art from Australia’ exhibition at the University of Art and Design, Helsinki and in 2011 at the ‘Out Of Australia: Prints and Drawings from Sidney Nolan to Rover Thomas’ exhibition at the British Museum, London. Three works were on view, including one from a group of nine jellyfish drawings in ink and gouache that suggests “the transmutation of idea into form, the incarnation of image from human thought”.

Graham is represented by Tolarno Galleries. Some of his major paintings and drawings have been collected by the National Gallery of Australia, the British Museum, the National Gallery of Victoria, the Museum of Contemporary Art (MCA) Sydney, the Art Gallery of Western Australia, and the Newcastle and other regional galleries. His works are also owned by a number of universities and private collectors.
