= Grahame McConechy =

Australian rules footballer

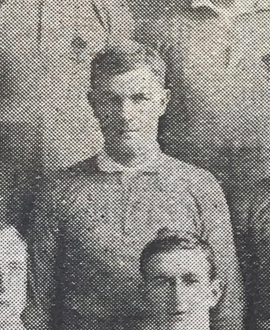
- McConechy in 1904

Personal information
- Full name: Grahame Leviston McConechy
- Born: 6 June 1880; Harrow, Victoria
- Died: 27 July 1942 (aged 62); Newtown, New South Wales
- Original team: Port Melbourne / South Wesley

Playing career^{1}
| Years | Club | Games (Goals) |
| 1904 | Collingwood | 7 (6) |
- ^{1} Playing statistics correct to the end of 1904.

Grahame Leviston McConechy (6 June 1880 – 27 July 1942) was an Australian rules footballer who played in the Victorian Football League for Collingwood Football Club.

A forward, McConechy only managed to play seven games in the 1904 VFL season for the Collingwood after being recruited from Port Melbourne via Middlepark Wesleys.
