= Robert Hills =

Robert Hills may refer to:

- Robert Hills (artist) (1769–1844), English painter and etcher
- Robert Hills (cricketer, born 1813) (1813–1884), English cricketer
- Robert Hills (cricketer, born 1837) (1837–1909), Scottish cricketer and merchant
- Robert Hills, hairdresser and wigmaker, co-founder of Hills & Saunders, a Victorian photographic firm

== See also ==
- Robert Hill (disambiguation)
