= Andrew Graham (Australian footballer) =

Australian rules footballer

Personal information
- Full name: Andrew Graham
- Nickname: Andy
- Born: 18 July 1963 (age 63)
- Original team: Coburg
- Height: 180 cm (5 ft 11 in)
- Weight: 80 kg (176 lb)

Playing career^{1}
Years	Club	Games (Goals)
1983	Carlton	1 (0)
- ^{1} Playing statistics correct to the end of 1983.

Andrew "Andy" Graham (born 18 July 1963) is a former Australian rules footballer who played for the Carlton Football Club in the Victorian Football League (VFL).
