= John Graham (Ohio politician) =

American politician (1802–1851)

Member of the Ohio Senate from the Stark County district
- In office 1846–1848

Personal details
- Born: 1802 Bedford County, Pennsylvania, U.S.
- Died: November 3, 1851 (aged 48–49) Jackson Township, Stark County, Ohio, U.S.
- Party: Whig
- Spouse: Susan Troup
- Children: 12
- Occupation: Politician

John Graham (1802 – November 3, 1851) was an American politician. He served as a member of the Ohio Senate, representing Stark County, from 1846 to 1848.

== Early life ==
John Graham was born in 1802 in Bedford County, Pennsylvania. His father was Captain Graham, an officer in the Revolutionary War. His mother's maiden name was Shaw and she was the widow of William Hartley. Graham grew up in Bedford County.

== Career ==
Graham worked in the mercantile business in Pennsylvania. Graham moved to Canton, Ohio, in 1824. He purchased 520 acres (210 ha) of land in Jackson Township from his brother-in-laws Henry and Jacob Troup.

Graham was a Whig. He was elected as a member of the Ohio Senate representing Stark County, serving from 1846 to 1848.

== Personal life ==
Graham married Susan Troup of Pennsylvania. They had 12 children: William, Ella Olivia, Lavinia, Charles, Caroline, Hamilton, Edward, John, Susan, Alfred R., George and Marshall. His daughter Ella married Ira M. Allen, an educator and one-term treasurer of Stark County. His daughter Caroline P. married Lewis V. Bockius, a businessman in Canton and city treasurer. He was a member of the Methodist Episcopal church.

Graham died on November 3, 1851, at his farm in Jackson Township.
