= Murrayshall Country Estate & Golf Club =

Golf club in Scone, Perth and Kinross, Scotland

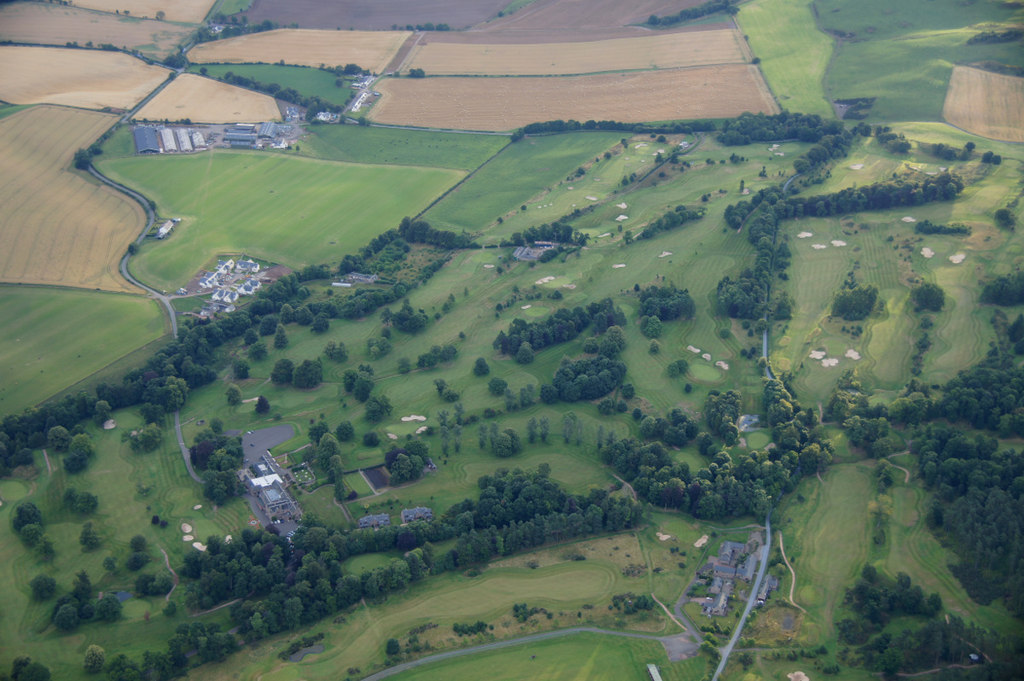
- Murrayshall from the air, looking northeast, 2013

- Location in Scotland Location in Perth and Kinross, Scotland
- 56.419502°N 3.370637°W

Club information
- Location: Scone, Perth and Kinross, Scotland
- Established: 1981; 45 years ago
- Tota holes: 36
- Website: https://www.murrayshall.co.uk/

Murrayshall Course (18 holes)
- Designed by: J. Hamilton Stutt
- Par: 73
- Length: 6,120 yards (5,600 m)

Lynedoch Course (18 holes)
- Par: 70
- Length: 5,684 yards (5,197 m)

Murrayshall Country Estate & Golf Club, in Scone, Perth and Kinross, Scotland, features two 20th-century golf courses surrounding a 17th-century house. The golf courses were completed in 1981, having received approval from the Tayside Planning and Development Committee in 1976. Located approximately 1 mile (1.6 km) south of Perth Airport, the two golf courses are Murrayshall and Lynedoch.

The architect of Murrayshall Course was J. Hamilton Stutt (1924–2008).

The 41-bedroom Murrayshall House was built by Andrew Murray, son of Andrew Murray, 1st Lord Balvaird, in 1664. The building, which was later owned by Francis Norie-Miller, was put on the market for £4 million in 2015. It was voted Central Scotland and Fife's Golf Hotel of the Year shortly beforehand. Hetherly Capital Partners purchased the property in 2016, and later undertook a £10-million regeneration project, to a design by Fergus Purdie Architects.

In 2021, the new owners submitted plans to: add a further fifty rooms to its hotel, create a golf academy and driving range, build fifty new homes, forty self-catering cottages and twenty-five tree houses or glamping pods.
