= Richard Graeme =

English soldier

Sir Richard Graeme (sometimes spelt as Graham) was an English soldier noted for his service in Ireland during Tyrone's Rebellion. At the Battle of Aherlow on 16 September 1600 he defeated a force of rebels led by James FitzThomas FitzGerald, the Earl of Tyrone's leading supporter in Munster. Although Fitzgerald was able to escape with some of his forces, it destroyed much of his power in the area.

At the decisive Battle of Kinsale in 1601, Graeme commanded a cavalry unit under Lord Mountjoy. He commanded the night watch of horsemen, and his men were some of the first into position as Mountjoy ordered his troops into defensive lines to face Tyrone's advance. The Anglo-Irish cavalry successfully routed both the cavalry and infantry of the rebel forces. Serving alongside Richard Wingfield and Richard de Burgh, Graeme's men were involved in the breaking of the rebel ranks and their pursuit.

== Bibliography ==
- Falls, Cyril. Elizabeth's Irish Wars. Constable & Company, 1996.
