= William A. Graham (Islamic studies scholar) =

American Islamic studies scholar

William Albert Graham Jr. (born 1943) is an American scholar of Islamic studies and the history of religion, and a longtime member of the Faculty of Arts and Sciences at Harvard University. He also served for ten years as the Dean of Harvard Divinity School. He currently holds the title of Murray A. Albertson Professor of Middle Eastern Studies, emeritus, and Harvard University Distinguished Service Professor, emeritus. Graham's scholarship has focused on early Islamic religious history, scripture, and comparative studies in religion, with particular attention to oral aspects of written scriptural traditions.

== Biography ==
Graham was born August 16, 1943, in Raleigh, North Carolina and raised in Chapel Hill, NC. He earned his B.A. (1966) summa cum laude in comparative literature from the University of North Carolina at Chapel Hill, and his M.A. (1970) and Ph.D. (1973) from Harvard University in the History of Religion specializing in Islamic Studies. Graham joined the Faculty of Arts and Sciences at Harvard in 1973, and became professor of the history of religion and Islamic studies in 1985. He has held Guggenheim and Alexander von Humboldt fellowships and is a fellow of the American Academy of Arts and Sciences and member of the American Philosophical Society.

At the University of North Carolina, Graham was a Morehead Scholar, competed as a varsity cross-country runner, and was elected to Phi Beta Kappa and the Order of the Golden Fleece, served as Delegata (president) of the Order of the Grail, and received the Frank Porter Graham Outstanding Senior award. Before his senior year, he studied German Literature as a UNC exchange scholar at Göttingen in 1964–65. During his graduate study, he undertook intensive Arabic-language training at the Middle East Centre for Arabic Studies in Shemlan, Lebanon, and pursued non-degree research at the universities of London and Tübingen. During his graduate training at Harvard, Graham's teachers and principal advisors included the historian of religion Wilfred Cantwell Smith and the Islamicist Muhsin Mahdi; Smith in particular as founding director of Harvard's Center for the Study of World Religions shaped Graham's comparative approach to the study of religion, an influence Graham has said continued throughout his career.

== Career ==
Graham joined the Harvard faculty in 1973 and advanced through the professorial ranks within the Faculty of Arts and Sciences. In 1985, he was named Professor of the History of Religion and Islamic Studies. In 2001, he was appointed Murray A. Albertson Professor of Middle Eastern Studies and Professor of the History of Religion. In 2002 he was seconded to the Harvard Divinity School and joined its faculty as Dean and John Lord O'Brien Professor of Divinity, a position he held for ten years.

Graham has been recognized with a John Simon Guggenheim Fellowship, an Alexander von Humboldt Fellowship, and the Quinquinnial Award for Excellence in Research in Islamic History and Culture from the Research Centre for Islamic History, Art and Culture (Istanbul) in 2000.

In addition to his deanship, Graham has held numerous administrative positions at Harvard, including Director of the Center for Middle Eastern Studies (1990–1996), Chair of the Department of Near Eastern Languages and Civilizations (1997–2002), and Chair of the Committee on the Study of Religion (1987–1990). He also served as Chair of the Council on Graduate Studies in Religion for the United States and Canada.

=== Harvard Divinity School ===
Graham was appointed Acting Dean of Harvard Divinity School in January 2002 and formally became Dean and John Lord O'Brien Professor of Divinity six months later following a national search. During his decade of leadership, he expanded the faculty and strengthened programs in multiple religious traditions, including Buddhism, Hinduism, Islam, and Judaism.

Graham stepped down as Dean at the end of the 2011–2012 academic year to return to fulltime teaching as the Albertson Professor after a year of academic leave. In recognition of his contributions, he was named also Harvard University Distinguished Service Professor.

== Scholarly work and research ==
His scholarly contributions include research on the Qur'an and its role as scripture Hadith, prophetic traditions, and comparative issues in Islamic, Hindu, Buddhist, and Christian history.

Notable publications include Divine Word and Prophetic Word in Early Islam (1977), which shared the 1978 History of Religions Book Prize from the American Council of Learned Societies, and Beyond the Written Word: Oral Aspects of Scripture in the History of Religion (1987), which has been widely cited across various fields of religious studies. He is also a co-author of the college textbook The Heritage of World Civilizations, now in its tenth edition, and co-editor of Islamfiche: Readings from Islamic Primary Sources.

In 2022, a festschrift titled Non sola scriptura: Essays on the Qur'an and Islam in Honour of William A. Graham was published by Routledge, featuring contributions by colleagues and former students. The volume explores themes central to Graham’s work, such as Islamic history and scripture, oral and textual traditions, and the academic study of religion.

== Reception and influence ==
Graham has been described by fellow scholars as an influential and pioneering figure in Islamic studies whose work combines philologically rigorous textual scholarship with the comparative methods of the broader study of religion. In 2022, a festschrift titled Non sola scriptura: Essays on the Qur'an and Islam in Honour of William A. Graham was published by Routledge, featuring contributions by North-American and international colleagues and former students. The volume explores themes central to Graham's work, such as Islamic history and scripture, oral and textual traditions, and the academic study of religion. In their preface to this collection of essays, the editors write that ''Divine Word and Prophetic Word in Early Islam'' is unusual among scholarly monographs in being valued equally by theorists of religion and philologically oriented Islamicists, and that Graham's broader body of work has consistently bridged what had often been a divide between text-based Islamic studies and the theoretically engaged study of religion.

In her essay in the latter volume, the historian of religion Diana Eck, a Harvard colleague of nearly fifty years, credits Graham's early work on scripture as a category with directly influencing the later work of his own graduate mentor, Wilfred Cantwell Smith, and recalls Graham's role, alongside Richard R. Niebuhr and herself, in founding Harvard's undergraduate concentration in Comparative Study of Religion in 1974. In a separate chapter examining Graham's academic administration, Raquel M. Ukeles argues that his decade as Divinity School dean should be understood as continuous with, rather than separate from, his scholarly commitments to comparative religion, noting that he used the deanship to expand the school's engagement with non-Christian traditions.

== Selected publications ==
- Divine Word and Prophetic Word in Early Islam (1977)
- Beyond the Written Word: Oral Aspects of Scripture in the History of Religion (1987)
- Three Faiths, One God (2002)
- Islamic and Comparative Religious Studies (2010)
- The Heritage of World Civilizations (1986ff.; 10th ed., 2015)
