= William Grahame =

William Grahame may refer to:

- William Grahame (1808–1890), member of the New South Wales Legislative Assembly for Monaro, 1865–69 and 1872–74
- William Grahame (1841–1906), member of the New South Wales Legislative Assembly for Newcastle, 1889–89 and 1891–94
- William Calman Grahame (1863–1945), member of the New South Wales Legislative Assembly for Wickham, 1907–20
