= Joseph Graham (footballer) =

English footballer

Personal information
- Full name: Joseph Gilpin Graham
- Date of birth: 1889
- Place of birth: Hebburn, England
- Date of death: 1968 (aged 78–79)
- Position: Wing half

Senior career*
Years	Team	Apps	(Gls)
1910–1911	Wallsend Park Villa		
1911–1921	Stockport County	86	(3)
1921–1922	Exeter City	12	(0)
1922	New Brighton		
1923	Ashton National		
Total		98	(3)
- * Club domestic league appearances and goals

Joseph Gilpin Graham (1889–1968) was an English footballer who played in the Football League for Exeter City and Stockport County.
