= Bill Graham (Canadian football) =

Canadian football player (1935–2020)

Billy Graham
Profile
- Position: Halfback

Personal information
- Born: November 15, 1935; Hamilton, Ontario, Canada
- Died: January 2, 2020 (aged 84); Ontario, Canada
- Listed height: 5 ft 7 in (1.70 m)
- Listed weight: 165 lb (75 kg)

Career history
- 1953–1960: Hamilton Tiger-Cats

Awards and highlights
- 2× Grey Cup champion (1953, 1957)

William Douglas Lionel Graham (November 15, 1935 – January 2, 2020) was a Canadian professional football player who played for the Hamilton Tiger-Cats. He won the Grey Cup with them in 1953 and 1957. Graham previously played football with the Kitchener-Waterloo Dutchmen, and was educated at St. Andre's College. He was chairman of the Sources of Knowledge Forum of the Bruce Peninsula. Previously he was a manager, president, and eventually majority owner of University Scholarships of Canada. He lived on the Bruce Peninsula and in Mississauga, Ontario. Graham died on January 2, 2020.
