= Charles Passmore Graham =

United States Army general (1927–2021)

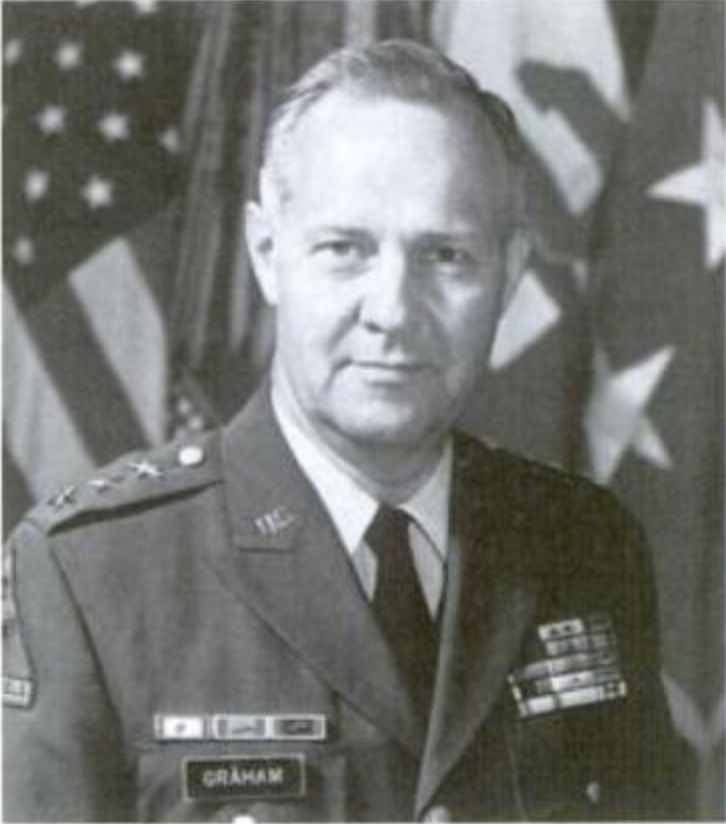
- Born: 19 December 1927; Seward, Alaska, U.S.
- Died: 11 February 2021 (aged 93); Texas, U.S.
- Military career
- Allegiance: United States
- Branch: United States Army
- Service years: 1950–1985
- Rank: Lieutenant general
- Commands: Second United States Army
- Awards: Legion of Merit; Bronze Star Medal; Purple Heart; Meritorious Service Medal; Air Medal

Charles Passmore Graham (19 December 1927 – 11 February 2021) was a lieutenant general in the United States Army who served as commander of the Second United States Army. He graduated from the United States Military Academy in 1950 with a B.S. degree in engineering. Graham also earned an M.S. degree in mechanical engineering from the University of Michigan in 1957. After his death in 2021, he was interred at Fort Sam Houston National Cemetery.
