= Edward Graham =

Edward Graham may refer to:

- Sir Edward Graham, 9th Baronet (1820–1864)
- Edward (Bud) T. Graham (1927–2003), American classical recording engineer
- Edward Kidder Graham (1876–1918), American educational administrator
- Edward John Graham (1866–1918), Member of Parliament for Tullamore, 1914–18
- Edward T. P. Graham (1872–1964), American architect
- Edward Graham (British Army officer) (1859−1951)
- Ed Graham (born 1977), English musician, original drummer of the rock band The Darkness
- Eddie Graham (1930–1985), American professional wrestler
- Eddie Graham (politician) (1897–1957), Australian politician
- Ted Graham (ice hockey) (1904–1979), Canadian ice hockey defenceman
- Ted Graham, Baron Graham of Edmonton (1925–2020), British Labour Co-operative politician
