= Patrick Graham (judge) =

British barrister and High Court judge

Sir Patrick Graham

Justice of the High Court
- In office 1969–1981

Personal details
- Born: John Patrick Graham

Sir John Patrick Graham (26 November 1906 – 5 December 1993) was a British barrister and High Court judge. A leading intellectual property law specialist, he sat in the Chancery Division of the High Court from 1969 to 1981, where he was senior Patent Judge.

The son of Alexander Graham, a Shrewsbury-based barrister, and Mary Adeline Cock, Patrick Graham was educated at Shrewsbury School and Gonville and Caius College, Cambridge, where he read classics, then Law. Called to the Bar by the Middle Temple in 1930, he completed his pupillage with Lionel Heald in the chambers of Sir Stafford Cripps, which he joined. During the Second World War, Graham served with the Royal Air Force Volunteer Reserve and later at Supreme Headquarters Allied Expeditionary Force. He was demobilised in 1945 with the rank of group captain.
