= Bill Graham (baseball) =

American baseball player (1937–2006)

- Pitcher
- Born: January 21, 1937; Flemingsburg, Kentucky, U.S.
- Died: October 26, 2006 (aged 69); Flemingsburg, Kentucky, U.S.
- Batted: Right Threw: Right

MLB debut
- October 2, 1966, for the Detroit Tigers

Last MLB appearance
- September 29, 1967, for the New York Mets

MLB statistics
- Pitching record: 1–2
- Earned run average: 2.45
- Strikeouts: 16
- Stats at Baseball Reference

Teams
- Detroit Tigers (1966); New York Mets (1967)

William Albert Graham (January 21, 1937 – October 26, 2006) was an American professional baseball player who was a pitcher in Major League Baseball for two seasons in the 1960s. He played for the Detroit Tigers in 1966 and the New York Mets in 1967, and compiled a 1–2 record, with a 2.45 earned run average, and 16 strikeouts in 29 1/3 innings pitched.

He was born in Flemingsburg, Kentucky, and later died there at the age of 69.

== See also ==
- List of Florida Gators baseball players
