= William Graham (footballer, born 1914) =

English footballer

Personal information
- Full name: William Graham
- Date of birth: 3 October 1914
- Place of birth: Hetton-le-Hole, England
- Date of death: September 1996 (aged 81)
- Place of death: Cheshire, England
- Height: 5 ft 9 in (1.75 m)
- Position: Inside forward

Senior career*
Years	Team	Apps	(Gls)
19xx–1932	Blyth Spartans		
1932–1935	Burnley	5	(2)
1935–1938	Bury	81	(29)
1938–1946	Norwich City	17	(4)
- * Club domestic league appearances and goals

William Graham (3 October 1914 – September 1996) was an English professional footballer who played as an inside forward.

Graham started his career in non-league football with Blyth Spartans before joining Football League Second Division club Burnley in September 1932. He made his debut for the club on 2 December 1933 in the 0–0 draw away at Millwall but did not appear again that season. Graham scored on his next outing for Burnley in the 3–3 draw with Bury on 27 October 1934. He scored again in the 1–3 defeat to Hull City on 19 March 1935 and played his final Burnley game on 13 April 1935 in the 1–2 loss against Bradford Park Avenue. Graham left Burnley at the end of the 1934–35 season and subsequently signed for Bury. For Bury he made 81 Football League appearances and scored 29 goals. He also played 4 F.A.Cup ties, scoring one goal. He later played for Norwich City.
