= Peter Graham (judge) =

Australian judge

The Honourable Peter Graham KC

Judge of the Federal Court of Australia
- In office 24 May 2005 – 6 September 2010

Personal details
- Born: Peter Ross Graham; 5 September 1940 (age 85)

Peter Ross Graham (born 5 September 1940) KC is a retired Justice of the Federal Court of Australia, serving from 2005 to 2010.

== Education and career ==
He studied at the University of Sydney and Harvard University, becoming a barrister in 1966 and Queen's Counsel in 1982.
