= Duveen (disambiguation) =

Joseph Duveen, 1st Baron Duveen (1869–1939) was a British art dealer.

Duveen may also refer to:

== People ==
- Henry J. Duveen (1854–1919), an art dealer
- Charles Joel Duveen (1871–1940), an antique dealer
- Joseph Joel Duveen (1843–1908), an art dealer

== Other ==
- Boeing Duveen and The Beautiful Soup, a 1960s British psychedelic rock band
