= The Graham Children =

Painting by William Hogarth

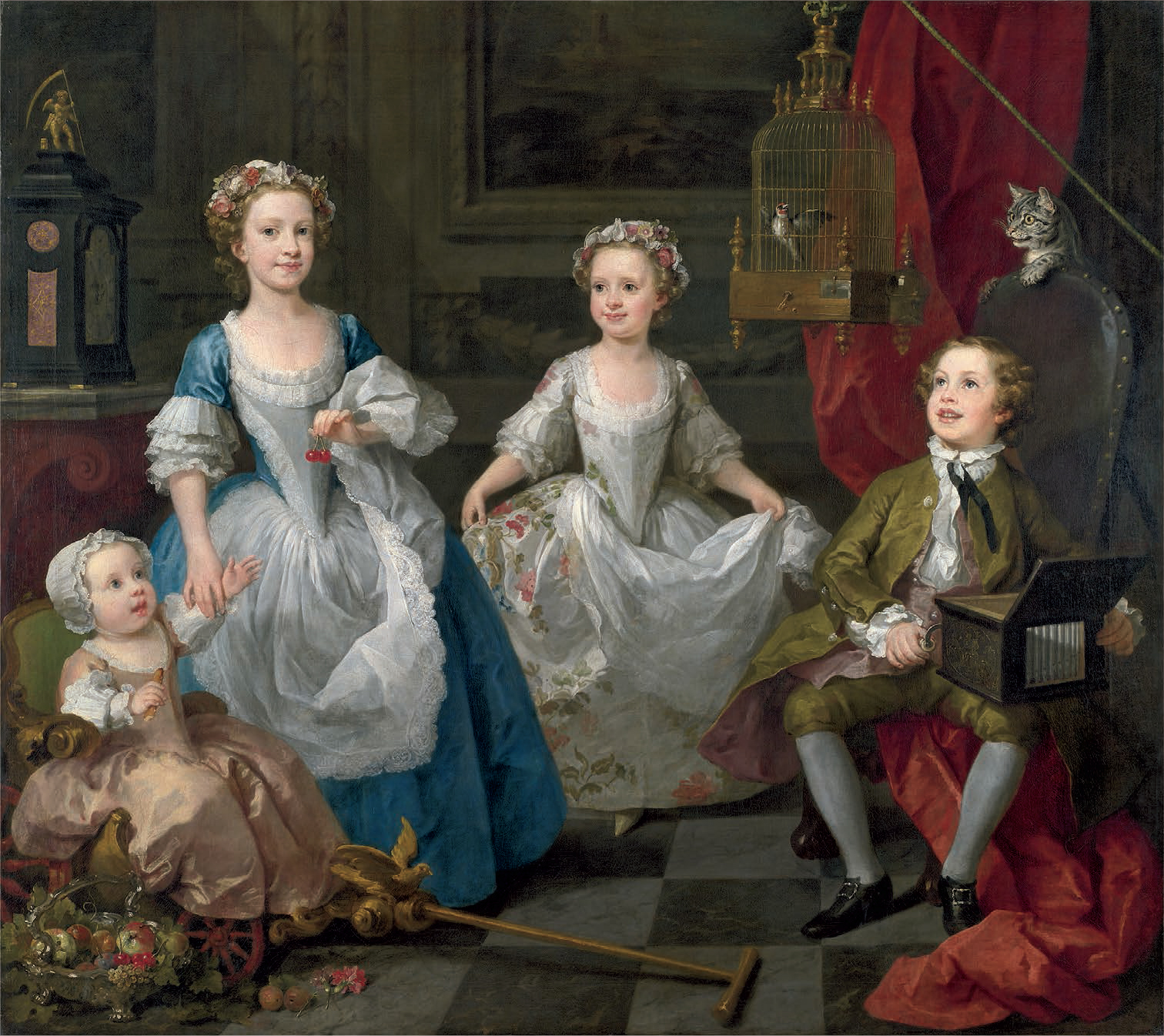
- Artist: William Hogarth
- Year: 1742
- Medium: Oil on canvas
- Dimensions: 160.5 cm × 181 cm (63.2 in × 71 in)
- Location: National Gallery; London

The Graham Children is an oil painting completed by William Hogarth in 1742. It is a group portrait depicting the four children of Daniel Graham, apothecary to King George II. The youngest child had died by the time the painting was completed.

== Provenance ==
The painting was in the ownership of Richard Robert Graham, depicted on the far right of the painting, at least until his death in 1816. It then had several owners before it was acquired by Lord Duveen who presented it to the British National Gallery in 1934.

== Composition ==
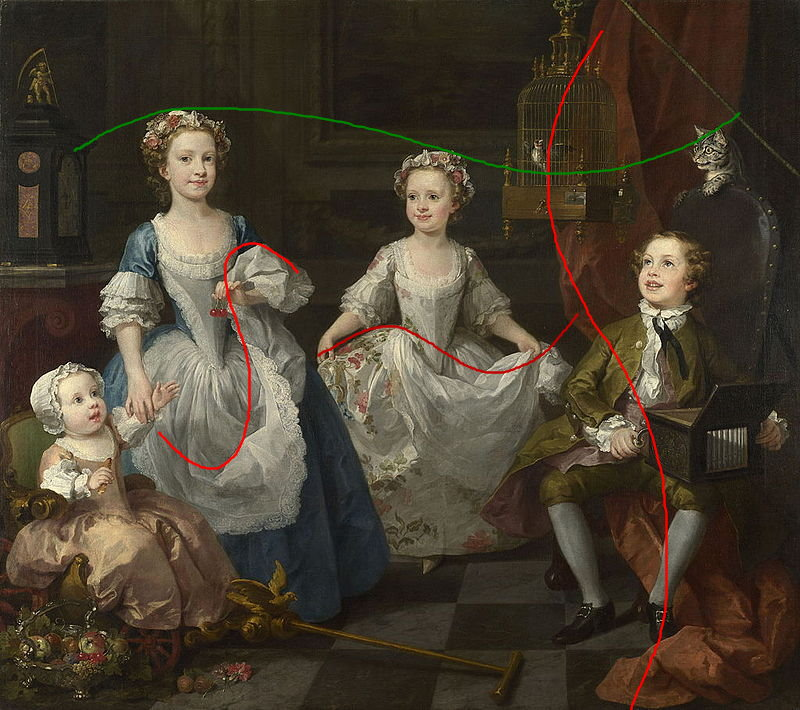
Serpentine lines on The Graham Children.

The Graham Children is a conversation piece, an informal group portrait of family or friends, often engaged in conversation or some other kind of activity, though the painting is larger than a typical work of that type. From left to right in the picture are Thomas, born 1740 and dressed in skirts as was typical for small boys until they were breeched, Henrietta, Anna Maria and Richard. (Note: The children are misidentified in Einberg's Manners & Morals, corrected in her Hogarth the Painter.)

Infant mortality in Britain was high in the eighteenth century, even for the children of the wealthy, and Thomas had died before the painting was completed. Hogarth used a study, probably completed after Thomas's death, as the basis for his image. With its numerous references to death and the passage of time, it may be that the painting is a form of memorial for Thomas.

The children are painted life size, surrounded by plush furnishings and fabrics that reflect the family's wealth. A gilded bird cage is suspended from a cord and Thomas sits in an ornate baby cart with a fine silver fruit bowl at his feet. Richard plays a tune on a bird-organ, apparently making the bird sing.

The French Rococo was at its height in the 1730s and its influence can be seen in the painting despite Hogarth not visiting France until 1743. William Gaunt thought that Hogarth was more familiar with current French painting than he liked to admit. The girl's aprons form serpentine S's, vertically in the oldest child, ending as it falls over her arm, and horizontally in the younger girl. A similar shape can be seen in the falling curtain on the right. The heads of the children and the cat create another noticeable S shape. The fruit bowl, a common subject in Rococo art, has been described as a "bravura piece of still-life painting" untypical of Hogarth's work.

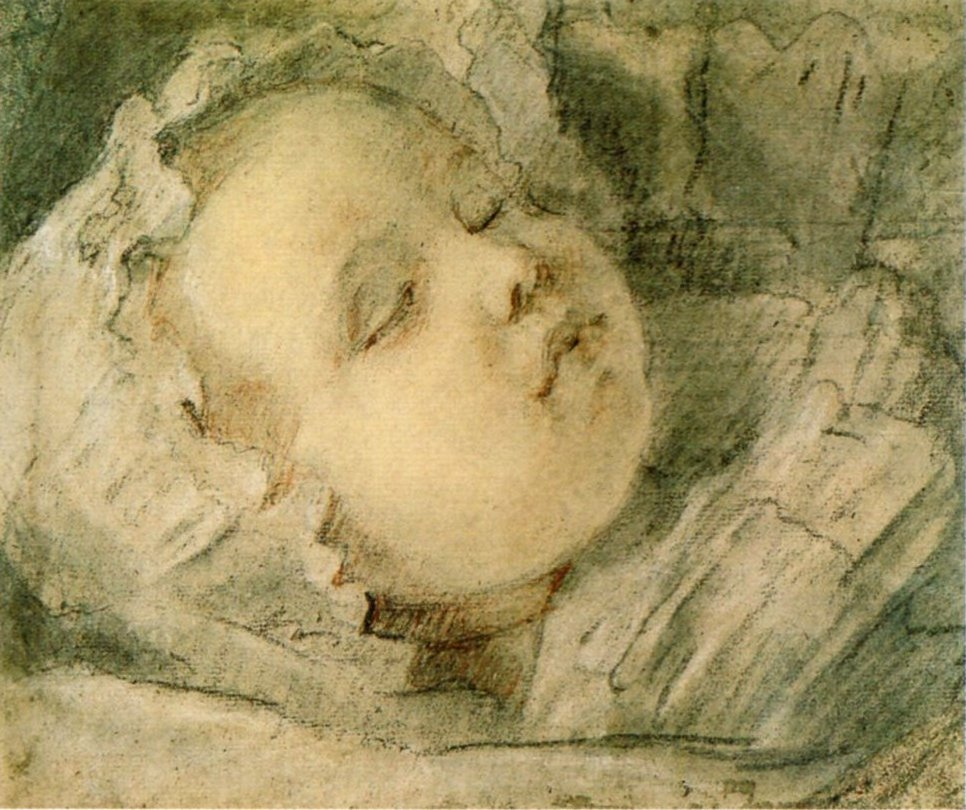
Study of Thomas Graham, William Hogarth, c. 1742. Black and red chalk on grey paper, British Museum, London. 22 x 27 cm.

== Themes ==
David Bindman described The Graham Children as having a theme worthy of a history painting. Hogarth turned what could have been a simple family scene, even one with a tragic edge, into a parable about the “passing of time and the vulnerability of innocence”. The picture plays with time with different parts moving at different speeds. The boys are captured in mid movement, like the cat and bird, while the girls seem to be completely still, so that the picture is both a snap shot of a fleeting moment and a static portrait simultaneously. The oldest, Henrietta, holds the wrist of the youngest, perhaps indicating her future role as a mother, but not tightly and neither exchange looks, but neither do any of the children. Henrietta, instead, looks at the spectator, indicating her awareness of the adult world that she will soon join. The other children, however, remain in the innocent bubble of childhood.

Thomas is fascinated by the glistening cherries held by his sister, which in Christian iconography represent the fruit of Paradise and the antidote to original sin, and for Henrietta symbolise the challenges she will soon face as she enters adulthood. Anna Maria practices the dance steps and curtseys that will be required of her in society, and Richard enjoys the musical performance of the finch. His bird-organ bears an image of Orpheus from Greek mythology, referring to the temporary harmony of man and nature that cannot last. On the clock stands a small winged figure with scythe and hour glass representing the passage of time, while the smiling cat eyes the caged bird, referring to the fragility of life. A wooden bird adorns the baby cart, like the caged bird unable to take flight. The crossed flowers at the baby's feet refer to the Christian legend that pink carnations sprang from the earth at the spot where Mary's tears fell after she saw Jesus carrying the cross, thus making the flower a symbol of motherly love.

The bird depicted is a goldfinch, which for centuries had symbolised the Redemption, appropriate here because of Thomas's death. (Note: Friedmann listed 486 paintings by 254 artists.)

Hogarth included wit and pathos in the same scene by audaciously placing the predatory cat in one corner and the recently deceased child in the other. The reaction of Thomas's parents to this combination, which might have been seen as in poor taste, is unknown. The painting remained in Richard Graham's possession until at least 1816.

=== Details ===
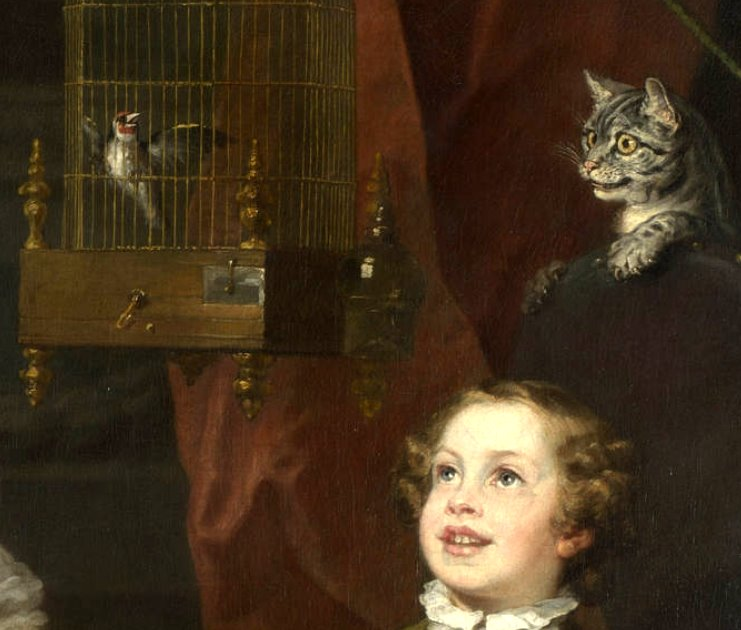
The cat and its prey

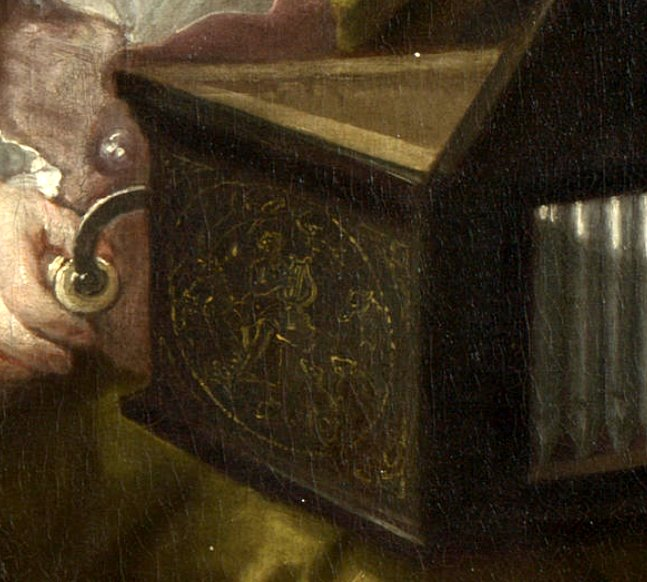
Orpheus on the bird-organ

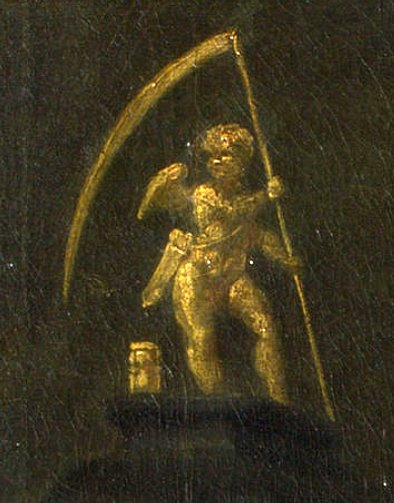
Time with scythe and hourglass

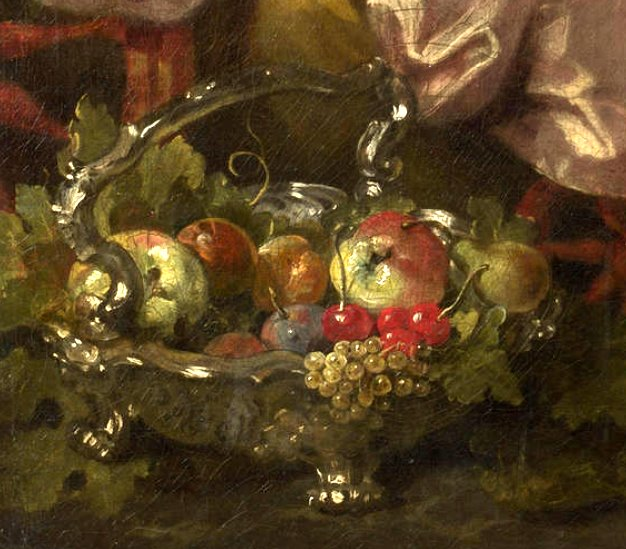
The fruit basket

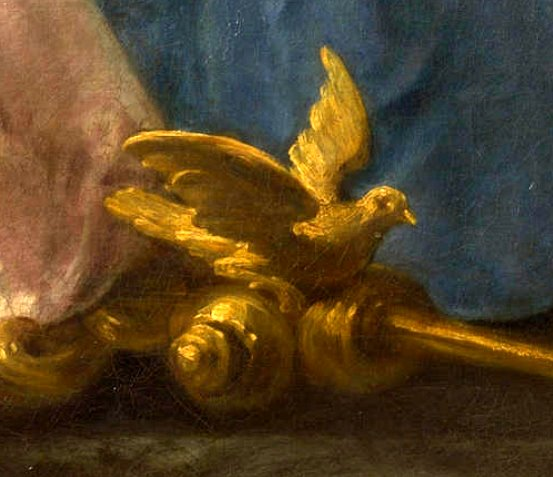
The flightless bird on the baby cart

== Antecedents ==
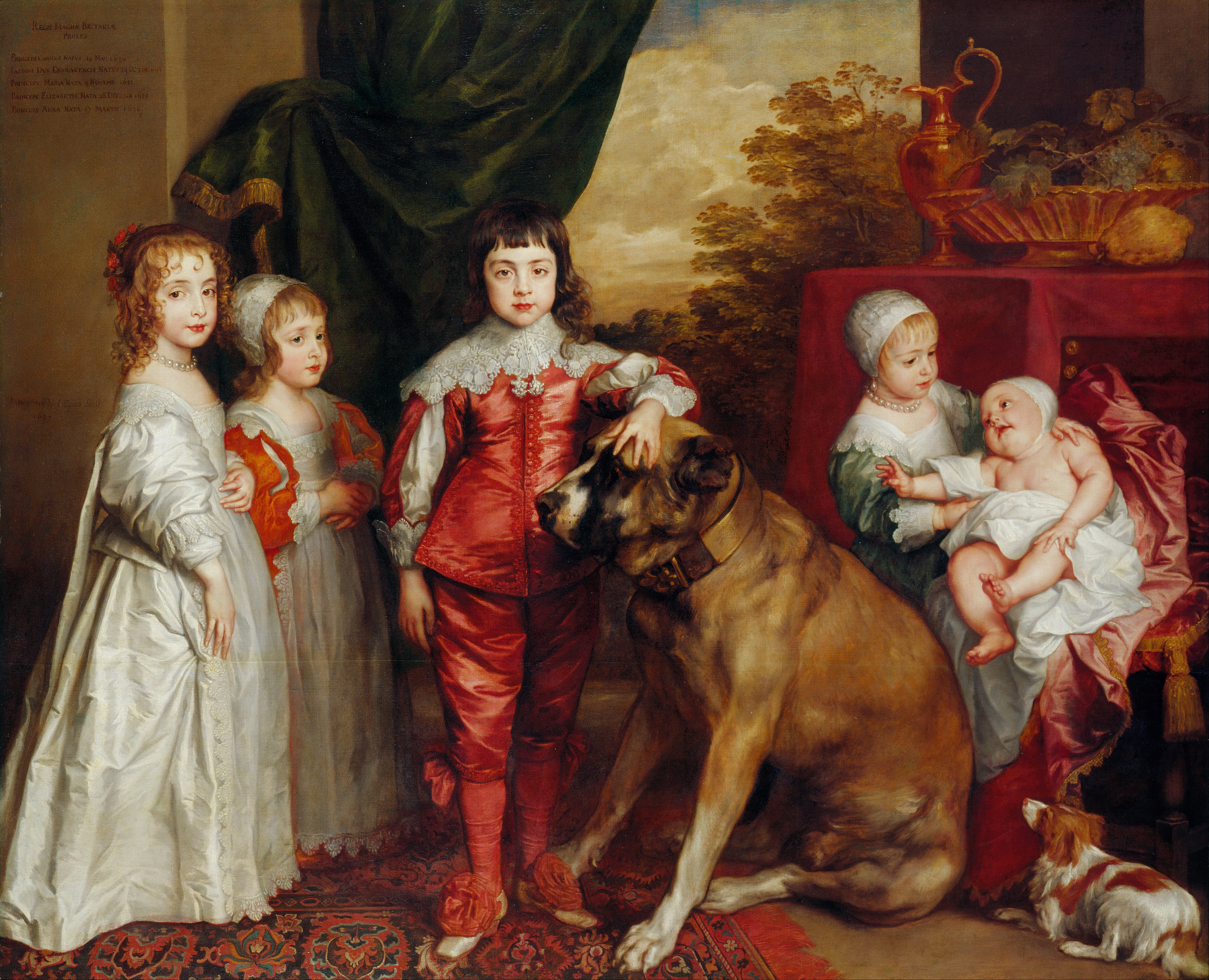
The Five Eldest Children of Charles I, Anthony van Dyck, 1637. Oil on canvas, Royal Collection, London.

The Graham Children invited comparison with Anthony van Dyck's The Five Eldest Children of Charles I (1637). Both included animals for comic effect and took care to give each child an individual character. However, while Van Dyck (1599–1641) was commissioned by King Charles I to paint royalty, Hogarth's portraits were mainly of the rising middle class, and he never broke through to become a court painter. Unlike the children of Charles I, there is nothing aristocratic about The Graham Children, despite their affluence, and the allusion to the earlier work may have been a deliberate attempt by Hogarth to flatter his middle class client.

== Hogarth's paintings of children ==
From around the 1730s, Hogarth developed a genre of playful conversation pieces far removed from the grand history paintings that he really wanted to produce but for which he had no commissions. He was working against a background of what has been called a "new world" of childhood where the attitude to children was becoming more liberal. Family groups in painting became less formal and began to show parents and children enjoying recreational activities together. Portraits of individual children became more common than they had been in the seventeenth century and the idea of the "innocence" of childhood began to take root based on the view that the child was an uncorrupted blank slate as advocated by John Locke in his book Some Thoughts Concerning Education (1693). If the child was now innocent, however, the picture remained the product of a commercial transaction between the client and the artist and continued to fulfil a social function of demonstrating the happy family life and social status enjoyed by the customer. It also stood in a tradition of portrait painting of adults and children that had well established conventions.

In 1730, Hogarth had produced the "before and after" pair The House of Cards and The Tea Party where various minor mishaps occur relating to a house of cards and a doll's tea party. Numerous clues in both works suggest a more serious message about broken marriage hopes and loss but the full facts are not known.

The Cholmondeley Family of 1732 also included similar ingredients of impending disaster as a playful child goes to push over a pile of books while the older generation sit by, frozen, to be reanimated when the books fall. But in this work it is the mother who is included despite having died prior. Well stocked bookcases line the background which the adults can use to civilise the wild children.

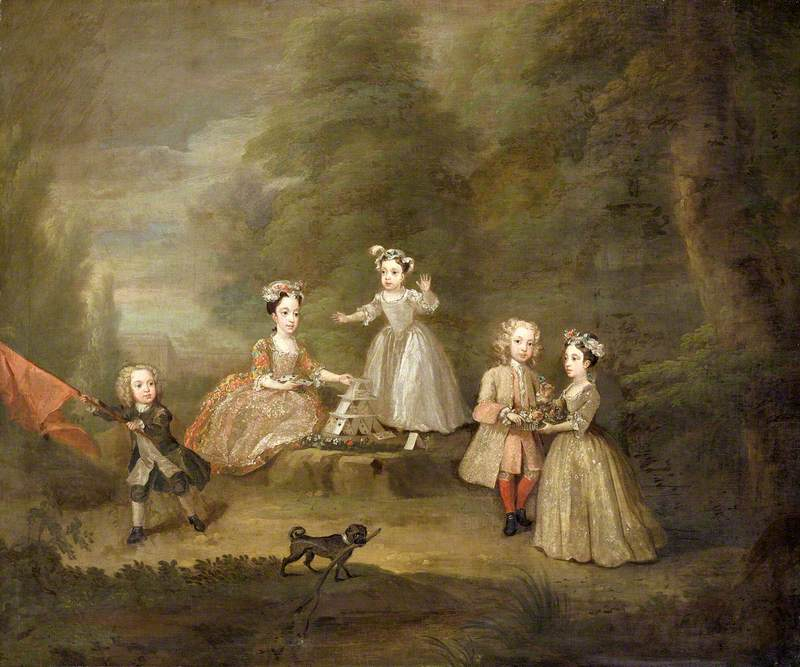
The House of Cards, William Hogarth, 1730. Oil on canvas, National Museum Cardiff.

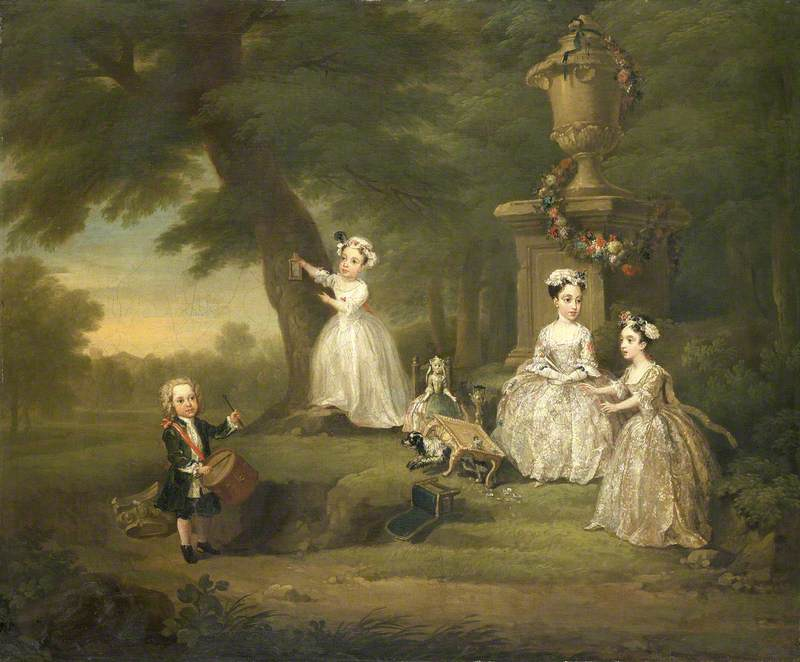
The Tea Party, William Hogarth, 1730. Oil on canvas, National Museum Cardiff.

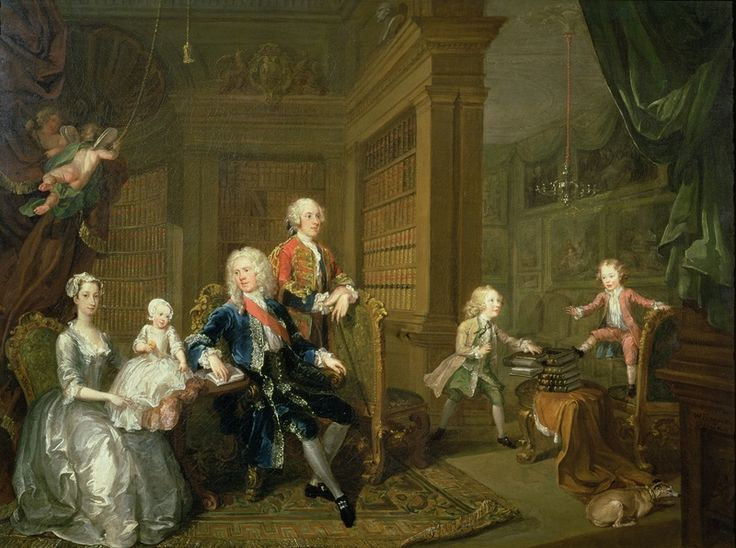
The Cholmondeley Family, William Hogarth, 1732. Oil on canvas, National Gallery, London.

== See also ==
- List of works by William Hogarth
