= Thomas Robert Malthus =

English Christian priest and political economist (1766–1834)

The Reverend Thomas Robert Malthus FRS
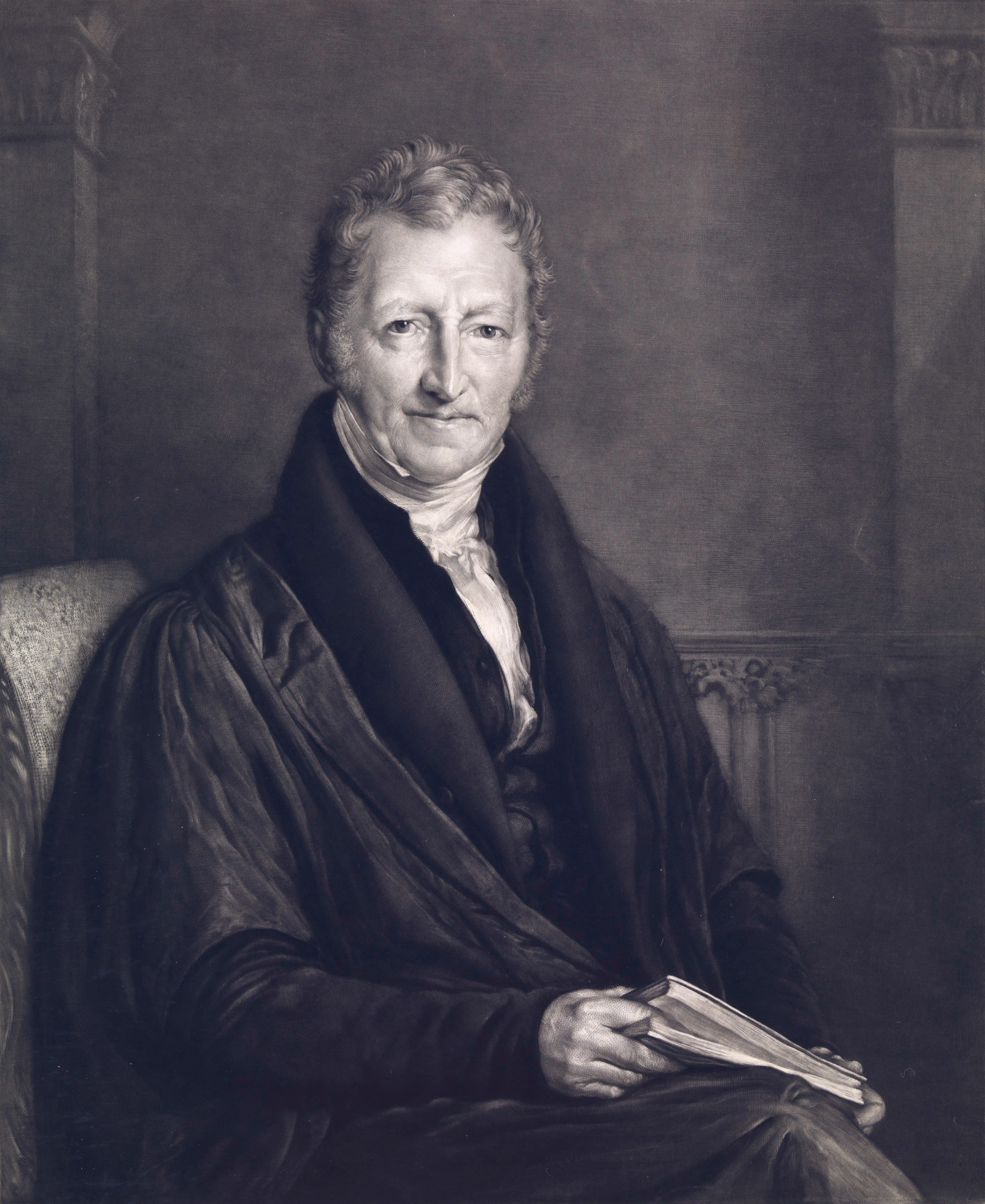
- Malthus in 1834
- Born: 13/14 February 1766; Westcott, Surrey, England
- Died: 29 December 1834 (aged 68); Bath, Somerset, England
- Spouse: Harriet Eckersall (m. 1804)
- Children: 3

Academic background
- Education: Jesus College, Cambridge (MA)
- Influences: David Ricardo; William Godwin; Adam Smith; David Hume; Edward Gibbon; Voltaire; Jean-Jaques Rousseau; Jean Charles Léonard de Sismondi

Academic work
- Discipline: Demography; macroeconomics
- School or tradition: Classical economics
- Notable works: An Essay on the Principle of Population
- Notable ideas: Malthusian growth model

Thomas Robert Malthus (/ˈmælθəs/; 13/14 February 1766 – 29 December 1834) was an English economist, Christian priest, and scholar influential in the fields of political economy and demography.

In his 1798 book An Essay on the Principle of Population, Malthus observed that an increase in a nation's food production improved the well-being of the population, but the improvement was temporary because it led to population growth, which in turn restored the original per capita production level. In other words, humans had a propensity to use abundance for population growth rather than for maintaining a high standard of living, a view and stance that has become known as the "Malthusian trap" or the "Malthusian spectre." Populations had a tendency to grow until the lower class suffered hardship, want, and greater susceptibility to war, famine, and disease, a pessimistic view that is sometimes referred to as a Malthusian catastrophe. Malthus wrote in opposition to the popular view in 18th-century Europe that saw society as improving and in principle as perfectible.

Malthus considered population growth as inevitable whenever conditions improved thereby precluding real progress towards a utopian society: "The power of population is indefinitely greater than the power in the earth to produce subsistence for man." As an Anglican cleric, he saw this situation as divinely imposed to teach virtuous behavior. Malthus wrote that "the increase of population is necessarily limited by subsistence," "population does invariably increase when the means of subsistence increase," and "the superior power of population repress by moral restraint, vice, and misery."

Malthus criticised the Poor Laws for leading to inflation rather than improving the well-being of the poor. He supported taxes on grain imports (the Corn Laws). His views became influential and controversial across economic, political, social, and scientific thought. Pioneers of evolutionary biology read him, notably Charles Darwin and Alfred Russel Wallace. U.S. Founding Fathers and Presidents Thomas Jefferson and James Madison read Malthus. Malthus's failure to predict the Industrial Revolution was a frequent criticism of his theories. Malthus laid the "theoretical foundation of the conventional wisdom that has dominated the debate, both scientifically and ideologically, on global hunger and famines for almost two centuries."

== Early life and education ==
Thomas Robert Malthus was the sixth of seven children of Daniel Malthus and Henrietta Catherine, daughter of Daniel Graham, apothecary to kings George II and George III, and granddaughter of Thomas Graham, apothecary to kings George I and George II. Henrietta was depicted alongside her siblings in William Hogarth's painting, The Graham Children (1742). Malthus was born at The Rookery, a "small elegant mansion" at Westcott, near Dorking in Surrey, which his father had bought—at that time called Chertgate Farm—and converted into "a gentleman's seat"; the family sold it in 1768 and moved to "a less extensive establishment at Albury, not far from Guildford". Malthus had a cleft lip and palate which affected his speech; such birth defects had occurred in previous generations of his family. His friend, the social theorist Harriet Martineau, who was hard of hearing, nevertheless stated that due to his sonorous voice he was the only person she could hear well without her ear trumpet. William Petersen and John Maynard Keynes describe Daniel Malthus as "a gentleman of good family and independent means [...] [and] a friend of David Hume and Jean-Jacques Rousseau". Daniel Malthus was son of Sydenham Malthus, who was a clerk of Chancery and director of the South Sea Company; he was also "proprietor of several landed properties in the Home Counties and Cambridgeshire". Sydenham Malthus's father, Daniel, had been apothecary to King William and later to Queen Anne; Daniel's father, Rev. Robert Malthus, was appointed vicar of Northolt, Middlesex (now West London) under the regicide Cromwell, but "evicted at the Restoration"; he was described as "an ancient divine, a man of strong reason, and mighty in the Scriptures, of great eloquence and fervour, though defective in elocution", due to "a very great impediment in his utterance" which has been concluded to be likely to have been a cleft palate. The young Malthus received his education at the Warrington Academy from 1782, where he was taught by Gilbert Wakefield. Warrington was a dissenting academy, which closed in 1783. Malthus continued for a period to be tutored by Wakefield at the latter's home in Bramcote, Nottinghamshire.

Malthus entered Jesus College, Cambridge, in 1784. While there, he took prizes in English declamation, Latin and Greek, and graduated with honours, Ninth Wrangler in mathematics. His tutor was William Frend. He took the MA degree in 1791, and was elected a Fellow of Jesus College two years later. In 1789, he took orders in the Church of England, and became a curate at Oakwood Chapel (also Okewood) in the parish of Wotton, Surrey.

== Population growth ==
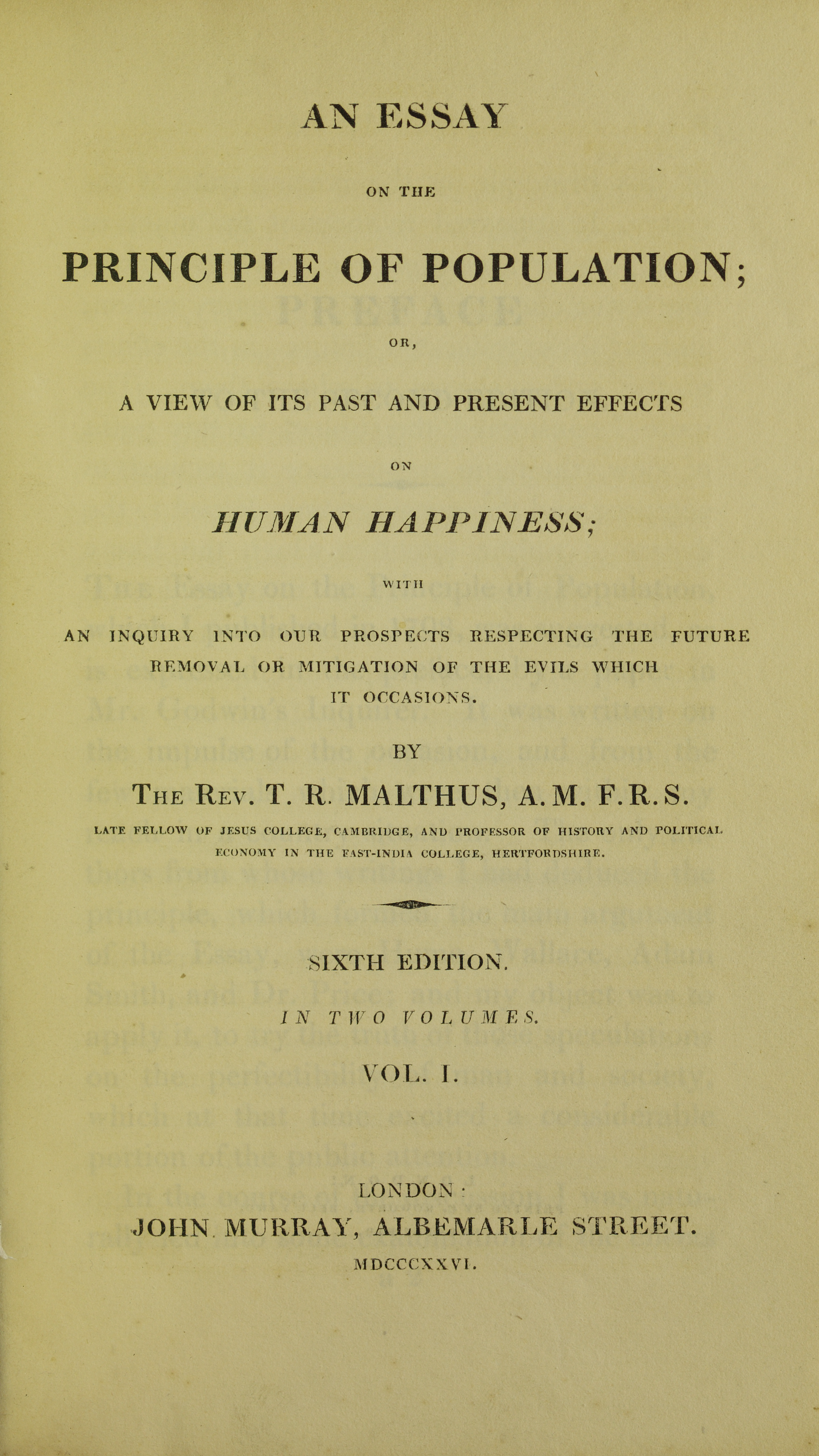
Essay on the principle of population, 1826

Malthus came to prominence for his 1798 publication, An Essay on the Principle of Population. He wrote the original text in reaction to the optimism of his father and his father's associates (notably Jean-Jacques Rousseau) regarding the future improvement of society. He also constructed his case as a specific response to writings of William Godwin and of the Marquis de Condorcet (1743–1794). Many questioned and criticised the book. In response, he published six revisions of An Essay on the Principle of Population, before 1826. Each time he updated the book to incorporate new material, to address criticism, and to convey changes in his own perspectives on the subject.

In the decades following its publication, the Essay gave rise to the Malthusian controversy in which attention was focused on the birth rate and marriage rates. Many years later the neo-Malthusian controversy saw a similar central role assigned to the numbers of children born.

Malthusian theory is a way to explain how population and food production expand, stating that food production grows arithmetically while the population grows exponentially. The theory is producing a strident debate on the relevance of Malthusian theory in the present world.

The Malthusian theory is flawed in various ways. First, the theory disregards technological advancement. Food production has grown as a result of technological advancements such as genetically modified organisms (GMOs).

Second, the mathematical model employed to formulate the hypothesis is not widely applicable since it was based on England's situation. If the population/food modeling examines Australia, it may foretell that food production will exceed population increase. The Malthusian hypothesis is also limited by social change about family size, as some people prefer a smaller family owing to economic restrictions.

Food production can outpace population expansion, as was seen in the industrial revolution. The theory is also limited by its basis in the belief that overall income is a key factor of population health, implying that wealthy countries will have solutions for their rapidly rising populations. An expanding population can be considered as an increase of available human capacity for increasing food production. The Malthusian theory is based on the rule of decreasing returns in the area of food production. That limits its applicability.

Malthus's theory fails to see the effect if birth rates are larger or smaller than death rates. That hampers its application, because it was possible that a population with many births was not increasing quicker than the rate of food production due to many people dying.

== Travel and further career ==
In 1799, Malthus made a European tour with William Otter, a close college friend, travelling part of the way with Edward Daniel Clarke and John Marten Cripps, visiting Germany, Scandinavia and Russia. Malthus used the tour to gather population data. Otter later wrote a Memoir of Malthus for the second (1836) edition of his Principles of Political Economy. During the Peace of Amiens of 1802 he travelled to France and Switzerland, in a party that included his relation and future wife Harriet.

In 1803, he became rector of Walesby, Lincolnshire.

In 1805, Malthus became Professor of History and Political Economy at the East India Company College in Hertfordshire. His students affectionately referred to him as "Pop", "Population", or "web-toe" Malthus.

Near the end of 1817, the proposed appointment of Graves Champney Haughton to the college was made a pretext by Randle Jackson and Joseph Hume to launch an attempt to close it down. Malthus wrote a pamphlet defending the college, which was reprieved by the East India Company within the same year, 1817.

In 1818, Malthus became a Fellow of the Royal Society.

== Malthus–Ricardo debate on political economy ==
During the 1820s, a setpiece intellectual discussion took place among the exponents of political economy, often called the Malthus–Ricardo debate after its leading figures, Malthus and theorist of free trade David Ricardo, both of whom had written books with the title Principles of Political Economy. Under examination were the nature and methods of political economy itself, while it was simultaneously under attack from others. The roots of the debate were in the previous decade. In The Nature of Rent (1815), Malthus had dealt with economic rent, a major concept in classical economics. Ricardo defined a theory of rent in his Principles of Political Economy and Taxation (1817): he regarded rent as value in excess of real production—something caused by ownership rather than by free trade. Rent therefore represented a kind of negative money that landlords could pull out of the production of the land, by means of its scarcity. Contrary to this concept, Malthus proposed rent to be a kind of economic surplus.

The debate developed over the economic concept of a general glut, and the possibility of failure of Say's law. Malthus laid importance on economic development and the persistence of disequilibrium. The context was the post-war depression; Malthus had a supporter in William Blake, in denying that capital accumulation (saving) was always good in such circumstances, and John Stuart Mill attacked Blake on the fringes of the debate.

Ricardo corresponded with Malthus from 1817 about his Principles. He was drawn into considering political economy in a less restricted sense, which might be adapted to legislation and its multiple objectives, by the thought of Malthus. In Principles of Political Economy (1820) and elsewhere, Malthus addressed the tension, amounting to conflict he saw between a narrow view of political economy and the broader moral and political plane. Leslie Stephen wrote:

If Malthus and Ricardo differed, it was a difference of men who accepted the same first principles. They both professed to interpret Adam Smith as the true prophet, and represented different shades of opinion rather than diverging sects.

It is now considered that the different purposes seen by Malthus and Ricardo for political economy affected their technical discussion, and contributed to the lack of compatible definitions. For example, Jean-Baptiste Say used a definition of production based on goods and services and so queried the restriction of Malthus to "goods" alone.

In terms of public policy, Malthus was a supporter of the protectionist Corn Laws from the end of the Napoleonic Wars. He emerged as the only economist of note to support duties on imported grain. By encouraging domestic production, Malthus argued, the Corn Laws would guarantee British self-sufficiency in food.

== Later life ==
Malthus was a founding member in 1821 of the Political Economy Club, where John Cazenove tended to be his ally against Ricardo and Mill. He was elected in the beginning of 1824 as one of the ten royal associates of the Royal Society of Literature. He was also one of the first fellows of the Statistical Society, founded in March 1834. In 1827 he gave evidence to a committee of the House of Commons on emigration.

In 1827, he published Definitions in Political Economy The first chapter put forth "Rules for the Definition and Application of Terms in Political Economy". In chapter 10, the penultimate chapter, he presented 60 numbered paragraphs putting forth terms and their definitions that he proposed should be used in discussing political economy following those rules. This collection of terms and definitions is remarkable for two reasons: first, Malthus was the first economist to explicitly organize, define, and publish his terms as a coherent glossary of defined terms; and second, his definitions were for the most part well-formed definitional statements. Between these chapters, he criticised several contemporary economists—Jean-Baptiste Say, David Ricardo, James Mill, John Ramsay McCulloch, and Samuel Bailey—for sloppiness in choosing, attaching meaning to, and using their technical terms.

McCulloch was the editor of The Scotsman of Edinburgh and replied cuttingly in a review printed on the front page of his newspaper in March 1827. He implied that Malthus wanted to dictate terms and theories to other economists. McCulloch clearly took personal offence and his review of Definitions is largely a bitter defence of his own Principles of Political Economy, and his counter-attack "does little credit to his reputation", being largely "personal derogation" of Malthus. The purpose of Malthus's Definitions was terminological clarity, and Malthus discussed appropriate terms, their definitions, and their use by himself and his contemporaries. This motivation of Malthus's work was disregarded by McCulloch, who responded that there was nothing to be gained "by carping at definitions, and quibbling about the meaning to be attached to" words. Given that statement, it is not surprising that McCulloch's review failed to address the rules of chapter 1 and did not discuss the definitions of chapter 10; he also barely mentioned Malthus's critiques of other writers.

In spite of this and in the wake of McCulloch's scathing review, the reputation of Malthus as economist dropped away for the rest of his life. On the other hand, Malthus did have supporters, including Thomas Chalmers, some of the Oriel Noetics, Richard Jones and William Whewell from Cambridge.

Malthus died suddenly of heart disease on 29 December 1834 at his father-in-law's house. He was buried in Bath Abbey. His portrait, and descriptions by contemporaries, present him as tall and good-looking, but with a cleft lip and palate.

== Family ==
On 13 March 1804, Thomas Malthus married Harriet Eckersall, the eldest daughter of his first cousins John and Catherine Eckersall, who lived near Bath. Harriet became well-known at Haileybury College for hosting gatherings of notable scientists; eleven years younger than Thomas, she survived him by thirty years, remarrying after his death.

The couple had a son, Henry, and two daughters, Emily and Lucille. Henry, the eldest, became vicar of Effingham, Surrey in 1835 and of Donnington, Sussex in 1837; he married Sofia Otter, daughter of Bishop William Otter and died in August 1882, aged 76. Emily, the middle child, died in 1885, outliving her parents and siblings. Lucille, the youngest, died unmarried and childless in 1825, at age 17.

== An Essay on the Principle of Population ==
Malthus argued in his Essay (1798) that population growth generally expanded in times and in regions of plenty until the size of the population relative to the primary resources caused distress:

Yet in all societies, even those that are most vicious, the tendency to a virtuous attachment [i.e., marriage] is so strong that there is a constant effort towards an increase of population. This constant effort as constantly tends to subject the lower classes of the society to distress and to prevent any great permanent amelioration of their condition.

— Malthus, T. R. 1798. An Essay on the Principle of Population. Chapter II, p. 18 in Oxford World's Classics reprint.

Malthus argued that two types of checks hold population within resource limits: positive checks, which raise the death rate; and preventive ones, which lower the birth rate. The positive checks include hunger, disease and war; the preventive checks: birth control, postponement of marriage and celibacy.

The rapid increase in the global population of the past century exemplifies Malthus' predicted population patterns; it also appears to describe socio-demographic dynamics of complex pre-industrial societies. These findings are the basis for neo-Malthusian modern mathematical models of long-term historical dynamics.

Malthus wrote that in a period of resource abundance, a population could double in 25 years. However, the margin of abundance could not be sustained as population grew, leading to checks on population growth:

If the subsistence for man that the earth affords was to be increased every twenty-five years by a quantity equal to what the whole world at present produces, this would allow the power of production in the earth to be absolutely unlimited, and its ratio of increase much greater than we can conceive that any possible exertions of mankind could make it ... yet still the power of population being a power of a superior order, the increase of the human species can only be kept commensurate to the increase of the means of subsistence by the constant operation of the strong law of necessity acting as a check upon the greater power.

— Malthus T. R. 1798. An Essay on the Principle of Population. Chapter 2, p. 8

In later editions of his essay, Malthus clarified his view that if society relied on human misery to limit population growth, then sources of misery (e.g., hunger, disease, and war) would inevitably afflict society, as would volatile economic cycles. On the other hand, "preventive checks" to population that limited birthrates, such as later marriages, could ensure a higher standard of living for all, while also increasing economic stability. Regarding possibilities for freeing man from these limits, Malthus argued against a variety of imaginable solutions, such as the notion that agricultural improvements could expand without limit.

Of the relationship between population and economics, Malthus wrote that when the population of laborers grows faster than the production of food, real wages fall because the growing population causes the cost of living (i.e., the cost of food) to go up. Difficulties of raising a family eventually reduce the rate of population growth, until the falling population again leads to higher real wages.

In the second and subsequent editions Malthus put more emphasis on moral restraint as the best means of easing the poverty of the lower classes."

The first edition of the Essay on the Principle of Population also contained a sophisticated theory of mind which attempted to explain human behaviour. This materialist conception of mind emphasised its corporeal and irrational nature which operated according to an economy of desire. Malthus believed that innate bodily desires, passions, and impulses made demands on the organism to be satiated which in turn gave rise to the mental apparatus. He excised his theory of mind from all future editions of the Essay following accusations of materialism and atheism.

=== Editions and versions ===
- 1798: An Essay on the Principle of Population, as it affects the future improvement of society with remarks on the speculations of Mr. Godwin, M. Condorcet, and other writers.. Anonymously published.
- 1803: Second and much enlarged edition: An Essay on the Principle of Population; or, a view of its past and present effects on human happiness; with an enquiry into our prospects respecting the future removal or mitigation of the evils which it occasions. Authorship acknowledged.
- 1806, 1807, 1816 and 1826: editions 3–6, with relatively minor changes from the second edition.
- 1823: Malthus contributed the article on Population to the supplement of the Encyclopædia Britannica.
- 1830: Malthus had a long extract from the 1823 article reprinted as A summary view of the Principle of Population.

== Other works ==
=== 1800: The present high price of provisions ===
In this work, his first published pamphlet, Malthus argues against the notion prevailing in his locale that the greed of intermediaries caused the high price of provisions. Instead, Malthus says that the high price stems from the Poor Laws, which "increase the parish allowances in proportion to the price of corn." Thus, given a limited supply, the Poor Laws force up the price of daily necessities. However, he concludes by saying that in time of scarcity such Poor Laws, by raising the price of corn more evenly, actually produce a beneficial effect.

=== 1814: Observations on the effects of the Corn Laws ===
Although government in Britain had regulated the prices of grain, the Corn Laws originated in 1815. At the end of the Napoleonic Wars that year, Parliament passed legislation banning the importation of foreign corn into Britain until domestic corn cost 80 shillings per quarter. The high price caused the cost of food to increase and caused distress among the working classes in the towns. It led to serious rioting in London and to the Peterloo Massacre in Manchester in 1819.

In this pamphlet, printed during the parliamentary discussion, Malthus tentatively supported the free-traders. He argued that given the increasing cost of growing British corn, advantages accrued from supplementing it from cheaper foreign sources.

=== 1820: Principles of political economy ===
Title page for the second edition of Principles of Political Economy (1836).

In 1820 Malthus published Principles of Political Economy. (A second edition was posthumously published in 1836.) Malthus intended this work to rival Ricardo's Principles (1817). It, and his 1827 Definitions in political economy, defended Sismondi's views on "general glut" rather than Say's law, which in effect states "there can be no general glut".

=== Other publications ===
- 1807. A letter to Samuel Whitbread, Esq. M.P. on his proposed Bill for the Amendment of the Poor Laws. Johnson and Hatchard, London.
- 1808. Spence on Commerce. Edinburgh Review 11, January, 429–448.
- 1808. Newneham and others on the state of Ireland. Edinburgh Review 12, July, 336–355.
- 1809. Newneham on the state of Ireland, Edinburgh Review 14 April, 151–170.
- 1811. Depreciation of paper currency. Edinburgh Review 17, February, 340–372.
- 1812. Pamphlets on the bullion question. Edinburgh Review 18, August, 448–470.
- 1813. A letter to the Rt. Hon. Lord Grenville. Johnson, London.
- 1817. Statement respecting the East-India College. Murray, London.
- 1821. Godwin on Malthus. Edinburgh Review 35, July, 362–377.
- 1823. The Measure of Value, stated and illustrated
- 1823. Tooke – On high and low prices. Quarterly Review, 29 (57), April, 214–239.
- 1824. Political economy. Quarterly Review 30 (60), January, 297–334.
- 1829. On the measure of the conditions necessary to the supply of commodities. Transactions of the Royal Society of Literature of the United Kingdom. 1, 171–180. John Murray, London.
- 1829. On the meaning which is most usually and most correctly attached to the term Value of a Commodity. Transactions of the Royal Society of Literature of the United Kingdom. 2, 74–81. John Murray.

== Reception and influence ==
Malthus developed the theory of demand-supply mismatches that he called gluts. Discounted at the time, the theory was extended by an admirer, John Maynard Keynes.

Continuing commentary extended and expanded on Malthus's theories of the early 19th century. Writing to Ricardo in 1817, Malthus proposed that "to give full effect to the natural resources of [Ireland] a great part of the population should be swept from the soil into large manufacturing and commercial Towns."

Whitely Stokes, polymath and physician, responded with Observations on the population and resources of Ireland (1821) by the. Stokes pointed out faults in Malthus's calculations, his unlikely juxtapositions – "the possible increase of man in America" measured against "the probable increase in [food] production in Great Britain." Emphasizing the advantages mankind derives from "improved industry, improved conveyance, improvements in morals, government, and religion," Stokes argued that Ireland's difficulty lay not in the size of her population but in her indifferent governments.

== In popular culture ==
- Ebenezer Scrooge from A Christmas Carol by Charles Dickens represents the Malthusianism, famously illustrated by his explanation as to why he refuses to donate to the poor and destitute: "If they would rather die they had better do it, and decrease the surplus population". In general, Dickens illustrated some Malthusian concerns in Oliver Twist, Hard Times and other novels, and he attacked Utilitarianism and many of its proponents, like Jeremy Bentham, whom he thought of, along with Malthus, as unjust and inhumane.
- In Brave New World by Aldous Huxley, a dystopian novel set in a World State which controls reproduction, women wear the "Malthusian belt", containing "the regulation supply of contraceptives".
- In the musical Urinetown, written by Greg Kotis and Mark Hollmann, the characters live in a society in which a fee must be paid in order to urinate, for a drought has made water incredibly scarce. A revolution starts with a "pee for free" agenda. At the end of the show, the revolution wins but the characters end up dying because water was not being conserved, unlike when the 'pee fee' was in place. The penultimate line is "Hail Malthus!"
- In the film Avengers: Infinity War, the main villain called Thanos appears to be motivated by Malthusian views about population growth. He commits universal mass genocide known as The Blip.

== Epitaph ==
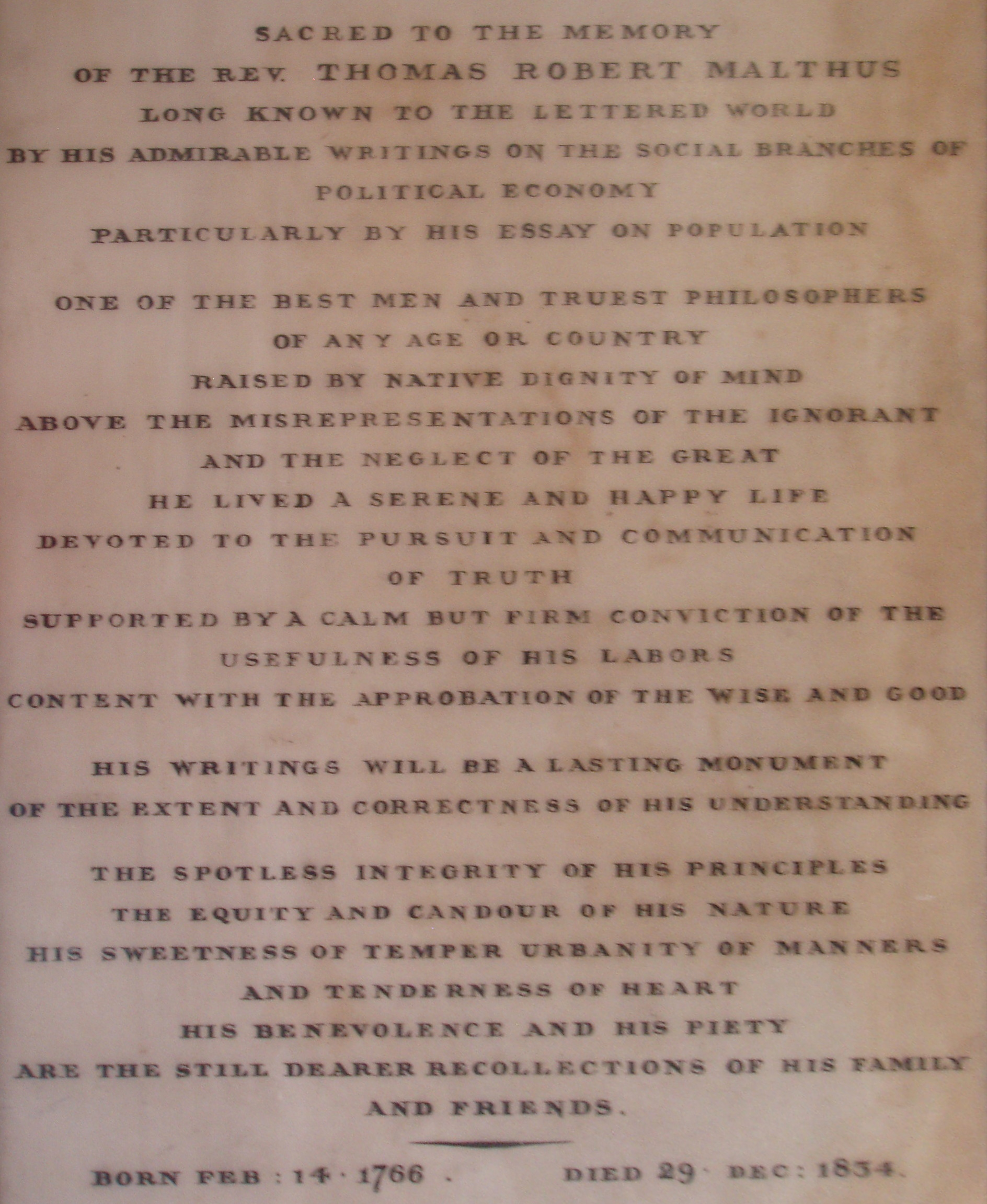
The epitaph of Malthus just inside the entrance to Bath Abbey

The epitaph of Malthus in Bath Abbey reads [with commas inserted for clarity]:

Sacred to the memory of the Rev THOMAS ROBERT MALTHUS, long known to the lettered world by his admirable writings on the social branches of political economy, particularly by his essay on population.

One of the best men and truest philosophers of any age or country, raised by native dignity of mind above the misrepresentations of the ignorant and the neglect of the great, he lived a serene and happy life devoted to the pursuit and communication of truth, supported by a calm but firm conviction of the usefulness of his labors, content with the approbation of the wise and good.

His writings will be a lasting monument of the extent and correctness of his understanding.

The spotless integrity of his principles, the equity and candour of his nature, his sweetness of temper, urbanity of manners and tenderness of heart, his benevolence and his piety are the still dearer recollections of his family and friends.

Born 14 February 1766 – Died 29 December 1834.

== See also ==
- Cornucopianism, a counter-Malthusian school of thought
- Exponential growth
- Food race, a related idea from Daniel Quinn
- The Limits to Growth, from the Club of Rome
- Hong Liangji, a similar theorist in China, contemporary with Malthus
- Human overpopulation
- Malthusian equilibrium
- Malthusian growth model
- Malthusian trap
- Malthusianism
- National Security Study Memorandum 200 Henry Kissinger's 1974 study of "Implications of Worldwide Population Growth for U.S. Security and Overseas Interests"
- Observations Concerning the Increase of Mankind, Peopling of Countries, etc.
- World population
