= The Elms, Hampstead =

Coordinates: 51°34′02″N 0°10′31″W

The Elms is a house on Spaniard's Road in Hampstead in the London Borough of Camden. It has been listed Grade II on the National Heritage List for England (NHLE) since April 1981.

The house was built around 1875 and most likely incorporates an earlier building of which no trace is internally visible. It is built from red brick with a roof of Welsh slate. It was owned from 1894 to 1908 by the art collector and dealer Joseph Joel Duveen. T.E. Collcutt may have been employed by Duveen to embellish the house in the 1890s.
