= 12 West 56th Street =

Building in Manhattan, New York

Harry B. Hollins Residence
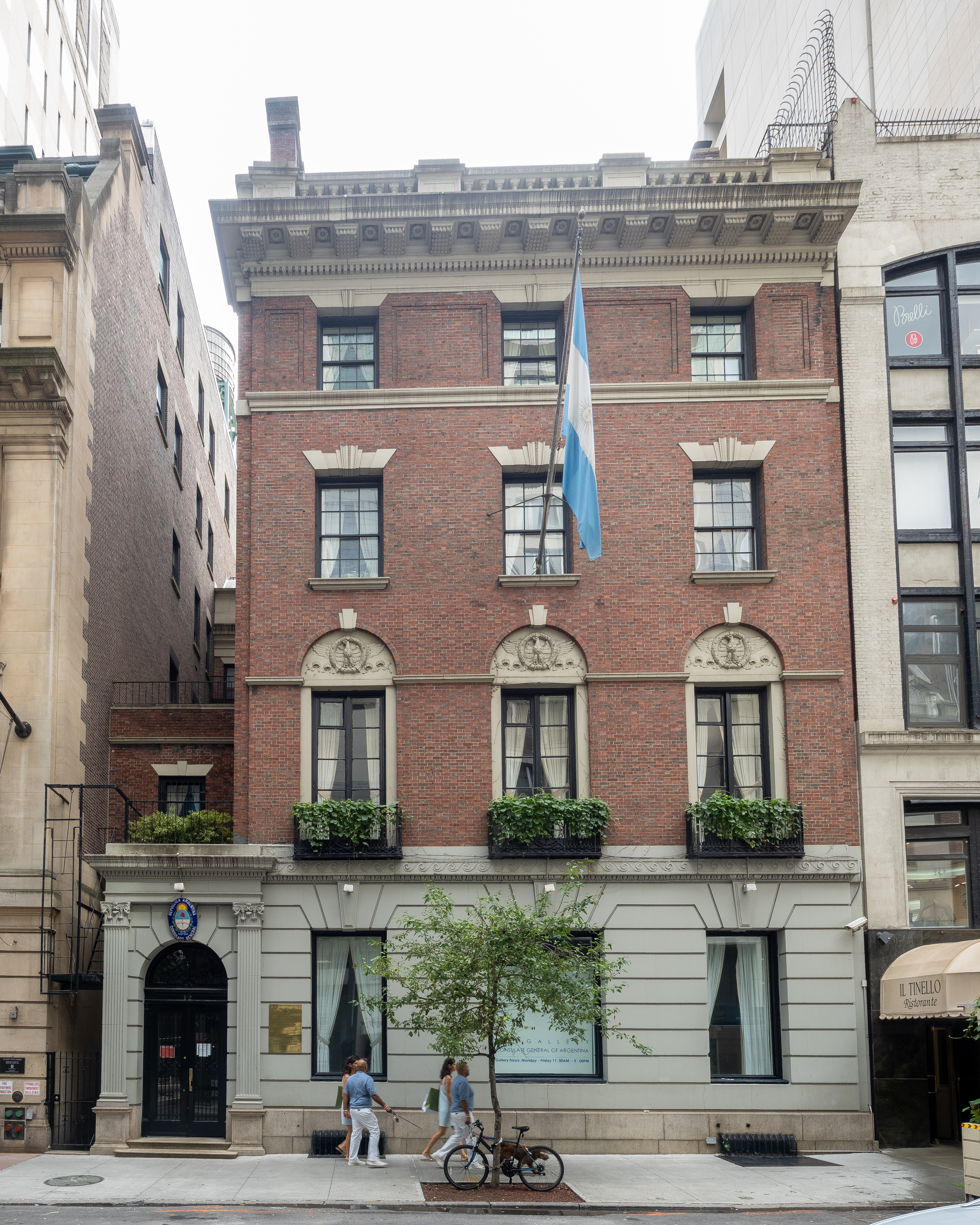
- Interactive map of the Harry B. Hollins Residence area

General information
- Architectural style: Georgian Revival
- Location: 12 West 56th Street, Manhattan, New York, US
- Coordinates: 40°45′45″N 73°58′32″W
- Construction started: 1899
- Completed: 1901
- Client: Harry B. Hollins
- Owner: Government of Argentina

Technical details
- Floor count: 4 (plus attic)

Design and construction
- Architect: McKim, Mead & White

New York City Landmark
- Designated: June 19, 1984
- Reference no.: 1266

12 West 56th Street (originally the Harry B. Hollins Residence) is a consular building in the Midtown Manhattan neighborhood of New York City, housing the Consulate General of Argentina in New York City. It is along 56th Street's southern sidewalk between Fifth Avenue and Sixth Avenue. The four-and-a-half story building was designed by McKim, Mead & White in the Georgian Revival style. It was constructed between 1899 and 1901 as a private residence, one of several on 56th Street's "Bankers' Row".

The first floor is clad with blocks of limestone, while the other floors contain red brick trimmed with limestone. The entrance is through a central porch on the east side of the building, designed by James Edwin Ruthven Carpenter Jr. as part of an annex completed in 1924. The second floor contains French windows and the third and fourth floors contain sash windows.

The house was commissioned for stockbroker H. B. Hollins and his wife Evalina Hollins. The couple had initially planned to design their house alongside their neighbor Frederick C. Edey, at 10 West 56th Street, but the Hollinses built their house alone because a covenant temporarily prevented the Edey house from being built. The house was sold to the Calumet Club in 1914 and was used by the club until 1935. It was then used by several tenants for short terms, including Charles Joel Duveen, the International Silk Guild, and The Salvation Army. The government of Argentina has owned the building since 1947; it initially used the house as the offices of an Argentine Navy commission before opening a consulate there. The New York City Landmarks Preservation Commission designated the house as an official landmark in 1984.

== Site ==
12 West 56th Street is in the Midtown Manhattan neighborhood of New York City. It is along the southern sidewalk of 56th Street between Fifth Avenue and Sixth Avenue, with an alternate address of 14 West 56th Street. The land lot is rectangular and covers 5,000 square feet (460 m^{2}), with a frontage of 50 feet (15 m) on 56th Street and a depth of 100.42 feet (30.61 m). The building is on the same block as the 10 West 56th Street townhouse and the 712 Fifth Avenue skyscraper to the east; the Fifth Avenue Presbyterian Church to the southeast; and the townhouses at 26 and 30 West 56th Street to the west. Other nearby buildings include The Peninsula New York hotel, the University Club of New York, and the Rockefeller Apartments to the south; the Corning Glass Building to the east; Trump Tower to the northeast; and 17 West 56th Street and the Crown Building to the north.

Fifth Avenue between 42nd Street and Central Park South (59th Street) was relatively undeveloped through the late 19th century. The surrounding area was once part of the common lands of the city of New York. The Commissioners' Plan of 1811 established Manhattan's street grid with lots measuring 100 feet (30 m) deep and 25 feet (7.6 m) wide. Upscale residences were constructed around Fifth Avenue following the American Civil War. The block of 56th Street from Fifth to Sixth Avenue contained rowhouses by 1871, many of which were recessed from the lot line and had entrance stoops. By the end of the 19th century, the area had many wealthy residents, and the houses in the area were either modified or rebuilt altogether. The adjacent block of West 56th Street was developing into a "bankers' row" with the residences of Frederick C. and Birdsall Otis Edey at number 10, Henry Seligman at number 30, Edward Wasserman at number 33, and Arthur Lehman at number 31. Many of these houses persisted through the mid-20th century as part of a restaurant and retail strip.

== Architecture ==
The Hollins House at 12 West 56th Street, later the Argentinian Consulate General to New York City, was designed by McKim, Mead & White in the Federal Georgian Revival style. Of the firm's principals, Stanford White had been the most involved in the house's design. The current consular building is composed of the original residence and a 1924 annex designed by J.E.R. Carpenter on the eastern side of the house. The house is an early example of a brick Colonial Revival house in New York City with three-dimensional decorations.

12 West 56th Street was planned and constructed nearly simultaneously with the house of Frederick C. Edey at 10 West 56th Street. However, because of a covenant that temporarily halted construction at number 10, they were designed in different styles by different firms. (Note: 10 West 56th Street was designed by Warren and Wetmore in the French Renaissance Revival style with some Beaux-Arts design elements.) Of the houses' contrasting designs, Christopher Gray wrote for The New York Times in 2007: "The two houses are paired in an uneasy dance, one doing the cancan, the other a minuet."

=== Facade ===
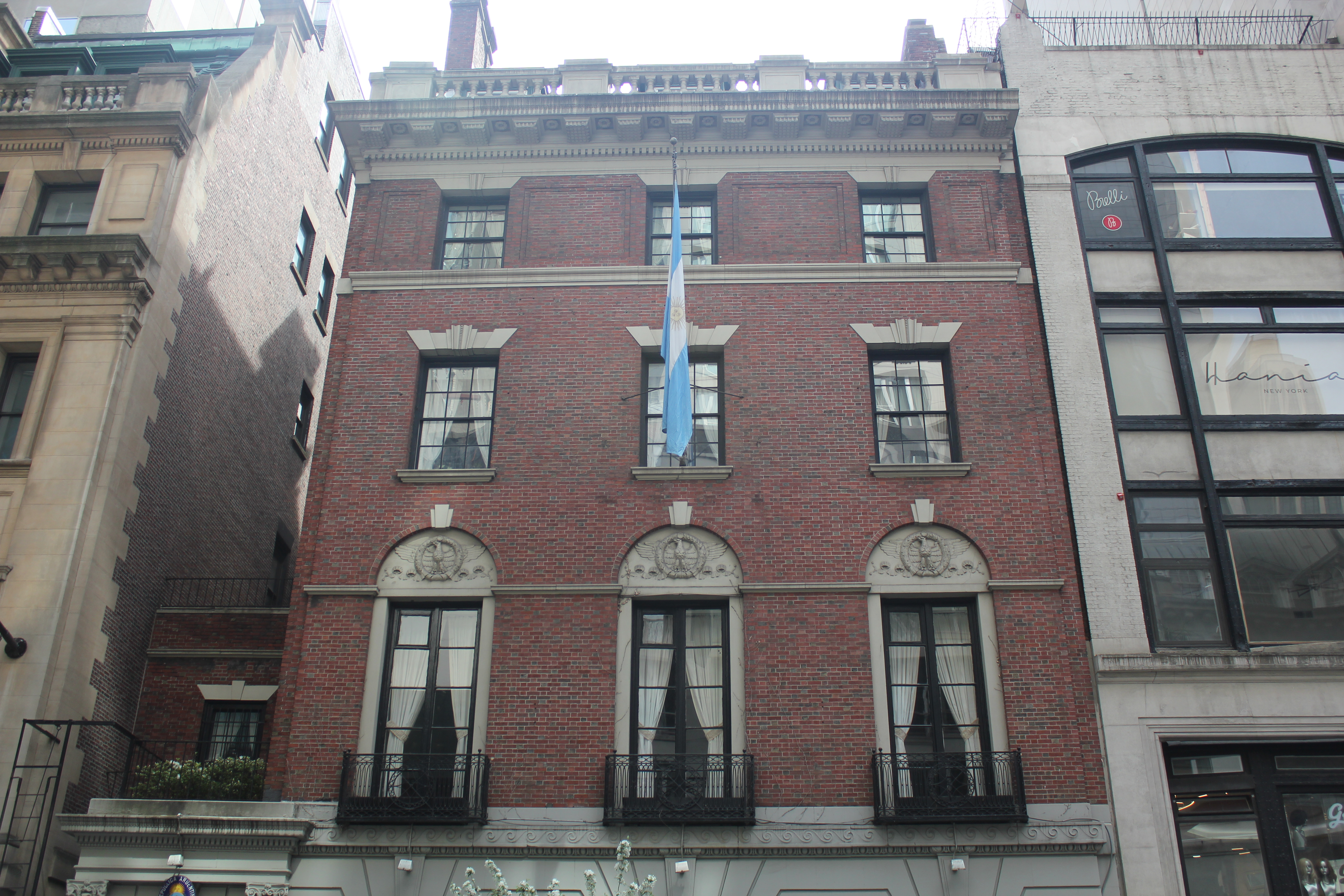
Detail of upper stories

The main portion of the building, the original residence, is at 14 West 56th Street and is four and a half stories tall. It consists of three vertical bays of windows. The first floor is clad with rusticated blocks of limestone and has three recessed windows. The center window at the first floor is wider than the other windows on that floor, as it was originally the main entrance to the house. This center opening originally had five steps leading to a portico with Doric-style columns.

The other stories on 56th Street are clad with brick. The second story has three French windows with their own iron balconies, as well as carved stone lunettes. A horizontal string course runs under the second-story lunettes and connects them. The third and fourth stories have double hung windows with splayed stone lintels, as well as a string course just below the fourth floor. The center window at the third story formerly had an iron balcony but was subsequently equipped with a flagpole and Argentine flag. Above the fourth floor is a cornice with modillions, as well as a peaked roof above it.

White had designed the building with a setback wing facing 10 West 56th Street, which had been developed nearly simultaneously. The decorative detail from the main facade was copied to the side facade, which faced a courtyard between 10 and 12 West 56th Street. On the east side of 12 West 56th Street is the two-story wing, designed for the Calumet Club. The portion of the annex facing the street contains the building's main entrance, a single-story aedicule with a metal gate inside an archway. The entrance is made of limestone and flanked by Corinthian-style fluted pilasters. The second story of the wing is slightly set back from the entrance portico.

== History ==
The house was commissioned for Harry Bowly Hollins, a financier, banker, and railroad magnate who founded the firm H.B. Hollins & Co in 1878. His partner at the firm was Frederick Edey, a stockbroker who initially worked for Charles C. Edey & Sons before becoming a partner at H.B. Hollins & Co. from 1886 to 1892. Hollins and Edey commuted from Long Island to Midtown together, and their firm worked with J.P. Morgan & Co. Harry B. Hollins was married to Evelina Meserole Knapp Hollins, and the couple had five children: McKim, John K., Gerald V., Harry B. Jr., and Marion.

=== Residence ===
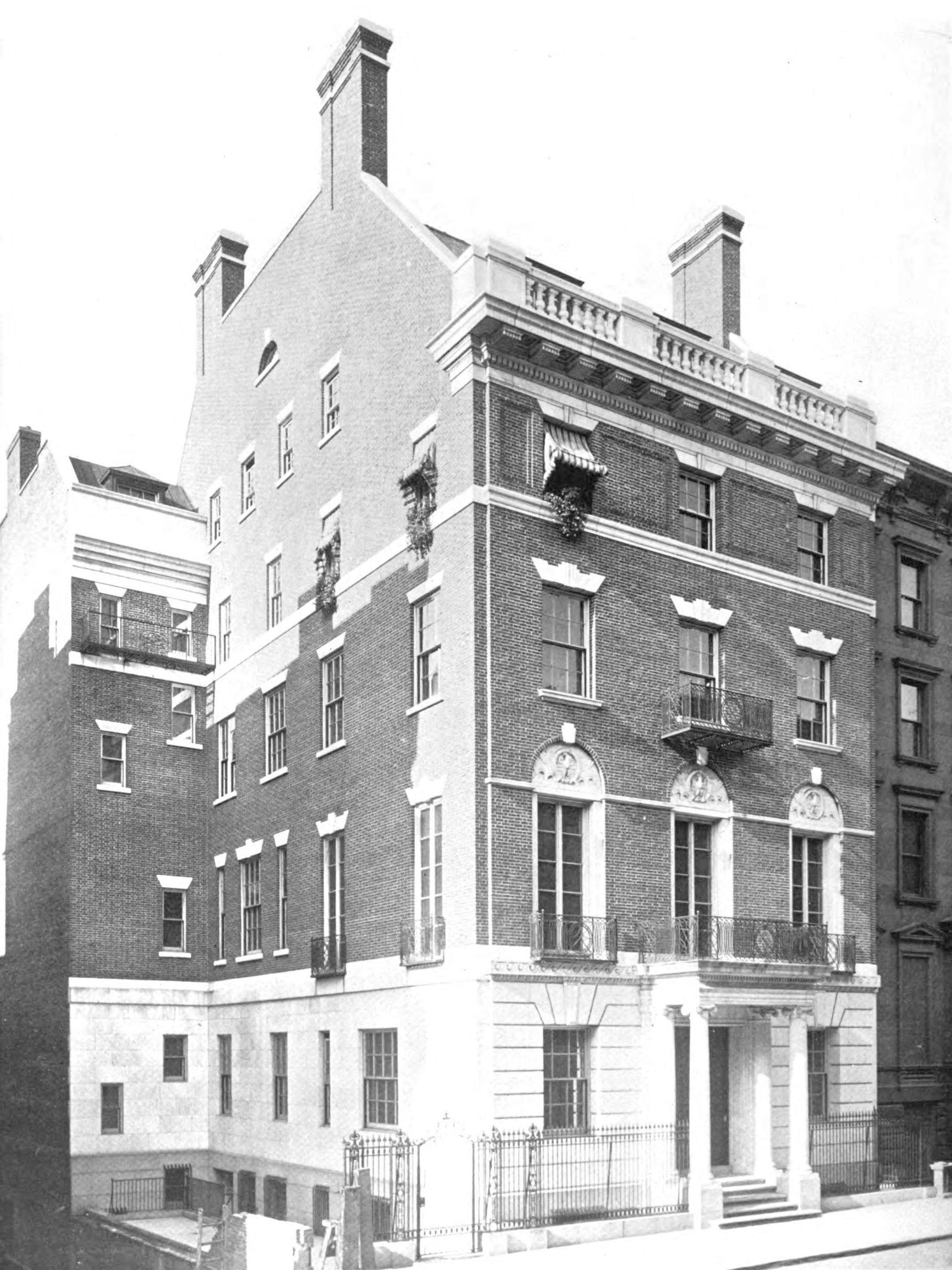
Original appearance of the house in 1901

In February 1899, Hollins bought a 75-by-100-foot (23 by 30 m) lot at 10-14 West 56th Street, on its southern sidewalk about 250 feet (76 m) west of Fifth Avenue. Hollins sold the easternmost 25 feet (7.6 m) of the lot later the same month. On the remainder of the site, he planned to build a 38-foot-wide (12 m) residence, with a gap between his house and the lot he had just sold. Edey was recorded as the buyer of the 25-foot-wide lot at 10 West 56th Street. These were the only two vacant lots on the block at the time. Hollins and Edey agreed to construct their houses jointly and build their respective houses to the lot line. Hollins hired McKim, Mead & White to design his house, but an 1881 covenant prevented Edey from building a structure out to the lot line until 1901. As a result, Hollins was able to start work on his house right away. Edey had to wait two years and ultimately hired Warren and Wetmore instead.

The Hollins family moved into the house when it was completed in 1901. The Hollins property extended south to 55th Street, abutting the Fifth Avenue Presbyterian Church. The 55th Street portion of the property included a collection of horse stables at 13-17 West 55th Street, which had been used by newspaper publisher Robert Bonner. The Hollins family officially lived in Islip, Long Island, at least according to a 1905 census conducted by the New York state government. The Islip house, Meadow Farm, was the Hollins family's country residence, while the 12 West 56th Street house was their city residence. Leland Roth writes that McKim, Mead & White made renovations to the house in 1903. However, the New York City Landmarks Preservation Commission (LPC) was unable to find records of any alterations made in 1903. Edey's house was completed around the same time. Over the next decade, the Edey and Hollins families did not host any events together, and neither The Brooklyn Daily Eagle nor The New York Times made any mention of the two houses as a pair.

The 55th Street horse stables were sold in October 1913 to a developer who planned to raze the stables for apartments. The same month, Harry B. Hollins leased the house to Vincent Astor and his mother Mrs. John Astor as a winter residence at a total rental of $25,000. The Hollins family fled to the Gotham Hotel (now the Peninsula) around that time. In their departure, the Hollins family had left the house fully furnished. Shortly afterward came the failure of H.B. Hollins and Company, which had $5 million in debt when it was forced into bankruptcy on November 13. Ultimately, the Hollins family moved to Bay Shore on Long Island. The Astors' lease in the former Hollins house expired at the end of May 1914. By then, the surrounding neighborhood was rapidly becoming a commercial zone, and many neighboring townhouses were converted to commercial use.

=== Subsequent use ===
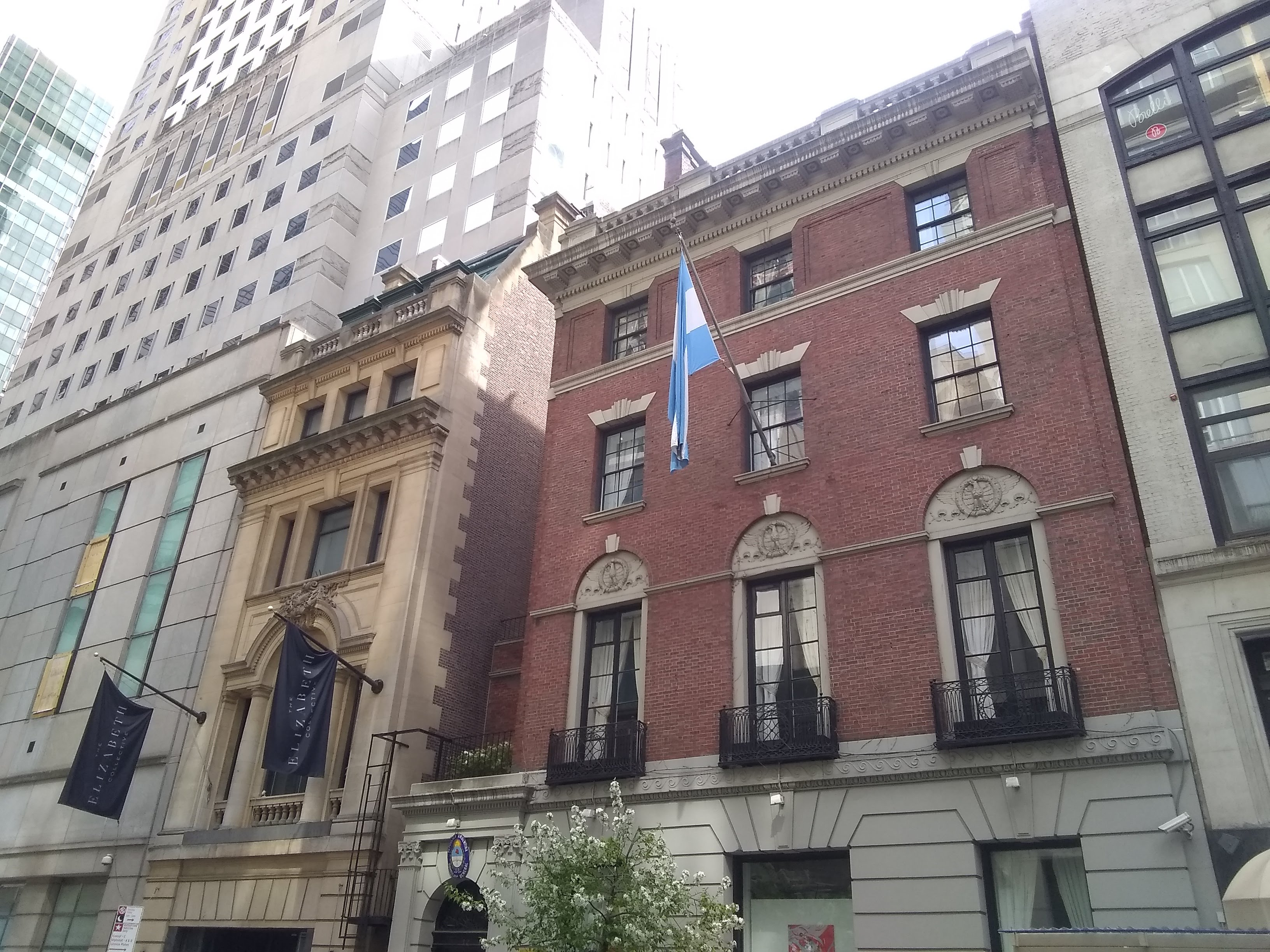
The space between 10 and 12 West 56th Street, originally a courtyard, now contains number 12's entrance.

In early 1914, the Calumet Club of Fifth Avenue and 29th Street voted to move further north. The club purchased an option for the Hollins house at the end of May. The next week, the club's leadership decided upon the Hollins residence as their new headquarters. The club officially took title to the building in July, with plans to remodel the house and open it by that September. The next month, the club's directors received permission to extend the duration of a $170,000 mortgage and take out another mortgage of $75,000 for the house. Records show that McKim, Mead & White was hired to redesign the house. The club moved into the house later the same year. At that time, it was one of several clubs clustered around Fifth Avenue in Midtown; others included the Knickerbocker Club and Colony Club. In 1924, J.E.R. Carpenter was hired to remodel the Calumet Club again and to add an entrance portico on the eastern side of the original house.

By the late 1920s, many of the old clubs around Fifth Avenue in midtown were moving elsewhere. The Calumet Club closed in May 1935 due to a lack of money. As part of a foreclosure proceeding against the club, the Hollins house was placed for auction. From that September, the house was occupied by antiques dealer Charles J. Duveen for his firm Charles of London. The next month, Chase National Bank acquired the building at auction for $184,000. The antiques store operated for two and a half years, and Duveen announced in May 1938 that he would retire and close his store. In July 1939, the International Silk Guild bought 12 West 56th Street and remodeled it for its new headquarters. At the time, the sale price was indicated at $140,000.

The building was sold in January 1943 to The Salvation Army. The Salvation Army paid $50,000 for the property. The house was to be opened 24 hours a day as a Red Shield Service Club, a lodge and retreat for members of the military. The Salvation Army retreat opened in June 1943. It had a lounge, game room, writing room, dining canteen, kitchen, library, and eighteen bedrooms with sixty beds. The Salvation Army operated the retreat until the end of World War II and, in that time, served 175,000 members of the military. The canteen had an average attendance of 1,600 in 1944. The Salvation Army sold the building in October 1946 to Nettie Rosenstein Accessories Corporation, which planned to move to the building in January 1947. Nettie Rosenstein Associates changed its plans to move to the house, selling it to the government of Argentina in May 1947. The Argentine government planned to renovate the house extensively and house the Argentine Navy's naval commission there.

The Argentine Navy offices opened in July 1947. The Argentine consulate to the United States in New York City opened in the building afterward. The consulate also held events such as auctions; when Argentine president Juan Perón was ousted in 1955, the New York consulate sold the large jewelry and valuable collections that Perón and his wife Eva had owned. In 1982, the New York City Landmarks Preservation Commission (LPC) held public hearings to consider 12 West 56th Street and several other structures for city landmark status. The LPC voted on the nomination in June 1984, and, on June 19 of that year, designated 12 West 56th Street as a city landmark. As of 2021, the house still serves as the Argentine consulate to the United States in New York City.

== See also ==
- List of New York City Designated Landmarks in Manhattan from 14th to 59th Streets
- Argentina–United States relations
