= Charles Joel Duveen =

Charles Joel Duveen, Sr.
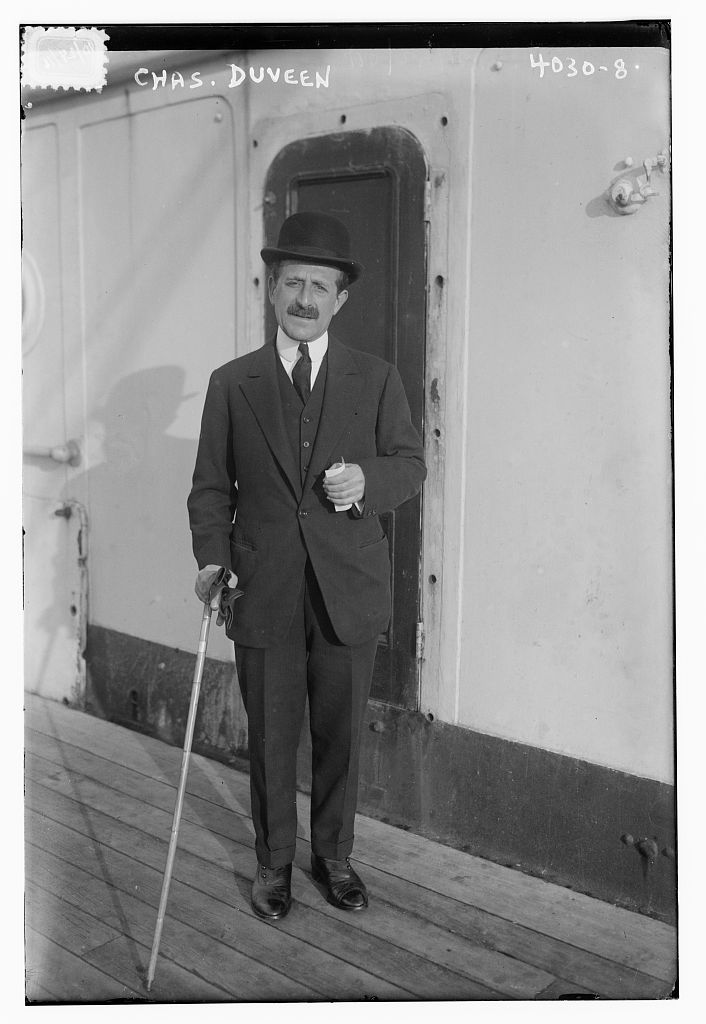
- Duveen in 1916
- Born: December 23, 1871; Hull, Yorkshire, England
- Died: July 21, 1940 (aged 68); Yonkers, New York, United States
- Spouse: Anna
- Children: Charles Joel Duveen, Jr.
- Parent: Joel Joseph Duveen
- Relatives: Joseph Duveen, 1st Baron Duveen, brother

Charles Joel Duveen, Sr. (December 23, 1871 – July 21, 1940) was an antique dealer at Charles of London.

== Biography ==
He was born in Hull, England, on December 23, 1871, to Joel Joseph Duveen. His brothers were Joseph Duveen, 1st Baron Duveen, and Henry Joseph Duveen. He married Anna and had as his son, Charles Joel Duveen, Jr.

He died on July 21, 1940, in Yonkers, New York, at St. John's Hospital. He was buried in Ferncliff Cemetery.
