= Malthusian equilibrium =

Situation when all of a population's production is used only for subsistence

A population is in Malthusian equilibrium when all of its production is used only for subsistence. Malthusian equilibrium is a locally stable and a dynamic equilibrium.

== See also ==
- Thomas Malthus — See this article for further exposition.
- An Essay on the Principle of Population
- Malthusian growth model
- Malthusian trap
- Population dynamics
