= Daniel Graham (apothecary) =

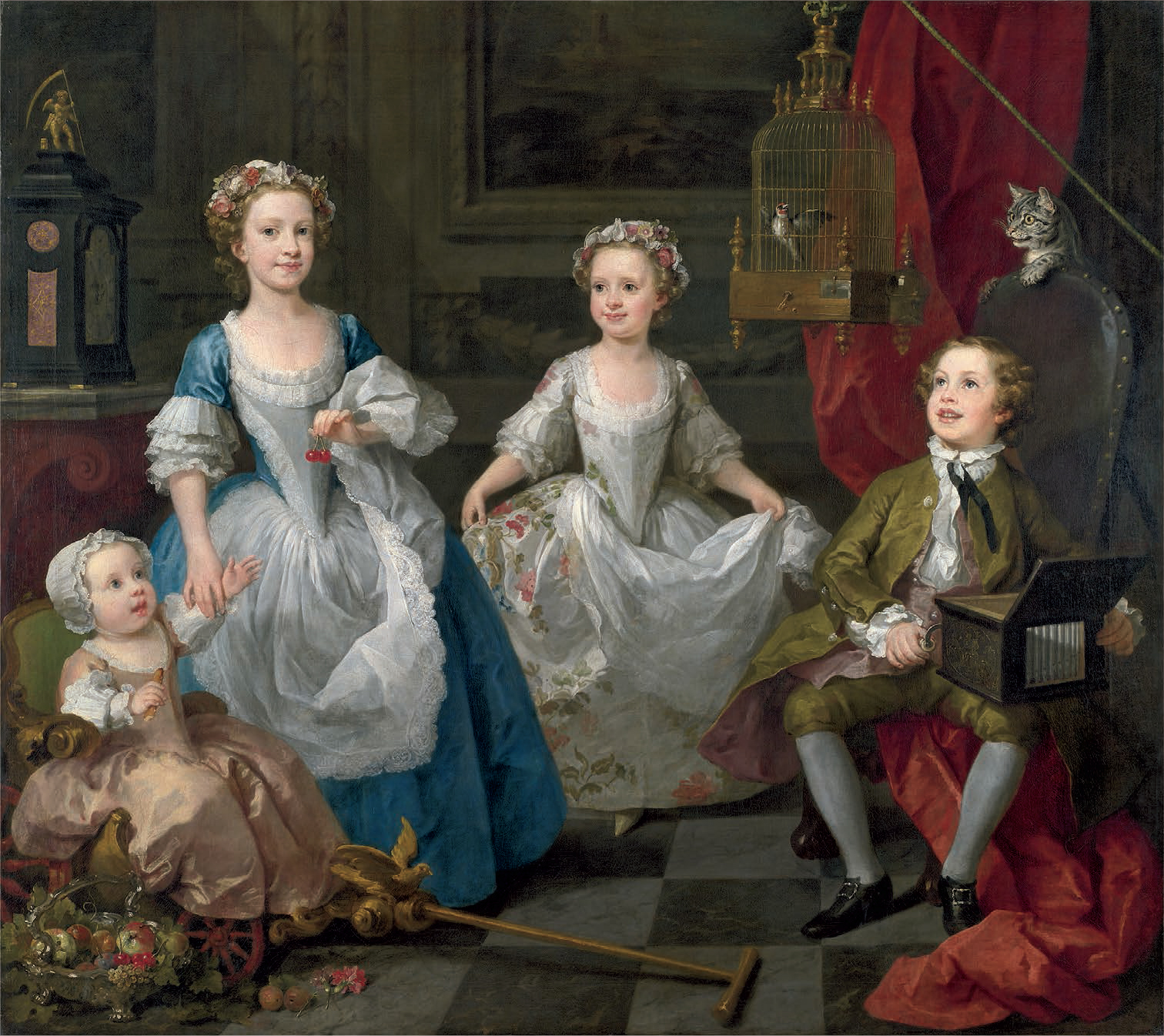
The Graham Children, 1742, William Hogarth. Oil on canvas, National Gallery, London.

Daniel Graham (c. 1695 - March 1778) was apothecary to King George II, King George III and Chelsea College Hospital. He was the son of Thomas Graham (c. 1666 - 1733) who was apothecary to King George I and George II, and was apothecary general to the British army.

== The Graham Children ==
Around 1742, Daniel Graham commissioned William Hogarth to paint a portrait of his children. Hogarth produced The Graham Children, one of his most successful conversation pieces (an informal group portrait of family or friends, often engaged in conversation or some other kind of activity). From left to right in the picture are Thomas, born 1740 and dressed in skirts as was typical for small boys until they were breeched, Henrietta (later mother of the economist Thomas Robert Malthus), Anna Maria and Richard.

The painting is noted for its many references to mortality, the passing of time and the fragility of life as Thomas had died by the time the painting was completed. It remained in the ownership of Richard Robert Graham, depicted on the far right of the painting, at least until his death in 1816. It then had several owners before it was acquired by Lord Duveen who presented it to the British National Gallery in 1934.
