= Thomas Graham (apothecary) =

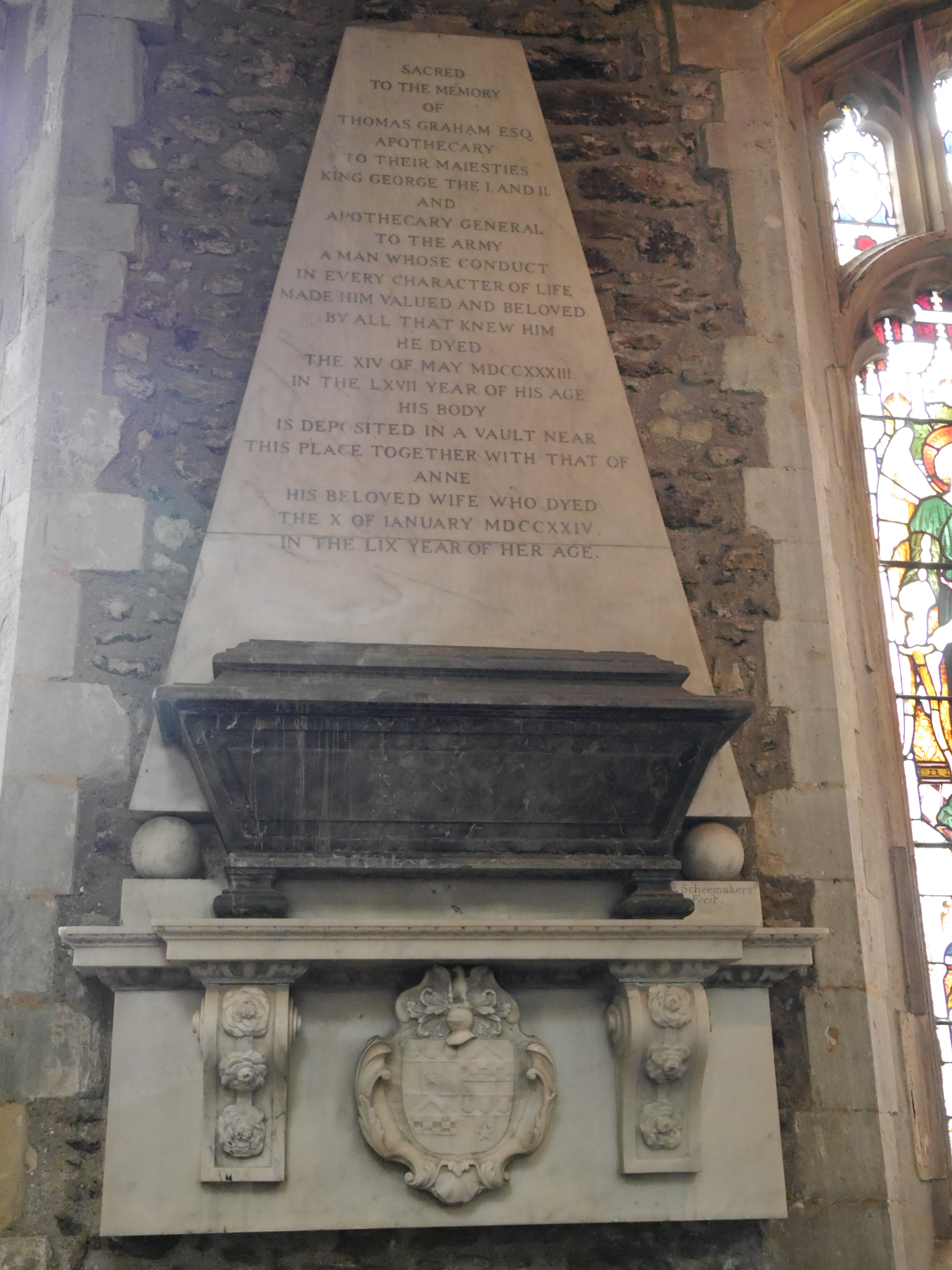
Memorial, St Mary's, Harrow on the Hill

Thomas Graham (c. 1666 – 14 May 1733) was apothecary to King George I and George II, and was apothecary general to the British army.

Graham served his apprenticeship in Scotland, from which country he hailed, and was admitted as a "foreign brother" of the Society of Apothecaries on 14 September 1698.

Thomas died at his home in Pall Mall in London and was buried at St Mary's, Harrow on the Hill, where a wall plaque commemorates him and his wife Anne.

His son was Daniel Graham (c. 1695–1788) who was apothecary to King George II, King George III and Chelsea College Hospital. A granddaughter- Daniel's daughter, Henrietta- was the mother of Robert Malthus.
