= Joseph Joel Duveen =

Dutch art dealer (1843-1908)

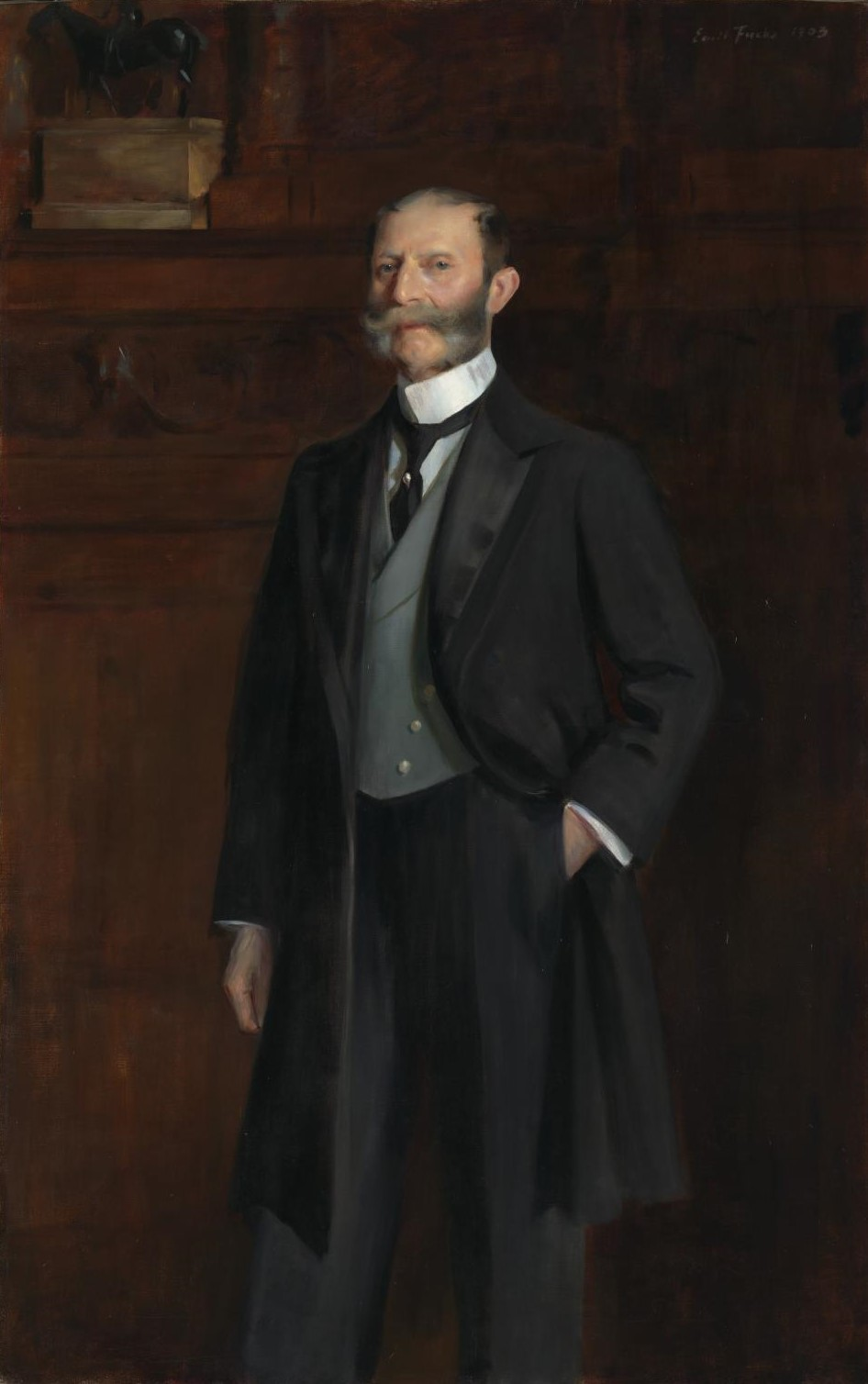
Sir Joseph Joel Duveen, 1903

Sir Joseph Joel Duveen (8 May 1843 – 9 November 1908) was an art dealer and benefactor of art galleries. Born in the Netherlands, he and his brother Henry J. Duveen founded in Britain the firm of Duveen Brothers.

== Early life ==
He was born in Meppel in the Netherlands on 8 May 1843, the son of Eva (van Minden) and Joseph Henoch Duveen, who were both from Dutch Jewish families. His grandfather, Henry Duveen, who had first settled in Meppel during the Napoleonic Wars, was the youngest son of Joseph Duveen of Giessen, army contractor to the King of Saxony; Napoleon's repudiation of the debts of the Saxon forces ruined this Duveen, whose twelve sons were then driven to seek their fortunes in different countries.

Joseph left Meppel in 1866 and settled in Hull, starting as a general dealer. He possessed a good knowledge of Nanking porcelain, then coming into fashion; cargo loads of this had been brought to Holland by the early Dutch traders with China. He purchased large quantities, which he shipped it to Hull, and found a ready market in London.

== Expansion of business ==
In partnership with his younger brother Henry he secured the chief American trade in Oriental porcelain, and in 1877 opened a branch house at Fifth Avenue, New York. They formed many notable collections in America, and they largely helped in the formation of the Taft, Widener, Gould, Altmann and Morgan art collections.

In 1879, the brothers erected fine art galleries adjoining the Pantheon in Oxford Street, London, and took an important share in the fine art trade, extending their interests in several branches, particularly in that of old tapestry, of which they became the largest purchasers. The Duveens built spacious art galleries in Old Bond Street in the spring of 1894.

From 1890 onward, they purchased pictures and were large buyers at the Mulgrave Castle sale of 1890 and at the Murrieta sale two years later. They purchased the whole of the Hainauer collection of Renaissance objets d'art for about £250,000 in June 1906, and in 1907 the Rodolphe Kann collection of pictures and objets d'art in Paris for nearly £0.75 million.

== Benefaction ==
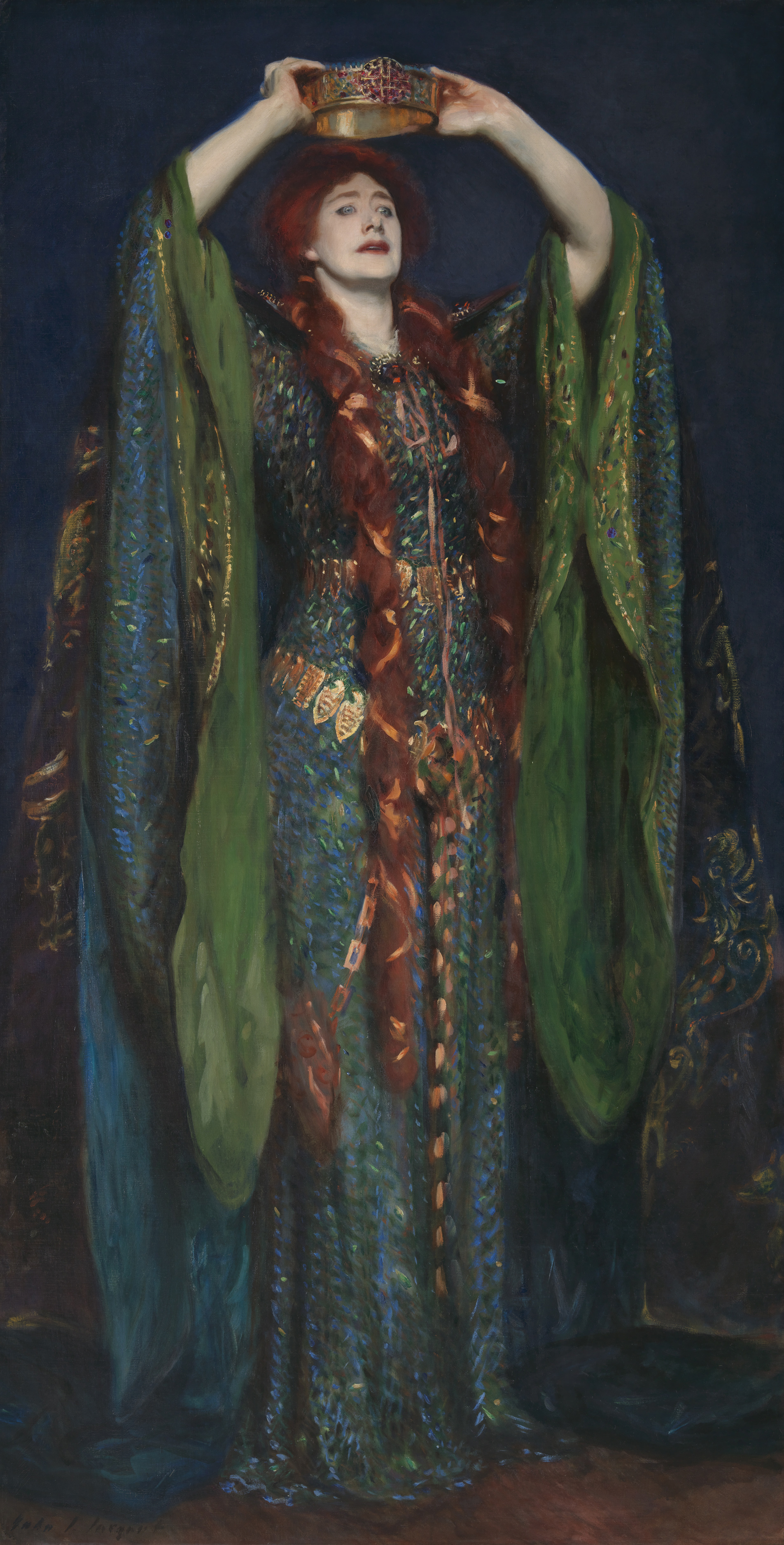
John Singer Sargent's portrait of Ellen Terry

Duveen became wealthy, and was generous in benefaction of art galleries. He was a subscriber to the public purchase of Diego Velázquez's Rokeby Venus for the National Gallery in 1906, and in the same year he presented John Singer Sargent's Ellen Terry as Lady Macbeth, which he bought at the Irving sale at Christie's in 1905 for £1200, to the Tate Gallery.

In May 1908, he undertook the cost (about £35,000) of an extension to the Tate Gallery. It was designed by W. H. Romaine-Walker: five rooms were added to the main floor and two to the lower. It allowed the gallery's paintings by J. M. W. Turner to be displayed, and was called the Turner Wing. It was completed in 1910.

== Honours ==
He was knighted on 26 June 1908.

== Death ==
Duveen died in Hyères, France, on 9 November 1908, and was buried at Willesden Jewish Cemetery. His wife Rosetta, daughter of Abraham Barnett of Hull, whom he married in 1869, survived him; they had a family of ten sons and four daughters. His son Joseph Duveen (1869–1939) was an influential art dealer.
