= Henry J. Duveen =

Dutch art dealer and philatelist (1854-1919)

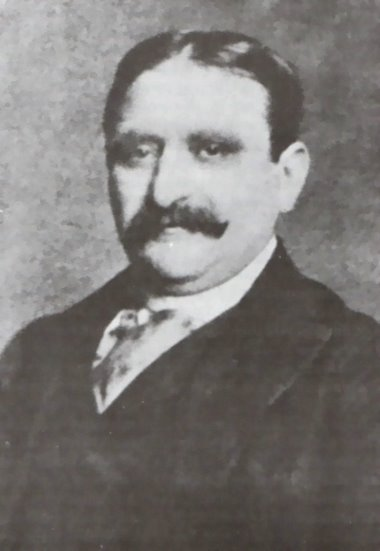
- Born: 26 October 1854; Meppel, Netherlands
- Died: 15 January 1919 (aged 64)
- Occupation: Art dealer
- Relatives: Joseph Joel Duveen (brother); Joseph Duveen (nephew)

Henry Joseph Duveen (26 October 1854 – 15 January 1919) was a British art dealer who co-founded the firm of Duveen Brothers with his brother, Joseph.

Duveen was born in Meppel, Netherlands, the son of Eva (van Minden) and Joseph Henoch Duveen, who were both from Dutch Jewish families.

After his brother's death from Bright's disease in 1908, his nephew, the future Lord Duveen, worked alongside his uncle. He was also an eminent philatelist who was one of the Fathers of Philately named on the Roll of Distinguished Philatelists in 1921.

== Art dealing ==
Henry Duveen went to New York to establish a gallery there in the 1870s whilst his brother, Joel Joseph, founded galleries in London and Paris. One of Henry's first clients was the department store owner Benjamin Altman who until his death in 1913 purchased a large collection of Oriental porcelain from him, as well as many Rembrandts, Italian Renaissance masterpieces, and old rugs etc.

== Philately ==
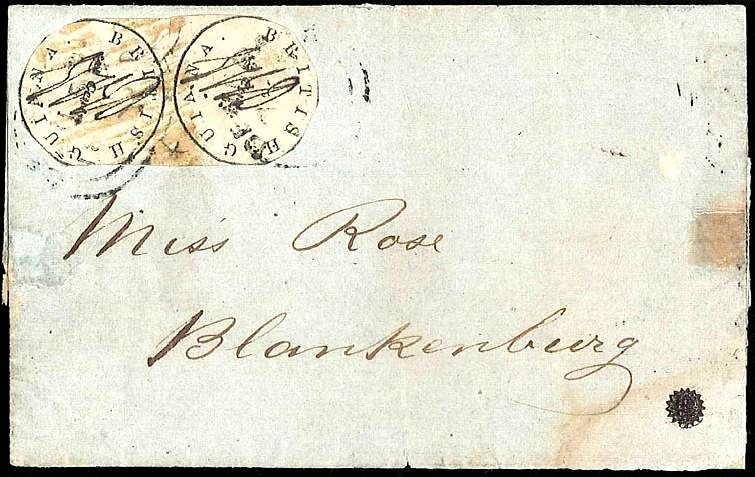
The "Miss Rose" cover of British Guiana, c. 1850. Discovered 1896.

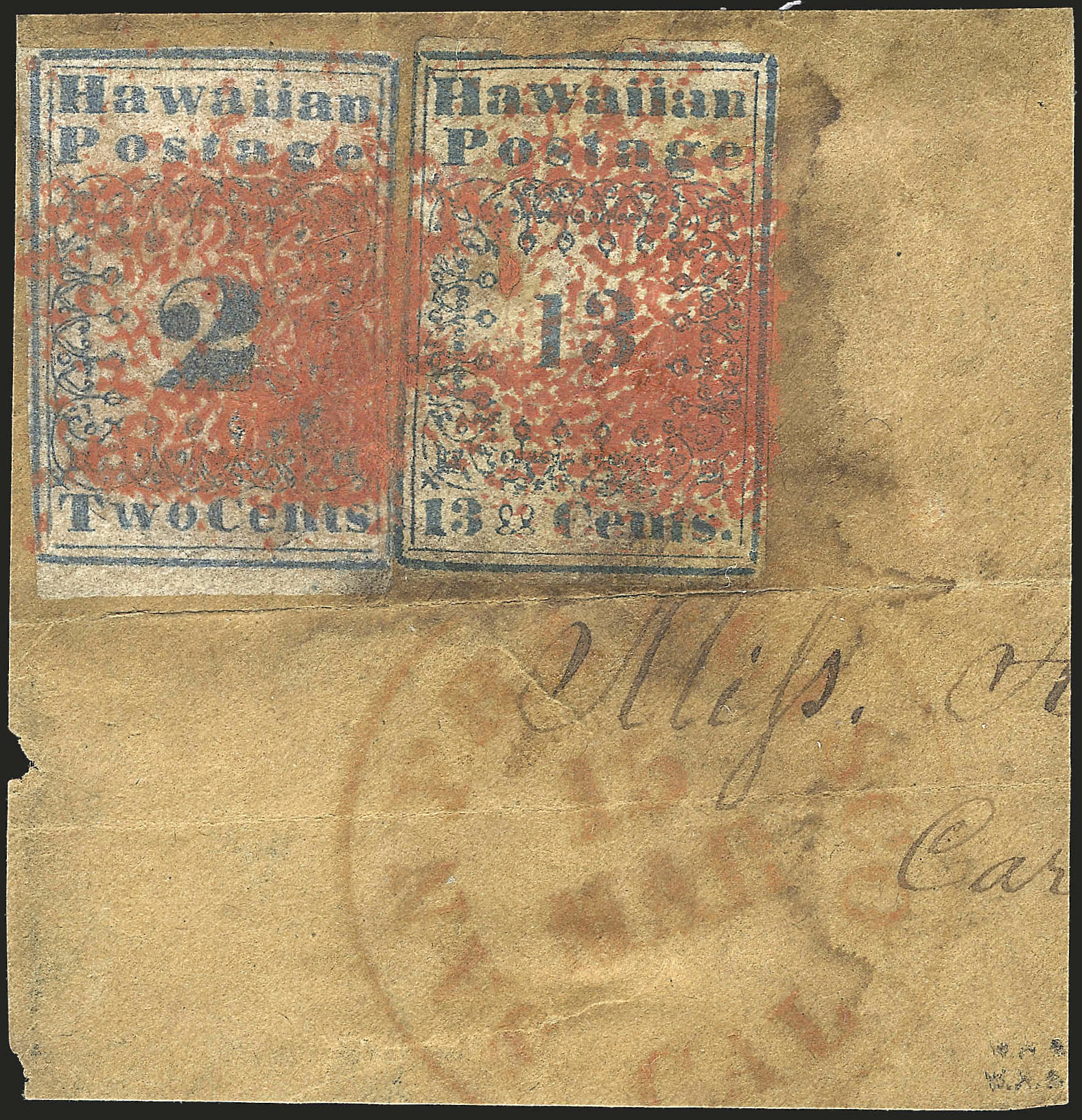
The Hawaiian Missionary 2c and 13c stamps on piece once owned by Duveen.

Duveen owned some of the great rarities of philately, including the "Miss Rose" cover franked with a pair of British Guiana "cotton reels" and more than one Post Office Mauritius. He restricted himself to issues before 1896 and, at its height, his collection took up sixty-nine Stanley Gibbons Oriel albums. Duveen's son, Sir Geoffrey Edgar Duveen (1883–1975), inherited his general stamp collection.
