= Joseph Duveen, 1st Baron Duveen =

British art dealer (1869–1939)

The Right Honourable The Lord Duveen
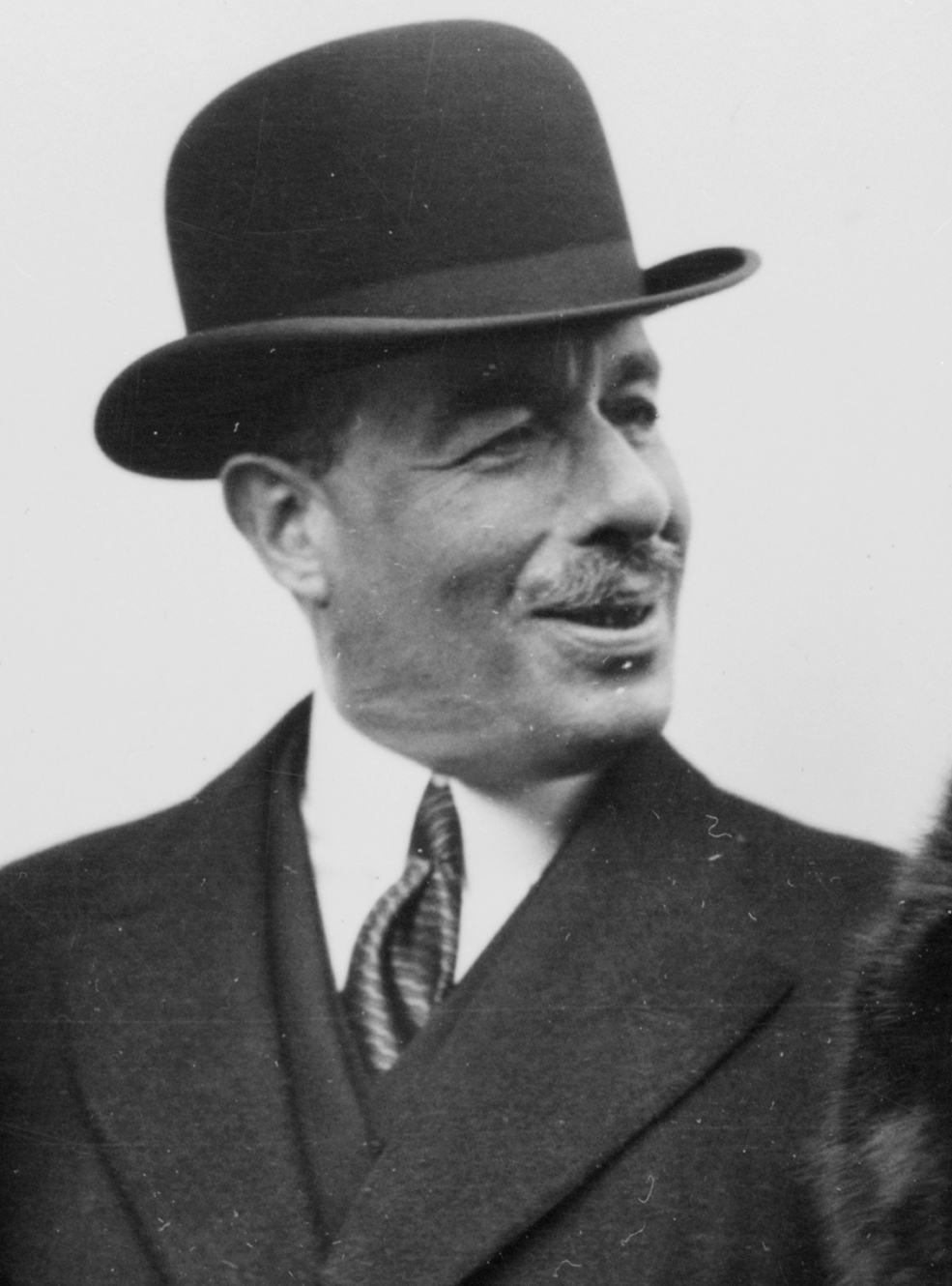
- Duveen in the 1920s
- Born: 14 October 1869; Hull, England
- Died: 25 May 1939 (aged 69); London, England
- Spouse: Elsie Duveen (m. 1899)
- Children: 1 daughter
- Father: Joseph Joel Duveen
- Relatives: Henry J. Duveen (uncle)

Joseph Duveen, 1st Baron Duveen (14 October 1869 – 25 May 1939), known as Sir Joseph Duveen, Baronet, between 1927 and 1933, was a British art dealer who was considered one of the most influential art dealers of all time.

== Life and career ==
Joseph Duveen was British by birth, the eldest of thirteen children of Rosetta (Barnett) and Sir Joseph Joel Duveen, a Dutch-Jewish immigrant who had set up a prosperous import business in Hull.

The Duveen brothers' firm became very successful and became involved in trading antiques. Duveen Senior died in 1908; Joseph took over the business, working in partnership with his late father's brother Henry J. Duveen. He had received a thorough and stimulating education at University College School. He moved the Duveen company into the risky, but lucrative, trade in paintings and quickly became one of the world's leading art dealers due to his good eye, sharpened by his reliance on Bernard Berenson, and skilled salesmanship.

His success is famously attributed to his observation that "Europe has a great deal of art, and America has a great deal of money." He made his fortune by buying works of art from declining European aristocrats and selling them to the millionaires of the United States.

Clients included Henry Clay Frick, William Randolph Hearst, Henry E. Huntington, Samuel H. Kress, Andrew Mellon, J. P. Morgan, John D. Rockefeller Sr., Edward T. Stotesbury, and a Canadian, Frank Porter Wood. The works that Duveen shipped across the Atlantic remain the core collections of many of the United States' most famous museums. Duveen played an important role in selling to self-made industrialists on the notion that buying art was also buying upper-class status. He greatly expanded the market, especially for Renaissance paintings with the help of Bernard Berenson, who certified some questionable attributions, but whose ability to put an artistic personality behind paintings helped market them to purchasers whose dim perception of art history was as a series of biographies of "masters".

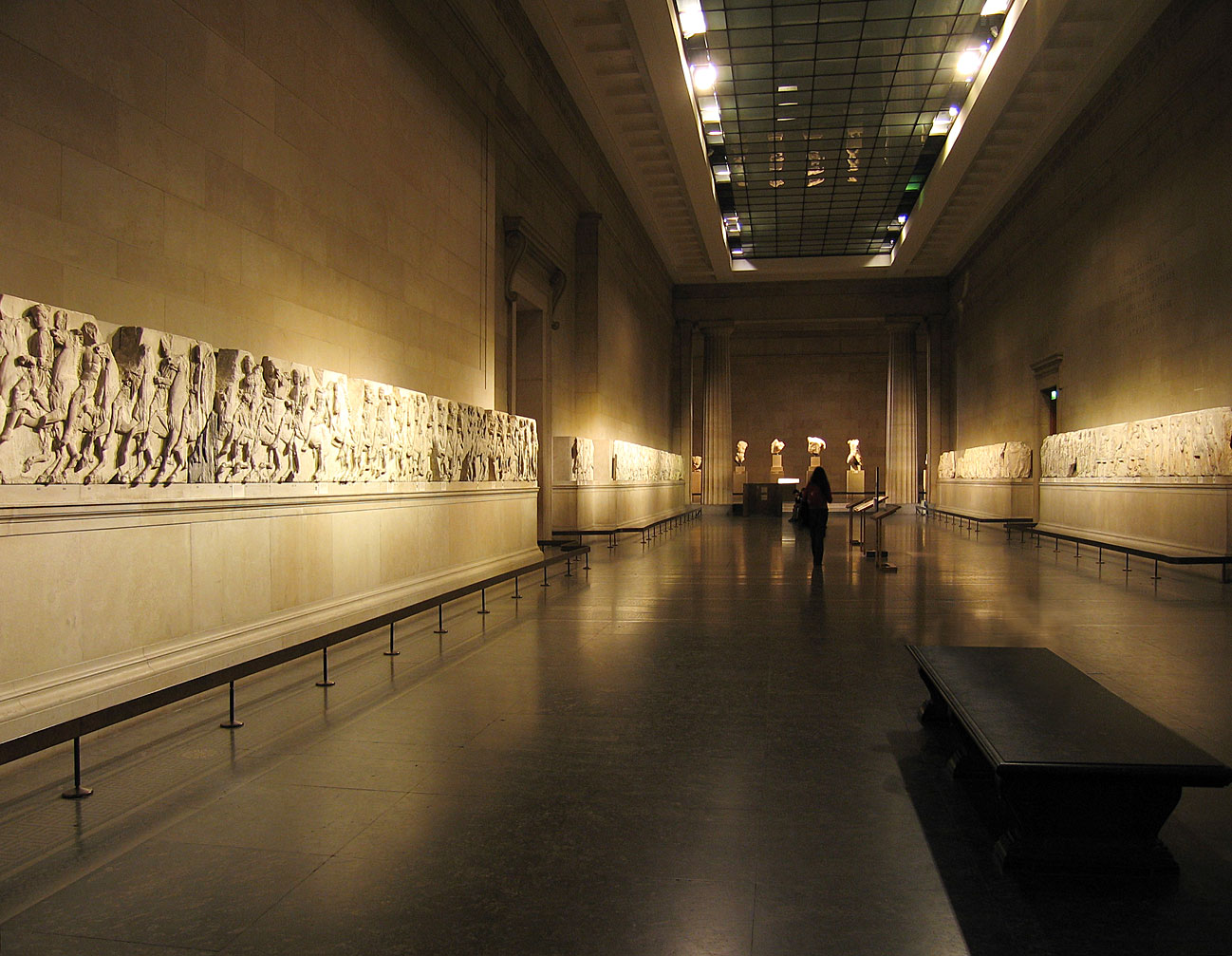
The Elgin Marbles in the Duveen Gallery of the British Museum

Duveen quickly became enormously wealthy and made many philanthropic donations. He donated paintings to British galleries and gave considerable sums to repair and expand several galleries and museums. He built the Duveen Gallery of the British Museum to house the Elgin Marbles and funded a major extension of the Tate Gallery. He was also controversial, said to have damaged old masters by 'overcleaning' and his name is associated with the Parthenon marbles 'scouring' scandal.

== Honours ==
For his philanthropy, he was knighted in 1919, made a Baronet of Millbank in the City of Westminster in 1927 and raised to the peerage as Baron Duveen of Millbank in the City of Westminster on 3 February 1933.

== Personal life ==
Duveen married Elsie (1881–1963), daughter of Gustav Salomon of New York, on 31 July 1899. They had a daughter, Dorothy Rose (1903–1985). She married, firstly, Sir William Francis Cuthbert Garthwaite, 2nd Bt. (1906–1993), on 23 July 1931 (div. 1937), and secondly, in 1938, Bryan Hartop Burns, Orthopædic Surgeon to St George's Hospital, of Upper Wimpole Street, London.

== Controversy ==
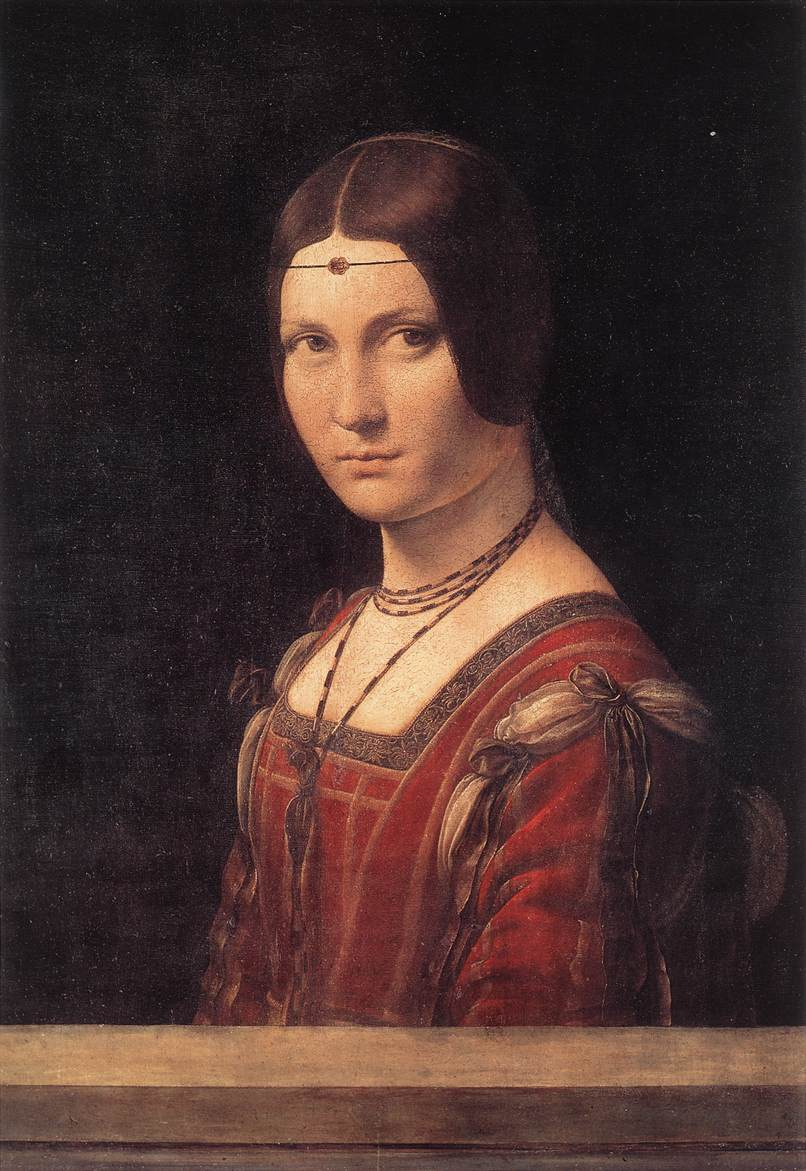
La belle ferronnière, by Leonardo da Vinci, in the Louvre, Paris; the authenticity of another version of this painting was questioned by Duveen.

In 1921, Duveen was sued by Andrée Hahn for $500,000 after making comments questioning the authenticity of a version of the Leonardo painting La belle ferronnière that she owned and had planned to sell. The case took seven years to come to trial and after the first jury returned an open verdict, Duveen agreed to settle, paying Hahn $60,000 plus court costs.

In recent years, Duveen's reputation has suffered considerably. Restorers working under his guidance damaged Old Master panel paintings by scraping off old varnish and giving the paintings a glossy finish. He was also personally responsible for the damaging restoration work done to the Elgin Marbles. Unhappy with the remnants of ancient pigment on the Marbles, he asked his agents to scrub them with sharp tools in order to make them white. A number of the paintings he sold have turned out to be fakes; it is uncertain whether he knew this when they were sold.

== Legacy ==
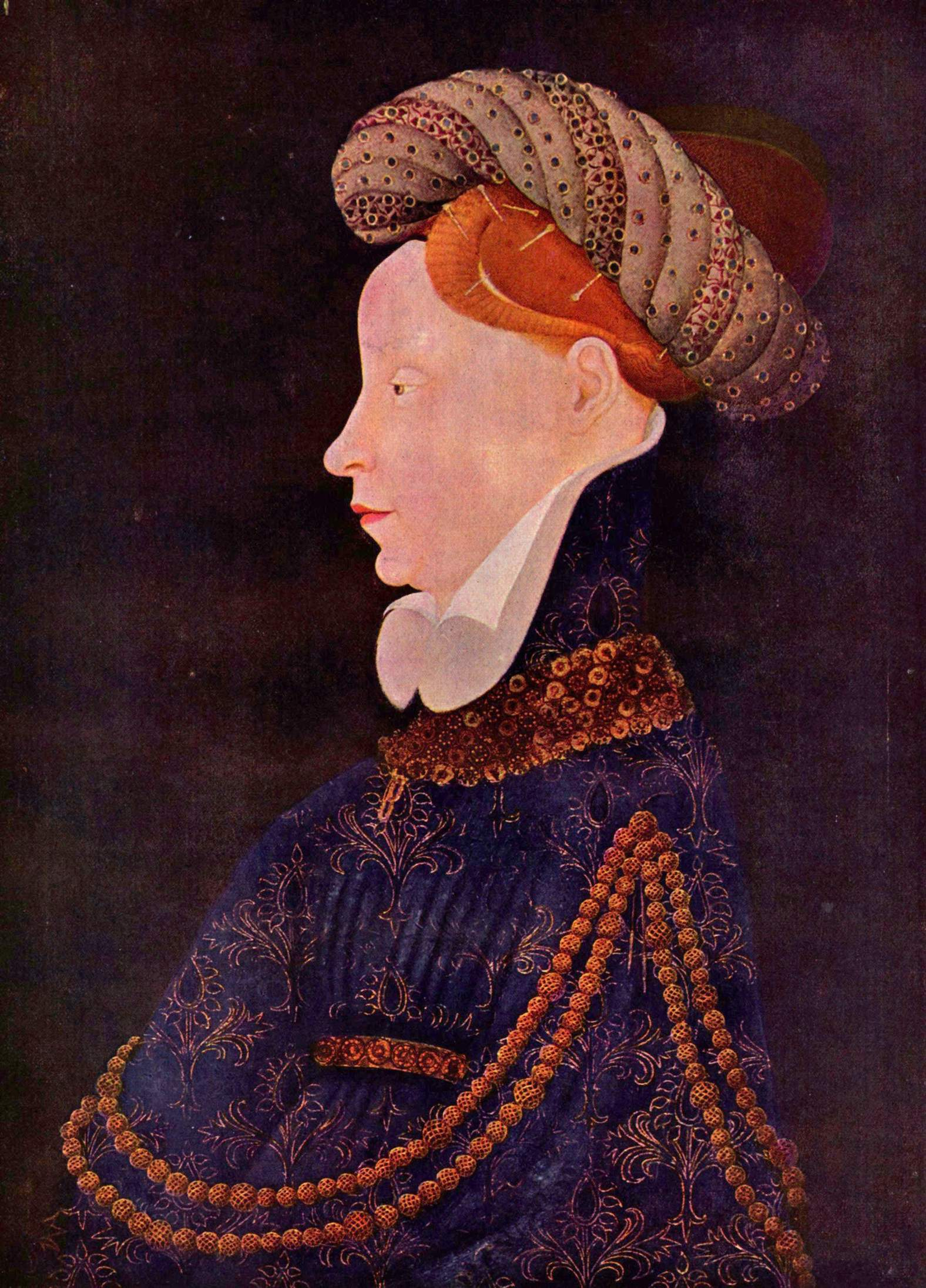
The oldest Western panel portrait of a woman, now in the National Gallery of Art, Washington. Photographs prove Duveen significantly altered the hair and headdress to make it look like a Pisanello of the 1440s. It is now catalogued as by an unknown "Franco-Flemish Master" of about 1410.

Duveen greatly increased the trade in bringing great works of art from Europe to America. He eventually became "the art dealer", through shrewd planning and his insight into human behaviour. If a great painting came onto the market, he always outbid the opposition and eventually acquired the finest collections. He went to great lengths to purchase great works of art and his network went well beyond American millionaires, English royalty, and art critics. He also relied heavily on valets, maids and butlers of his own household and those of his clients. Because he was capable of making potentially generous payments to top-flight servants, he was often rewarded with information to which other art dealers never had access.

One incident from S. N. Behrman's biography, Duveen, illustrates this. When Duveen was still a young man in his father's employment, a well-to-do couple came into the store to buy tapestries. As the lady was choosing and picking up pieces generously, Duveen's father discreetly asked him to find out who these people were. Duveen went outside to the horseman and was told that the couple were Mr and Mrs. Guinness. Duveen wrote their names and slipped it on a piece of paper to his father, when the lady was almost finished she innocently asked "We are buying so many tapestries, you must be wondering why?" Duveen's father immediately beamed and said "Of course not, Lady Guinness, you have so many beautiful homes, you will need more than one tapestry to decorate them!" The Guinnesses were subsequently ennobled in the 1890s; Duveen had successfully flattered Mrs Guinness by addressing her as "Lady Guinness".

Duveen played a large part in forming many of the collections that are now in North American museums, for example the Frick Collection in New York, the Frank P. Wood collection at the Art Gallery of Ontario, the Huntington Library, and the Mellon and Kress collections now in the National Gallery of Art in Washington and elsewhere. Duveen exploited his American clients' wish for immortality through buying great works of art, an ambition in which they were successful: today only economic historians can name the rich partners of Frick, Mellon or Morgan. One of his later clients was J. Paul Getty, who, though he was less interested in paintings, bought from Duveen the second Ardabil Carpet. Duveen had always kept a number of grand French furniture and tapestries in stock.

Duveen's portrait was painted by many artists, but his best painter-friend was the Swiss-born American artist Adolfo Müller-Ury (1862–1947), who painted him three times, in 1923, 1929 and 1938. The 1923 portrait was reproduced on the cover of Meryle Secrest's 2004 biography, and later sold at TEFAF Maastricht in 2006 for $95,000. Müller-Ury also painted a full-length standing portrait of his daughter Dorothy as a girl in 1914, and in 1924, at the time of her engagement, a bust-length portrait, which was exhibited the following year at Müller-Ury's exhibition at Duveen Brothers as 'Miss X'. Dorothy Elaine Vicaji also painted Dorothy.

Lord Duveen died in May 1939 aged 69 and is buried in Willesden Jewish Cemetery in London. The baronetcy and barony became extinct upon his death.

In February 2026, as part of the magazine's one-hundreth-year celebration, The New Yorker featured the online presentation of one of its "classic" articles--the first and last installments of S.N. Behrman's original six-part profile of Duveen that had been published from Sept.-Oct., 1951.

== Arms ==
Coat of arms of Joseph Duveen, 1st Baron Duveen
Crest In front of a Garb Or banded Azure two Trefoils in saltire slipped Vert Escutcheon Argent on a Bend Azure three Bees volant Or a Chief Gules Supporters On either side a Lion guardant Gules charged on the shoulder with a Plate thereon a Chinese Dragon Azure Motto Honor Industriae Praemium

== In popular culture ==
According to The New Yorker, the character played by Adrien Brody in Wes Anderson's The French Dispatch is inspired by Duveen.

A popular Broadway play called Lord Pengo by S. N. Behrman and starring Charles Boyer was staged in 1962; the title character was clearly based on Duveen.

In novel "Sherlock Holmes and the Real Thing" (2025) by Nicholas Meyer main villain, art dealer, according to preface is based on Duveen.

== References and sources ==
Sources

- S.N. Behrman: Duveen. (New edition: Hamish Hamilton, London, 1972. ISBN 0-241-02179-0).
- Rachel Cohen: "Priceless – How Art Became Commerce". The New Yorker, 8 October 2012. pp. 64–71.
- Meryle Secrest: Duveen: A Life in Art. 2004.
- Simon Gray's play The Old Masters. 2004.

Peerage of the United Kingdom
New creation	Baron Duveen; 1933–1939	Extinct
Baronetage of the United Kingdom
New creation	Baronet (of Millbank); 1927–1939	Extinct
