= Hans Snook =

British businessman (born 1948)

Hans Roger Snook (born 1948) is a British businessman, best known for his time as the founder (with Graham Howe) and chief executive of British mobile phone company Orange.

== Early life ==
Snook was born in 1948 to a German mother and a British father in Dissen, Lower Saxony, Germany. The family emigrated to Vancouver, British Columbia, Canada in 1957, where Snook later attended the University of British Columbia.

== Career ==
He then began a career in hotel management, which led him to Calgary for six years. In 1983, he set off on a round-the-world trip, which was cut short when he arrived in Hong Kong and became chief executive of a wireless paging business (which subsequently became part of the Hutchison Whampoa Group). In 1992 Snook was despatched to the UK where he closed Hutchison's Rabbit CT2 phone network and directed efforts to developing the UK's fourth mobile phone network.

On 28 April 1994, Orange was launched. Within five years the company had developed an enviable reputation as well as a growing international presence.

In October 1999, Mannesmann of Germany purchased Orange plc, in a failed attempt to challenge Vodafone as the world's leading mobile phone company. This set off a chain of events which resulted in France Télécom taking ownership of Orange, and in 2001 Snook stepped down as a special advisor to Orange. His public involvement since then in the UK telecoms industry was as chairman of Carphone Warehouse between 2002 and 2005. On stepping down from this post he was appointed non-executive chairman of Monstermob Group plc, the ringtone company.

From 2002, Snook was a director of The Diagnostic Clinic Ltd, providing health screening linked to alternative medicine, and its parent company The Integrated Health Consultancy Limited. Both companies entered liquidation in 2012 with aggregate debts of £8.6 million, of which £7.2m was owed to Snook.

== Personal life ==
Hans is divorced from his first wife Etta Lai Yee Lau. He is now married to Helen Seward. They live in Marbella.

== See also ==
- Peter Erskine (businessman), founder of O2
- Chris Gent, founder of Vodafone

Business positions
Preceded by	Chief Executive of Orange (UK); April 1994 – December 2000	Succeeded by John Allwood
