= Graham Howe (businessman) =

British entrepreneur and businessman

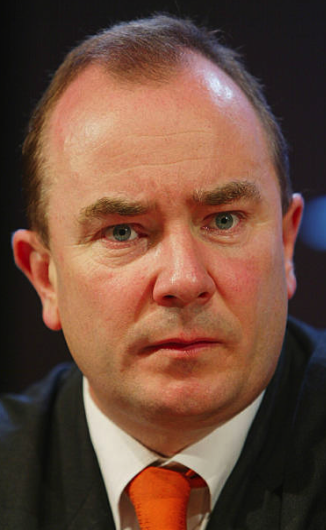

Graham Edward Howe (born 23 May 1961) is a British entrepreneur and businessman who founded Orange with Hans Snook.

== Early life ==
He was born in St Albans.

He went to St Albans Grammar School for Boys (now known since 1975 as the comprehensive Verulam School), and later attended the University of Birmingham where he obtained a Bachelor of Commerce.

== Career ==
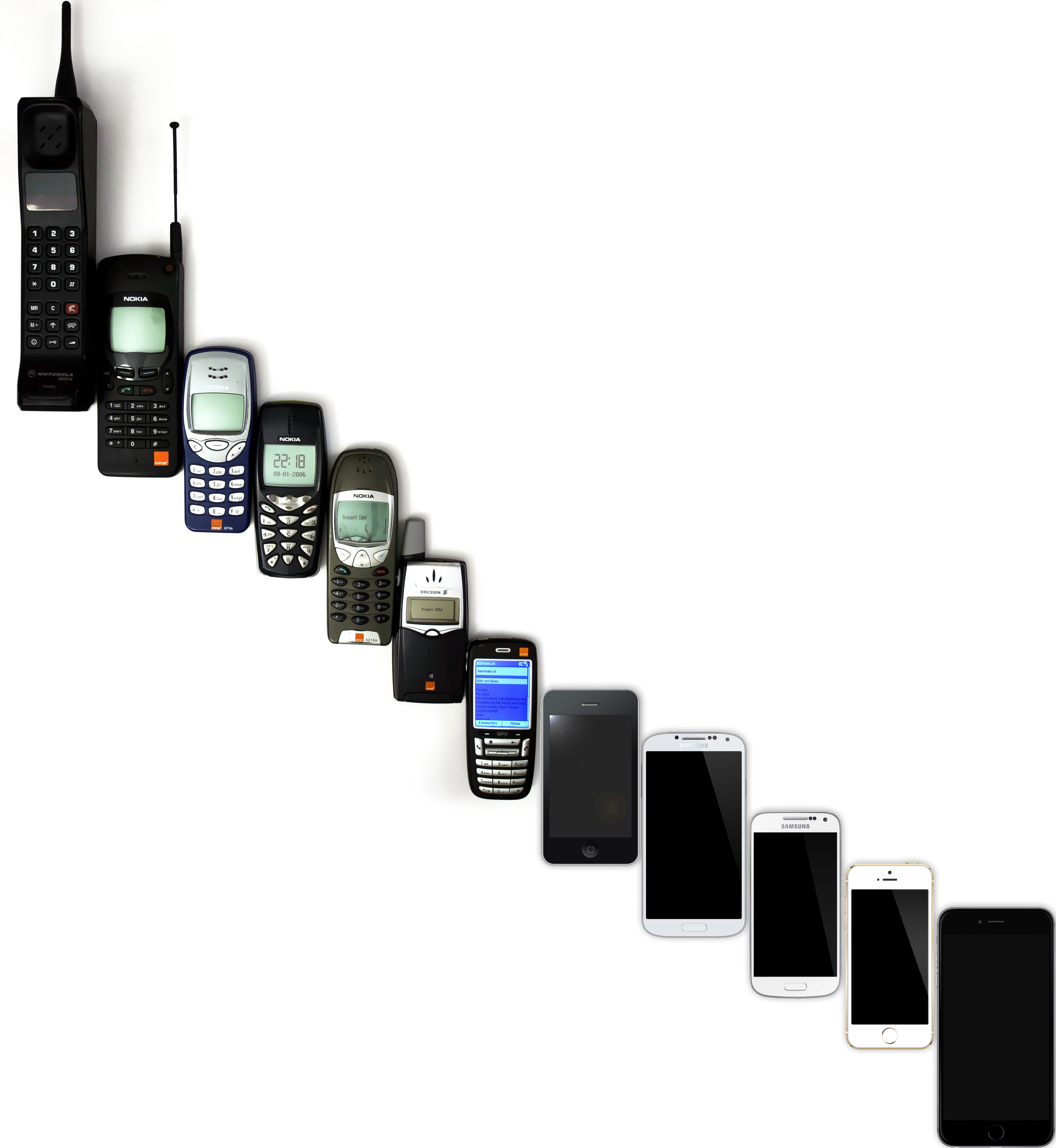
Mobile phone evolution (on Orange networks)

Graham began his career at Touche Ross (now Deloitte LLP) working in the Manchester audit department. He became ACA qualified before moving down to London to work for Touche Ross Consulting.

In the late 80s he moved to Hong Kong where he met Hans Snook whilst working at Hutchison Whampoa.

Hans Snook had the ideas for Orange. However it was Graham Howe who would get the company off the ground. They met in 1992. Orange launched in April 1994. It floated on the London Stock Exchange and on the Nasdaq in April 1996.

Howe and Snook's partnership helped take the company to unprecedented heights. Their partnership, as detailed in Sven-Goran Ericsson's book 'Leadership the Sven-Goran Eriksson way', was highly successful and was compared to that of Bill Gates and Paul Allen, Brian Clough and Peter taylor.

In October 1999, Orange UK was bought for £21bn by Düsseldorf-based Mannesmann AG, then run by Klaus Esser. Howe and Snook reportedly earn't £29m and £45m respectively from the crystallisation of share options post acquisition.

In early 2000, Vodafone bought Mannesmann in a hostile takeover, and Vodafone was forced to sell Orange UK, which was bought by France Telecom (now known since August 2000 as Orange S.A.) for £26bn.

On 7 May 2002, Howe became Chief Operating Officer of Orange S.A. having been Chief Financial Officer of the Group (former France Telecom). He left as deputy Chief Executive of Orange S.A. on 24 March 2003 when Jean-François Pontal also retired as Chief Executive.

In June 2003 he took up the role of Senior Non Executive Director of Cable & Wireless. A position he held for 3 years before moving to become Chairman of the global education technology company Promethean.

Graham was Chairman of Promethean for 10 years before retiring in October 2015.

== Personal life ==
He is married to Jane, and has three sons (born May 1993, February 1996, and September 1998). He lives in Harpenden, home of the former Sir Edward Salisbury FRS, the famous botanist. He married Caroline Jane Doyle on 28 December 1991 in Bradford.

Business positions
| Preceded by | Deputy Chief Executive of Orange S.A. – March 2003 | Succeeded by Post abolished |
| Preceded by | Chief Operating Officer of Orange S.A. May 2002 – March 2003 | |
| Preceded by | Chief Financial Officer of Orange S.A. – May 2002 | Succeeded by Simon Duffy |
