= Archbishop Tenison's Church of England schools =

Archbishop Tenison's School is the name of two extant, historic British schools located in South London, England, named after their founder, Archbishop of Canterbury, Thomas Tenison:

- Archbishop Tenison's School in Croydon, founded in 1714.
- Archbishop Tenison's School in Lambeth, founded in 1685.

A girls' school was formally established in 1706 for 12 girls and in 1863 a new school building was erected at 18 Lambeth High Street. The girls school closed in 1961, when it amalgamated with Archbishop Temple's Boys School (202 Lambeth Road) to form a mixed VA school. The building was used by Temple's as a first-year annex from 1968 to 1974, when Archbishop Temple's School closed. The charity figures were transferred to Archbishop Michael Ramsey School, now St Michael and All Angel's Academy.

He also founded 2 other schools.
