= CT2 (disambiguation) =

CT2 is a cordless telephony standard, also known by the marketing name "Telepoint".

CT2, CT-2, CT 2 and similar may also refer to:

- ČT2 – a television channel in the Czech Republic
- Route CT2 (MBTA) – a former bus route in Massachusetts
- Casino Tycoon 2 – the second film in the Casino Tycoon series
- Connecticut's 2nd congressional district
- Connecticut Route 2 – a state route in Connecticut, US
- Crazy Taxi 2 – the second game in the Crazy Taxi series
