= Institut des sciences de l'ingénieur de Toulon et du Var =

Coordinates: 43°08′07″N 6°00′36″E

Institute of Engineering Sciences of Toulon and the Var
- Institut des Sciences de l'Ingénieur de Toulon et du Var
- Type: Public
- Active: 1991–2014
- Director: Olivier Le Calvé since 2009 François Resch from 1991 to 2009
- Location: La Valette-du-Var near Toulon and Hyères, France
- Website: http://isitv.univ-tln.fr/

The Institut des Sciences de l'Ingénieur de Toulon et du Var (English: Institute of Engineering Sciences of Toulon and the Var), or ISITV, was a French public engineering school. It was located in the south of France, between Toulon and Hyères, on the French Riviera. In 2014, the school merged with Supméca to form a new engineering school called SeaTech.

The School was established in 1991 by combining the teaching and research resources of the University of the South, Toulon-Var with support and collaboration from industry.

== Engineering majors ==
Current engineering majors at ISITV.

=== Marine engineering ===
The marine engineering option at ISITV is a training that aims to train engineers who possess a solid scientific knowledge of the marine environment and the relevant technologies. This option provides students with the high level skills required in marine technology, offshore petroleum industry, coastal engineering, underwater robotics, remote sensing (ocean acoustics and optics)... starting from the basic sciences required to understand and describe the marine environment, hydrodynamics and fluid mechanics, oceanography, soil physics, strength of materials, corrosion....

There is a possibility of double diploma with Cranfield University (Master of Science offshore and ocean technology]) in England, and with the Escola Politécnica of the University of São Paulo in Brazil. Moreover, there is also a possibility to spend a term at the Polytechnic University of Turin in Italy.

The school possesses several important experimental structures, including a surge tank and a wave tank for studies in ocean engineering. For numerical modelling, students have access to a variety of scientific software in different areas (fluid mechanics, hydrodynamics, structures). Practicals at sea enable the students to become familiar with modern methods of measurement.

This training leads to numerous job opportunities at the national and international levels in such varied domains as offshore engineering, the protection of the seashore and offshore structures, undersea robotics, and oceanography.

=== Materials engineering ===
The engineer trained in this option biased towards the development of products, is capable of rapidly assuming responsibility in the design and realisation of complex systems.

There is a possibility of double diploma with Cranfield University (Master of Science advanced materials, Master of Science microsystems and nanotechnology) in England.

=== Telecommunications Engineering ===
The objective is to train engineers who are specialists in the modern methods of telecommunications with regard to the acquisition, transmission, and processing of information, data and signals (sound, images, shapes, etc.)

There is a possibility of double diploma with Cranfield University in England.

=== Mathematics engineering ===
The objective of this major is to train engineers who can fit into any of the engineering disciplines; engineers who are specialists in mathematical and numerical analysis, the type of engineers industry needs to create and use mathematical models and algorithms to solve complex problems.

This major is no more available; the option was closed in 2007.

== Research ==
Students can continue at the post-graduate and doctoral level in the various laboratories of the university. Four laboratories are geographically located at ISITV :

- Complex Naval Systems Laboratory
- MAPIEM - Applied Chemistry Laboratory
- LSEET - Laboratory for the Study Particulate Exchanges at Interfaces
- IMATH - Institute of Mathematics of Toulon

The integration of these research teams in the school places them at the interface between university research and the world of work.

== See also ==
- University of the South, Toulon-Var
