= CT-1 =

CT-1, CT1 and CT 1 can refer to:

- ČT1, a television channel in the Czech Republic
- CT1, a cordless telephone standard
- Cosina CT-1, a 35mm film SLR camera
- Connecticut's 1st congressional district
- U.S. Route 1 in Connecticut
- Cardiotrophin 1
- Route CT1 (MBTA), a former bus route in Massachusetts
