= Arcor (disambiguation) =

Arcor is an Argentine confectionery company.

Arcor may also refer to:

- Arcor (telecommunications), a German telecommunications company
- Arcore (Lombard: Arcor), a municipality in Lombardy, Italy

== See also ==
- ARCore, a software development kit
