= SeaTech =

- SeaTech
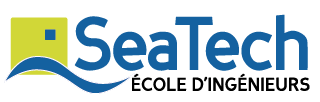
- Cap sur l'innovation
- Type: Grande École
- Established: 2014
- Parent institution: ISITV / Supmeca Toulon
- Affiliations: CDEFI
- Director: Éric Moreau
- Students: 500
- Location: La Garde, Var, France; 43.136657°N 6.012553°E
- Campus: University of Toulon - Campus of La Garde
- Language: French
- Website: www.seatech.fr

SeaTech is a French public engineering school (Grande École). It was created in 2014 from two other engineering schools : ISITV and Supmeca Toulon.

It offers a Diplôme d'Ingénieur recognized by the Commission of Registered Engineers, equivalent to an Advanced Master’s Degree in Engineering.

The school is located in the south of France, between Toulon and Hyères, on the French Riviera. It focuses on marine sciences and technologies while offering a solid background in engineering.

== Academics ==
The SeaTech engineering syllabus takes place over three years.

The first year is based on a multidisciplinary teaching covering all the fields of engineering such as mathematics, physics, mechanics, materials science, electronics, computer science, languages, economics, management, communication etc.

The school offers six majors to its students in second and third year:

- Marine Engineering
- Mechanical and Innovation Engineering
- Software Engineering
- Materials Engineering
- Modeling and Simulation Engineering
- Mechatronics and Robotics Engineering

== Admissions ==
The main admission to the engineering school requires a pass in a competitive entrance exam, for which students complete two years of intensive post-secondary education called Higher School Preparatory Classes (Classes Préparatoires aux Grandes Écoles).

Foreign students can join SeaTech via this traditional engineering studies route or via the exchange route.

== Academic Partnerships ==
The membership of the school in Polyméca, a French network of engineering schools composed of seven engineering schools teaching mechanics, offers the possibility to the pupils to make a double diploma in one of the schools of the network.

The students have the opportunity to achieve a Double Degree with Cranfield University in England, and with the Escola Politécnica da Universidade de São Paulo in Brazil.

== Industrial Partnerships ==
The school joins forces with industrial partners. The main associates are :

- Shipbuilding : Naval Group
- Industrial Solutions : CNIM
- IT : Sopra Steria

== Career Opportunities ==
This training leads students to numerous job opportunities at the national and international levels in such varied domains as offshore engineering, undersea robotics, oceanography, energy, environment, defense, transportation and information technology.

== Research Labs ==
Five laboratories are geographically located at SeaTech:

- Laboratory of Mechanical and Robotic Systems (COSMER).
- Laboratory of IT and Systems (LSIS).
- Laboratory of Material Sciences in Marine Environment (MAPIEM).
- Mediterranean Institute of Oceanography (MIO).
- Toulon Institute of Mathematics (IMATH).

== Student life ==
SeaTech has a wealth of student life which enables each student to express themselves through their interests.

- Student office “BDE” : Brings students together by organising major events.
- Student clubs : sports, arts, sailing, aero-modelling, robotic...
