= Jean-François Pontal =

French businessman

Jean-François René Pontal (born 17 April 1943) is a French businessman, and a former Chief Executive of Orange S.A.

== Early life ==
Child of the official Gaston Pontal, he has a degree in Engineering in 1966 from the Centre d'études supérieures des techniques industrielles (CESTI), now called Supméca, part of Polyméca.

== Career ==
Orange (UK) was bought by France Télécom in May 2000 for £25 billion. France Télécom changed its name to Orange S.A. He had worked at France Télécom since 1996.

=== Orange ===
He was Chief Executive (directeur général or PDG) of Orange (worldwide) from January 2001 until 24 March 2003.

== See also ==
- Graham Howe (businessman), his deputy chief executive at Orange.

Business positions
Preceded by	Chief Executive of Orange S.A. January 2001 – March 2003	Succeeded by Sol Trujillo
