= Bernard Ghillebaert =

French telecommunications engineer and businessman

Bernard Ghillebaert (born 17 January 1952) is a French telecommunications engineer and businessman, and former Chief Executive of Orange UK. He is importantly known for setting the telecommunication standards for text messaging in 1985.

== Early life ==
He was born in Strasbourg, the principal city and capital of the Alsace region of eastern France.

He went to the École Polytechnique et de Télécom in Paris, and the Centre National d'Études des Télécommunications.

== Career ==
He joined France Télécom in 1976. From 1982 he directed the GSM development and standardisation project for France Télécom. From 1988 he was GSM programme director for France Télécom Mobile.

=== Text messaging ===
With the German engineer Friedhelm Hillebrand, he created the standards for text messaging in 1984, resulting in February 1985 with the GSM (Groupe Spécial Mobile) standard, also known as Global System for Mobile Communications for the Short Message Service (SMS), now known as text messaging.

After the Integrated Services Digital Network (ISDN) standards had been fixed in the late 1970s, there were thoughts about making a public digital mobile communication network. Mobitex, a Public Access Mobile Radio network standard had been conceived in 1981, and put into operation in the mid-1980s. The cooperation programme between France and Germany was known as S900 (from the 900Mhz waveband, and was analogue) and was expected to be in operation by 1986. It was decided to create a digital mobile network, GSM, in 1984, and for this to be in operation by the end of the decade. A prototype digital system, DF900, would be in place before GSM was ready. The new GSM system would have a radio paging service. The Europe-wide Eurosignal paging service had been in operation since 1974. Germany introduced its C-Netz analogue mobile phone network in 1985, based on the C450 standard; it had a digital switching system and digital control channels, and could have implemented a short data message system.

In a meeting in late October 1984, the French part of the DF900 project submitted a proposal for the provision of an enhanced paging service, with diffusion of alphanumeric messages to mobile users with acknowledgment capabilities. The messaging system would be two-way, unlike paging systems. On 12 November 1984 at a meeting in London, this proposal became simply the transmission of short alphanumeric messages with acknowledgement capabilities.

=== Orange ===
He was the Chief Executive of Mobistar from 1995, a Belgian mobile phone network.

In November 2004 he became the Chief Executive of Orange UK, staying until November 2008.

== Personal life ==
He is married with three sons

Business positions
Preceded by John Allwood	Chief Executive of Orange (UK); November 2004 – May 2008	Succeeded by Tom Alexander
Preceded by	Chief Executive of Mobistar; 1995 – 2004	Succeeded by
