= Wilhelm Zangen =

German industrialist and supporter of the Nazi Party (1891–1971)

Wilhelm Zangen (born 30 September 1891 in Duisburg – died 25 November 1971 in Düsseldorf) was a German industrialist and supporter of the Nazi Party.

Zangen had a strong business brain and by his late 30s he was one of the leading figures in the German business world. In December 1934 he became chairman of Mannesmann mills in Düsseldorf, a role he held until 1957. In this position Zangen oversaw the use of slave labour in the company's tube rolling mills.

He joined the Nazi Party and SS in 1937 and was awarded the title Wehrwirtschaftsführer. Other positions he filled under the Nazis included head of the German Industry Association, vice-president of the Chamber of Industry and Commerce in Düsseldorf and deputy chair of the Berlin-based Reich Economic Chamber, as well as directorships of a number of companies.

After the war Zangen was briefly imprisoned for his use of slave labor and his involvement in arming the Nazi regime. He served only four months of his sentence. He continued with his role at Mannesmann, serving as overall company chairman from 1957 to 1966.

== Bibliography ==
- Wistrich, Robert S. (2001). Who's who in Nazi Germany (3 ed.). Routledge. ISBN 0-415-26038-8.
