= John Allwood =

British businessman

Charles John Allwood (born August 1951) is a British businessman, and a former Chief Executive of Orange UK.

== Early life ==
He was born in Doncaster and educated at Oundle School.

He received a degree in Economics & Statistics from the University of Exeter in 1973.

== Career ==
=== News International ===
In 1986 he became Finance Director of News International Newspapers, then Finance Director from 1989 to 1991 of Sky Television plc.

=== Trinity Mirror ===
From 1999 to 2000 he was Chief Executive of Trinity Mirror Group.

=== Orange ===
From 1991 to 1992 he had been Finance Director of Microtel Communications Ltd, which became Orange Personal Communications Services Ltd in April 1994. He became Chief Executive of Orange UK in December 2000.

=== Daily Telegraph ===
He worked with Telegraph Media Group from 2004 to 2007.

== Personal life ==
His first wife was Fay Harnan. They have a son (born 1982) and a daughter (born 1985). He has since remarried and lives in Somerset.

Business positions
Preceded by	Managing Director of Telegraph Media Group; 2004 – 2007	Succeeded by
Preceded by Hans Snook	Chief Executive of Orange (UK); December 2000 – October 2004	Succeeded by Bernard Ghillebaert
Preceded by David Montgomery	Chief Executive of Trinity Mirror; January 1999 – 2000	Succeeded by Philip Graf
