= Graham Butcher =

English cricketer (born 1981)

Personal information
- Full name: Graham Robert Butcher
- Born: 25 September 1981 (age 45); Epsom, Surrey, England
- Batting: Right-handed
- Bowling: Right-arm medium

Domestic team information
- Years: Team
- 2001–2003: Oxford University
- 2003: Oxford UCCE

Career statistics
Competition	First-class
Matches	3
Runs scored	30
Batting average	6.00
100s/50s	–/–
Top score	10
Catches/stumpings	–/–
- Source: Cricinfo, 10 January 2020

Graham Robert Butcher (born 25 September 1981) is an English former first-class cricketer.

Butcher was born at Epsom and was educated at Archbishop Tenison's Church of England High School in Croydon, before going up to Oriel College, Oxford. While studying at Oxford, he played first-class cricket for Oxford University on two occasions against Cambridge University in The University Matches of 2001 and 2003. He also made a single first-class appearance for Oxford UCCE against Middlesex at Oxford in 2003.
