= Tom Alexander (businessman) =

British businessman (born 1959)

- Born: Thomas Simon Alexander; 10 March 1959 (age 67)
- Occupation: Businessman
- Employer(s): Orange UK; EE
- Known for: Former Chief Executive of Orange UK and EE

Thomas Simon Alexander (born 10 March 1959) is a British businessman and former chief executive of Orange and T-Mobile.

== Early life ==
Alexander attended Millfield, the independent school, as a day scholar from 1971 to 1975.

== Career ==
=== Virgin Mobile ===
Alexander set up and founded Virgin Mobile, which was launched in November 1999 with his colleague from BT Cellnet, Jo Steel. He left Virgin Mobile in 2006.

=== EE ===
In 2007 Alexander became CEO of Orange UK and in September 2009 he was informed by his parent company of a plan (in which he was not initially involved) to merge Orange UK and T-Mobile UK to form EE Limited. He became the first Chief Executive of EE.

== Personal life ==
Alexander is twice married and has two children.

Business positions
Preceded by New company	Chief Executive of EE Ltd; July 2010 - July 2011	Succeeded by Olaf Swantee
Preceded by Bernard Ghillebaert	Chief Executive of Orange UK; June 2008 - June 2010	Succeeded by Company merged with T-Mobile UK
Preceded by New company	Chief Executive of Virgin Mobile; 1999 - 2006	Succeeded by
