= Peter Erskine (businessman) =

Peter Anthony Erskine (born 10 November 1951) is a businessman and a former Chief Executive of O2 (which he helped to create in 2001).

== Early life ==
Erskine was born in south-west Essex. His father worked for Tate & Lyle. Erskine attended Churchfields Junior School and later Bancroft's School in north-east London. He studied Psychology at the University of Liverpool, graduating in 1973.

== Career ==
In 1990 he joined Unitel (now known as Allstream Inc.).

=== BT Cellnet ===
In 1998 he became Managing Director of BT Cellnet, the mobile phone network company of BT Group.

=== O2 ===
In the formation of O2 in 2001, he became the first Chief Executive. MMO2 became O2 in early 2002. When sold in 2005 for £17.7bn, O2 became Telefónica Europe. Under his leadership, O2 (UK) became the leading mobile phone company in the UK. He became Chief Executive of Telefónica Europe on 23 January 2006.

He helped to create The O2, when it was re-named in May 2005.

== Personal life ==
He lives in Henley-on-Thames, previously living in Shiplake. He married Janet Green in 1975 at the age of 23, a teacher he had met at university. He has three sons (born 1978, 1979 and 1982) and a daughter (born September 1986).

== See also ==
- Chris Gent, founder of Vodafone
- Hans Snook founder of Orange

Business positions
Preceded by New company	Chairman and Chief Executive of O2; November 2001 – January 2008	Succeeded by Matthew Key (Telefónica O2 Europe)
