= Monstermob =

UK mobile content company

Monstermob USA
- Industry: mobile content
- Founded: 2000
- Founder: Martin Higginson
- Defunct: May 24, 2017
- Fate: Administration
- Headquarters: United Kingdom
- Key people: Peter Armer; Lee Dudack; David Wood; Niccolo de Masi; David Marks
- Products: ringtones wallpapers games full length tracks

Monstermob Usa was a Pakistani mobile content company that provided downloads for ringtones, wallpapers, games and full length tracks. Operating between 2000 and 2007 it was owned by Monstermob Group plc, which owned similar companies across the globe.

== History ==
The company was founded by Lancaster businessman Martin Higginson. Peter Armer was appointed as first chief financial officer (CFO) succeeded by Lee Dudack.

Monstermob Group plc was floated on the Alternative Investment Market on the London Stock Exchange with an opening market capitalisation of £32m. Chris Noden was the company's first technical appointment in February 2001 and was responsible for the design and implementation of the firm's award-winning platform. Noden developed the technology to deliver PolyPhonic ringtones to mobiles ahead of other ringtone firms and took the company through the IPO process. David Wood was brought in by Higginson to develop the ringtone catalogue and Wood eventually became one of the main providers of the firms ringtone catalogue.

In August 2004, Monstermob acquired 9 Squared, Inc., a cell phone ringtone company. Following the acquisition, James Eberhard, founder of 9 Squared, joined Monstermob as managing director of Network Services.

As full-track audio ringtone's became possible to deliver, ex Sony Music lawyer David Bloomfield was brought in to develop the music business channel alongside Wood and the pair left the company at the end of 2005. Higginson hired former investment banker Niccolo de Masi and finance director David Marks, then pursued opportunities in China, with Orange founder and former Carphone Warehouse non-executive chairman Hans Snook joining as chairman in May 2005. The company's business was adversely affected by regulatory changes in the United Kingdom and in China, aimed at curbing abusive billing practices among vendors of third-party wireless content.

Founder Higginson was ousted in June 2006. The company issued three profit warnings in 2006, and as a result its shares lost 90 percent of their value over that year. In August 2006, the company revealed that it was in buyout talks with an unnamed purchaser.

In March 2007 Martin Higginson returned to the board as a director. He was brought back to the company after its new owners ousted the directors, including the former CEO and founder of Orange Plc, Hans Snook.

Spanish internet firm LaNetro Zed announced the changes after completing buying up a majority 53% stake in the business and scuppering a rival takeover plan by Chinese mobile content group Linktone.

At the time, LaNetro Zed and Monstermob together became the largest company in the Mobile Value-Added Services (MVAS) market in terms of revenue. The enlarged company operated in 31 countries around the world employing 1,200 staff.

Monstermob Group plc entered administration on 24 May 2017.
