= Chris Gent =

British businessman (born 1948)

Sir Chris Gent
- Born: Christopher Charles Gent; 10 May 1948 (age 78); Beckenham, Kent, England
- Education: Tenison's School
- Occupation: Businessman
- Years active: 1971–present
- Title: Director of Vodafone Group plc (1985–96); CEO of Vodafone Group plc (1997–2003); Non-executive director of Lehman Brothers Holdings Inc. (2003–08); Non-executive chairman of GlaxoSmithKline plc (2004–2015); Non-executive director of Ferrari S.p.A. (2006–present)
- Spouse(s): Ex-wife (divorced) Kate, Lady Gent (m. 1999)
- Children: 2 daughters (via 1st marriage); 2 sons (via 2nd marriage)
- Website: Official Site of GlaxoSmithKline

Sir Christopher Charles Gent HonFREng (born 10 May 1948) is a British businessman, He is the former chief executive officer of Vodafone, a British multinational mobile phone company. Until 2015, he served as the non-exec chairman of GlaxoSmithKline, the world's fourth largest pharmaceutical company. According to the Financial Times on 15 August 2022, he was fined £80,000 by the FCA for insider trading.

== Early life ==
Born in 1948 in Bridgemary Hants, Gent was raised in Gosport, Hampshire. He attended Tenison's School, then a grammar school in Kennington. His father, who had served in the Royal Navy, died when he was at school. He is one of four brothers (Rod, Chris, Jeremy and Pete).

== Career ==
He first worked for the National Westminster Bank in 1971 as a management trainee, then as a computer services manager at Schroders. In 1979 he became the managing director of Baric, a company owned by ICL and Barclays. In 1985 Gent joined Racal Electronics' Vodafone subsidiary as managing director of British operations as Vodafone prepared to launch its retail mobile phone operations.

=== Vodafone ===
Gent was widely credited with transforming Vodafone from a small subsidiary of Racal, a British electronics company, into a global giant, and with engineering Vodafone's 178 billion pound ($212 billion) purchase of Germany's Mannesmann in 2000. He became its managing director in January 1985 and its chief executive officer (taking over from Sir Gerald Whent) in January 1997.

In 2001, Gent was an advocate of the United Kingdom joining the euro.

After retiring from Vodafone in July 2003, Gent was awarded the honorary title of company's president for life on his departure as a mark of his achievement in developing the company, until his resignation from that position in March 2006. The title carried no salary, nor any advisory responsibilities, but was a symbolic link to the business.

He was formerly chairman of GlaxoSmithKline, a British multinational pharmaceutical company, joining in June 2004, becoming chairman on 1 January 2005, a position he held until May 2015.

From October 2005 to October 2006 he served on the Tax Reform Commission, established by the then Shadow Chancellor of the Exchequer, George Osborne MP.

Gent was a non-executive director of Lehman Brothers from 2003 until its bankruptcy in 2008.

=== ConvaTec ===
In August 2022, The Financial Conduct Authority fined Sir Christopher Gent £80,000 for unlawfully disclosing inside information, in his former role as non-executive Chairman of ConvaTec Group Plc.

== Personal life ==
In 2006 Gent was awarded an honorary degree (Doctor of Laws) from the University of Bath. He received a knighthood for his services to the telecoms industry in the 2001 Queen's Birthday Honours. He was also appointed as a HonFREng of the Royal Academy of Engineering in 2004.

In March 2007 Gent called for a referendum on London's hosting of the 2012 Olympics. He was quoted as saying "I cannot see that the long-term economic benefit of hosting the Games outweighs the costs and the horrific burden on the taxpayer, particularly London rate-payers. The cost for them is going to be astronomically high."

Gent is an avid sports fan and enjoys golf, skiing and tennis. However, his real passion is cricket, having grown up next door to The Oval and he is well known to travel long distances to attend matches. He famously instigated the deal with Airtouch whilst on his mobile phone at the Sydney Cricket Ground. Vodafone sponsored the England cricket team for many years until 2007. He married Kate in July 1999 in Wokingham and they have two sons. He has two daughters from a former marriage. He lives in Newbury in Berkshire.

== See also ==
- Peter Erskine (businessman), founder of O2
- Hans Snook, founder of Orange
