= PowerBop =

Model of Apple computer

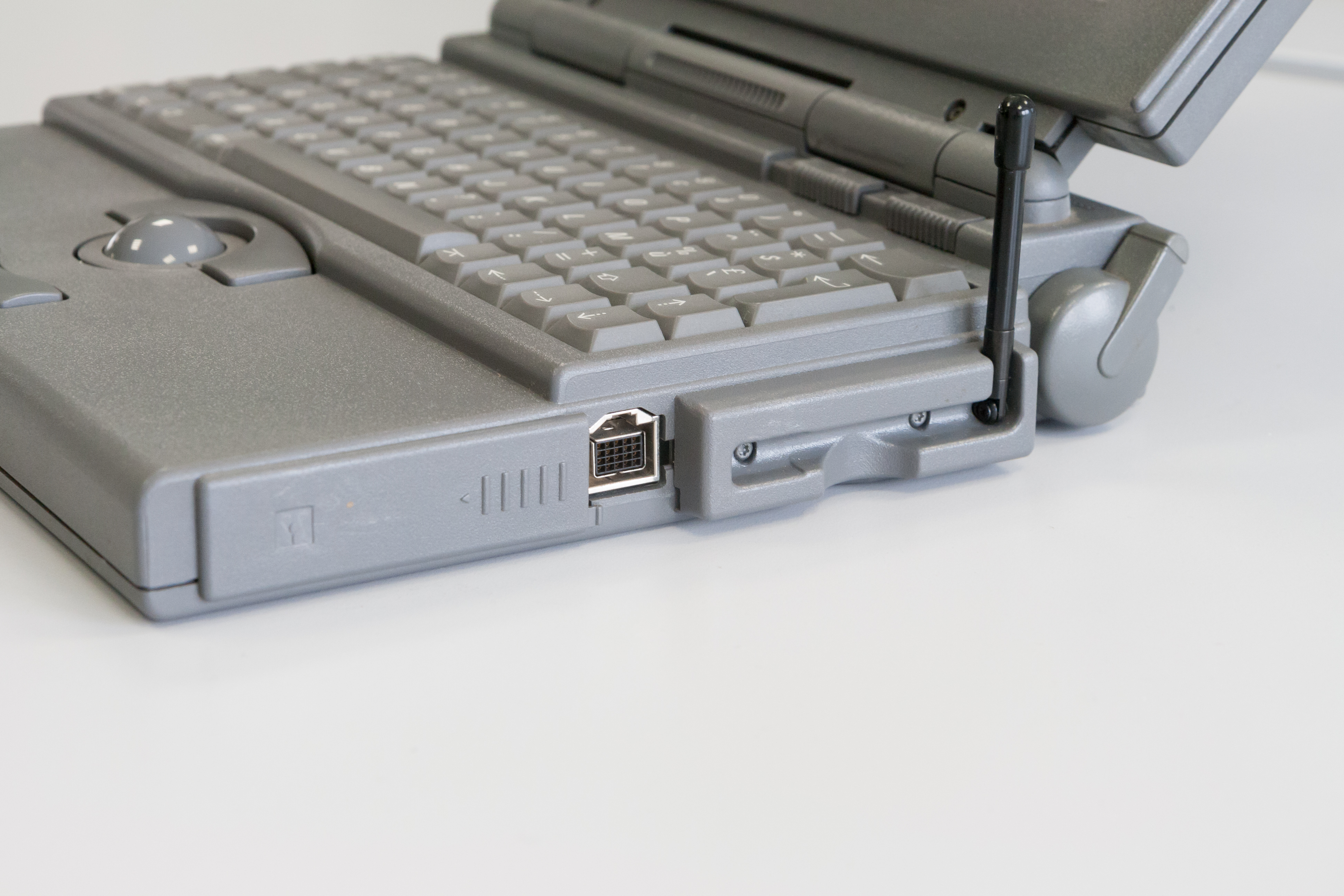
An Apple PowerBop with its antenna

The PowerBop is a computer model manufactured by Apple in 1993.

In 1993, Apple equips PowerBook 180s with France Télécom's Bi-Bop wireless connection system (CT2 standard). Apple modifies three models, all using the same casing: the PowerBook 160, the PowerBook 180 and the PowerBook 180c, equipped with a color screen.

This computer was built in only a few hundred units, met with no commercial success, and was quickly discontinued at the end of 1994. The last assembled units were sold out in 1995. According to sources, Apple manufactured around 650 modules, and only a fraction of the machines were sold with this module: some PowerBops were returned to the factory to replace the CT2 module with a floppy disk drive.

The computer was branded as the Macintosh PowerBop and was assembled in Ireland.
