= Arthur Hess (SA general) =

German craftsman and SA general (1891–1959)

Wehrwirtschaftsführer
- In office 7 February 1939 – 8 May 1945

Führer for Special Assignments, Supreme SA Leadership
- In office 15 April 1935 – 8 May 1945

SA-Führer in Plauen
- In office 1 February 1928 – 14 April 1935

Additional positions
- 1940–1945: Judge, People's Court
- 1935–1945: Judge, Reich Labor Court
- 1932–1936: Reichstag Deputy

Personal details
- Born: Ludwig Arthur Hess; 18 July 1891 Plauen, Kingdom of Saxony, German Empire
- Died: 20 June 1959 (aged 67) Ingolstadt, Bavaria, West Germany
- Party: Nazi Party
- Occupation: Shoemaker
- Civilian awards: Golden Party Badge; Nuremberg Party Day Badge

Military service
- Allegiance: German Empire
- Branch/service: Imperial German Army
- Years of service: 1911–1913; 1914–1918
- Rank: Vizefeldwebel
- Unit: 133rd (9th Royal Saxon) Infantry Regiment; 134th (10th Royal Saxon) Infantry Regiment
- Battles/wars: World War I
- Military awards: Iron Cross, 2nd class War Merit Cross, 1st and 2nd class

Ludwig Arthur Hess, Heß in German,( 18 July 1891 – 20 June 1959) was a German shoemaker by trade who became a Nazi Party politician and an SA-Obergruppenführer in the Supreme SA Leadership. He was elected as a Reichstag deputy from 1932 to 1936, and he was a national leader in the German crafts organization, becoming a Wehrwirtschaftsführer (military economic leader) during the Second World War.

== Early life and war service ==
Hess was born in Plauen, the son of a master shoemaker. He attended the public elementary school from 1898 until 1906 and then was apprenticed as an orthopedic shoemaker in his father's business until 1909, also attending classes at the local Berufsschule (vocational school). From 1911 to 1913, he performed military service with the Imperial German Army in the 133rd (9th Royal Saxon) Infantry Regiment, headquartered in Zwickau.

Upon the outbreak of the First World War, Hess rejoined the army as a one-year volunteer and was assigned to the 134th (10th Royal Saxon) Infantry Regiment, headquartered in Plauen. He fought on both the western and eastern fronts, serving as a combat orderly and as leader of a battalion orderly staff from August 1914 to Easter 1918. He became a non-commissioned officer, attaining the rank of Vizefeldwebel, and was awarded the Iron Cross, second class. After the war, Hess returned to work at his father's business as a master shoemaker, and became co-owner of Wilhelm Hess & Söhne Orthopädie-Shuhmacherei. From 1927 to 1933, he also taught professional shoemaking classes at the Gewerbeschule (trade school) in Plauen.

== Career in Nazi Germany ==
=== Sturmabteilung (SA) service ===
Hess first joined the Nazi Party (membership number 6,840) at the Plauen Ortsgruppe (local group) in March 1923. As a very early Party member, he later would be awarded the Golden Party Badge. He also joined the Party's paramilitary unit, the Sturmabteilung (SA), and became the Führer of the 2nd SA detachment in Plauen. In November 1923, he was arrested and briefly held in investigative detention. Sentenced to three months imprisonment, he was acquitted on appeal. During the period that the SA was banned in the wake of the failed Beer Hall Putsch, Hess joined the SA front organization, the Frontbann.

Hess rejoined the Party on 2 June 1925, after the lifting of the ban, and also resumed his SA leadership post in Plauen. On 1 February 1928, he was made an SA-Standartenführer and became the commander of SA-Standarte II in Plauen. Hess co-founded the Plauen Ortsgruppe of the National Socialist Teachers League in 1929. He attended the Party rally in Nuremberg in August 1929 and was awarded the Nuremberg Party Day Badge. He advanced to the leadership of SA-Brigade II in July 1930 and of SA-Untergruppe Plauen on 1 July 1932 when he was promoted to SA-Oberführer. Exactly a year later, he was promoted to SA-Brigadeführer, and he assumed the command of SA-Brigade 36 in Plauen on 1 September 1933. Shortly after his promotion to SA-Gruppenführer on 25 March 1934, the Röhm Putsch took place on 30 June. Hess subsequently requested a judicial proceeding in August to defend his honor against allegations that he had been involved in the alleged coup. He was acquitted on 25 September by a Special Court of the Supreme SA Leadership (OSAF). Hess left his field command when he was appointed to a staff position as an SA-Führer for Special Assignments in OSAF on 15 January 1935, holding this post until the fall of the Nazi regime in May 1945. He achieved his final SA promotion to SA-Obergruppenführer on 30 January 1941.

=== Reichstag deputy ===
In addition to his SA duties, Hess was also active in electoral politics. In the parliamentary election of July 1932, he was elected as a Nazi Party deputy to the Reichstag from electoral constituency 30 (Chemnitz–Zwickau). He was re-elected in the elections of November 1932, March 1933 and November 1933. In the Reichstag election on 29 March 1936, he ran again but did not receive a mandate.

=== Leadership of professional craft organizations ===
After the Nazi seizure of power, Hess was named the national leader of the Reich Professional Group for Master Orthopedic Shoemakers in Berlin and, on 17 May 1934, he was appointed the State Crafts Leader for the Saxony Treuhanderbezirk (trustee district). On 9 January 1935, he was appointed the Reich Guild Master of the Reich Guild Association for the Master Shoemaker Craft. This appointment also conferred an honorary judgeship on the Reich Labor Court in Leipzig. On 14 May 1935, Hess was named the chief of liaison between OSAF and the Reich Artisan Master, Wilhelm Georg Schmidt. In addition, from 1942, he was the Artisan Master's Representative for Education and Instruction of Artisans, and served as the director of the Master Shoemaking School. He was named a Wehrwirtschaftsführer (military economic leader) on 7 February 1939 and, in May 1940, he was also granted a five-year appointment as a lay judge and assessor at the People's Court. He would hold all these posts for the remainder of Nazi Germany's existence.

Hess was awarded the War Merit Cross 1st and 2nd class during the Second World War. Little is documented about Hess in the post-war years, and he died in Ingolstadt in June 1959.

== SA ranks ==
SA ranks
Date	Rank
1 February 1928	SA-Standartenführer
1 July 1932	SA-Oberführer
1 July 1933	SA-Brigadeführer
25 March 1934	SA-Gruppenführer
30 January 1941	SA-Obergruppenführer

== Published works ==
- Wahrheiten über die gegenwärtige Methodik der Beschuhung kranker Füsse (1938)
- Grundsätzliche Richtlinien für die Berufserziehung im Schuhmacherhandwerk (1938)

== Sources ==
- Campbell, Bruce (1998). The SA Generals and the Rise of Nazism. Lexington: University Press of Kentucky. ISBN 978-0-813-12047-8.
- Information about Arthur Hess (SA general) in the Reichstag database
- Miller, Michael D.; Schulz, Andreas (2015). Leaders of the Storm Troops. Vol. 1. Solihull, England: Helion & Company. ISBN 978-1-909-98287-1.
- Stockhorst, Erich (1985). 5000 Köpfe: Wer War Was im 3. Reich. Arndt. p. 193. ISBN 978-3-887-41116-9.
