= Kienzle Computer =

Kienzle Computer was a German manufacturer of data processing equipment. Its official name was Kienzle Apparate GmbH (Kienzle precision equipment), whose main products were instrumentation for commercial vehicles (particularly taximeters and tachographs). It was spun off from the Kienzle clock factory (Kienzle Uhrenfabriken AG) in 1929. In the 1980s it was merged with Mannesmann as Mannesmann-Kienzle, and in 1991 it was sold to the Digital Equipment GmbH and was renamed Digital-Kienzle Computer Systeme.
