= Supmicrotech =

French school of engineering

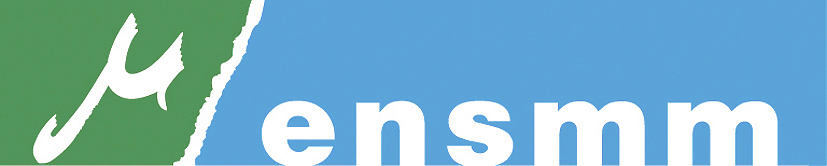
- Type: Public, Graduate engineering
- Established: 1902
- Affiliations: Polyméca; Conférence des Grandes Écoles
- Students: 900
- Location: Besançon, France; 47°15′3.398″N 5°59′39.223″E
- Website: www.supmicrotech.fr

Supmicrotech (officially, the École nationale supérieure de mécanique et des microtechniques) is a French school of engineering. It is part of Polyméca, a network of schools focusing on mechanical engineering.

== History ==
The school was founded in 1902 by the Université de Franche-Comté as Laboratoire de Chronométrie. In 1961, it turned to École nationale supérieure de chronométrie et micromécanique (ENSCM). Since the school is established in an area with a strong legacy on horology, Supmicrotech is deeply dedicated to the design and manufacturing of micro-mechanical devices and robotics.

== Location ==
It is located in the city of Besançon, France eastern area (by car, 4 hours from Paris, 2 hours and a half from Strasbourg and 2 hours and a half from Lyon).

== Curriculum ==
=== Study in France ===
The school educates 250 engineers every year on 6 fields:

- Materials science
- Mechatronics
- Mechanical engineering
- Micromechanics
- Optoelectronics and Microelectromechanical systems
- Industrial engineering

Students can choose to spend their last year within Supmicrotech or in one of the schools of the Polyméca network.

=== Study abroad ===
Supmicrotech has concluded a partnership with several universities worldwide:

- Technische Universität, Vienne, Austria
- Institut National d’Informatique, Alger, Algeria
- Federal University of Uberlândia, Brazil
- Universidade Polytechnique, São Paulo, Brazil
- École Polytechnique de Montréal, Montréal, Canada
- École de technologie supérieure, Montréal, Canada
- Université Laval, Québec, Canada
- Southwest Jiaotong University, Chengdu, China
- Shanghai Jiaotong University, China
- Technische Universität Ilmenau, Germany
- Hochschule Karlsruhe, Germany
- Université des Sciences et Techniques de Bucarest, Hungaria
- Indian Institute of Technology Kanpur, India
- Università degli Studi di Napoli Federico II, Italy
- Politecnico di Torino, Italy
- Politecnico di Milano, Italy
- Tokyo Denki University, Japan
- Ecole Nationale de l'Industrie Minérale, Rabat Morocco
- Université Technique, Cluj-Napoca, Romania
- Université Valahia, Targoviste, Romania
- Russian Academy of Sciences, Moscou, Russia
- Ivanovo State University of Chemistry and Technology, Russia
- Saint Petersburg State University of Aerospace Instrumentation, Saint Petersburg, Russia
- Escola Tecnica Superior d’Enginyeria Barcelona, Spain
- University of Oviedo, Spain
- University of Vigo, Spain
- University of Wales, Newport, United Kingdom
- Ohio State University, Columbus, USA

It also belongs to the N+i international network.
