= Archbishop Tenison's Church of England High School, Croydon =

Archbishop Tenison's School

Location
- Selborne Road; Croydon, Greater London, CR0 5JQ; England
- Coordinates: 51°22′10″N 0°04′55″W

Information
- Type: Voluntary aided school
- Motto: Tenaciter
- Religious affiliation: Church of England
- Established: 1714; 312 years ago
- Founder: Thomas Tenison
- Local authority: Croydon
- Department for Education URN: 101811 Tables
- Ofsted: Reports
- Chair of Governors: R.Mash
- Headmaster: R. Parrish
- Staff: 90
- Gender: Coeducational
- Age: 11 to 18
- Enrolment: c. 800
- Houses: Fisher (yellow), Ramsey (blue), Temple (red), Becket (green), Wood (purple)
- Colour: Blue
- Publication: Tenaciter
- Principle Sports: Association Football, Rugby Union, Netball, Basketball, Athletics
- Former Pupils: Old Tenisonians
- Website: http://www.archten.croydon.sch.uk

Archbishop Tenison's Church of England High School, commonly known as Tenison's, is a co-educational 11-18, voluntary aided, school in the London Borough of Croydon, England, part of the educational provision of the Anglican Diocese of Southwark and Croydon Council. It is a specialist Mathematics and Computing College.

== History ==
Several schools were founded by Thomas Tenison, an educational philanthropist, in the late 17th and early 18th centuries. In 1714, Tenison, by then Archbishop of Canterbury, founded a school for some "ten poor boys and ten poor girls" at North End, Croydon, on a site which is now close to Croydon’s shopping centre. Just over 300 years and three sites later, it is thought that the School is the oldest surviving continuously mixed-sex school in the world.

In 1792 increased endowments allowed the school to expand into a new brick built building next to the original school house, and to increase the roll to 14 boys and 14 girls.

Due to the hostilities of the Second World War, the School was moved away from the dangers of the Blitz in South London and relocated to Craigmore Hall in the countryside near Crowborough, East Sussex, with pupils evacuated and billeted with the local populace. After the War, the School returned to Croydon on a site on Selsdon Road, and Craigmore Hall returned to private use.

The School now occupies a site established in 1959 in a residential area of Croydon – Park Hill, ten minutes' walk from East Croydon station. Since 1959, the facilities have been augmented by the building of a Sixth Form Centre, an Art block, and Geography and Technology Centres.

== Houses ==
Pupils at Tenison's are organised in a manner typical of British schools - they are sorted into a house system. These houses determine the colour of a pupil's mitres on their school tie. Pupils are actively a part of the house system from years 7 to 10, and compete annually for the House Points Cup and the Inter-House Cup (a sporting competition). Involvement within the house system lessens in year 11; however, there have been calls to put greater emphasis on the house system, and inter-house competitions, for all year groups.

The houses at Tenison's are named after famous Archbishops of Canterbury, and include:

- Fisher
- Ramsey
- Temple
- Becket
- Wood

== Sport ==
The school has no on-site grass playing fields but has the use of nearby Lloyd Park and facilities at nearby Coombe Lodge, providing pitches for both football and cricket. In 2002 the school opened an all-weather surface on the School site which enables the provision of tennis, basketball, netball and five-a-side football, as well as four other on-site tennis courts.

== Old Tenisonians ==
Notable Old Tenisonians include:

- Graham Butcher, first-class cricketer
- Lynne Owens, Director General of the National Crime Agency

== See also ==
- Archbishop Tenison's School in Lambeth
