= Friedhelm Hillebrand =

German engineer

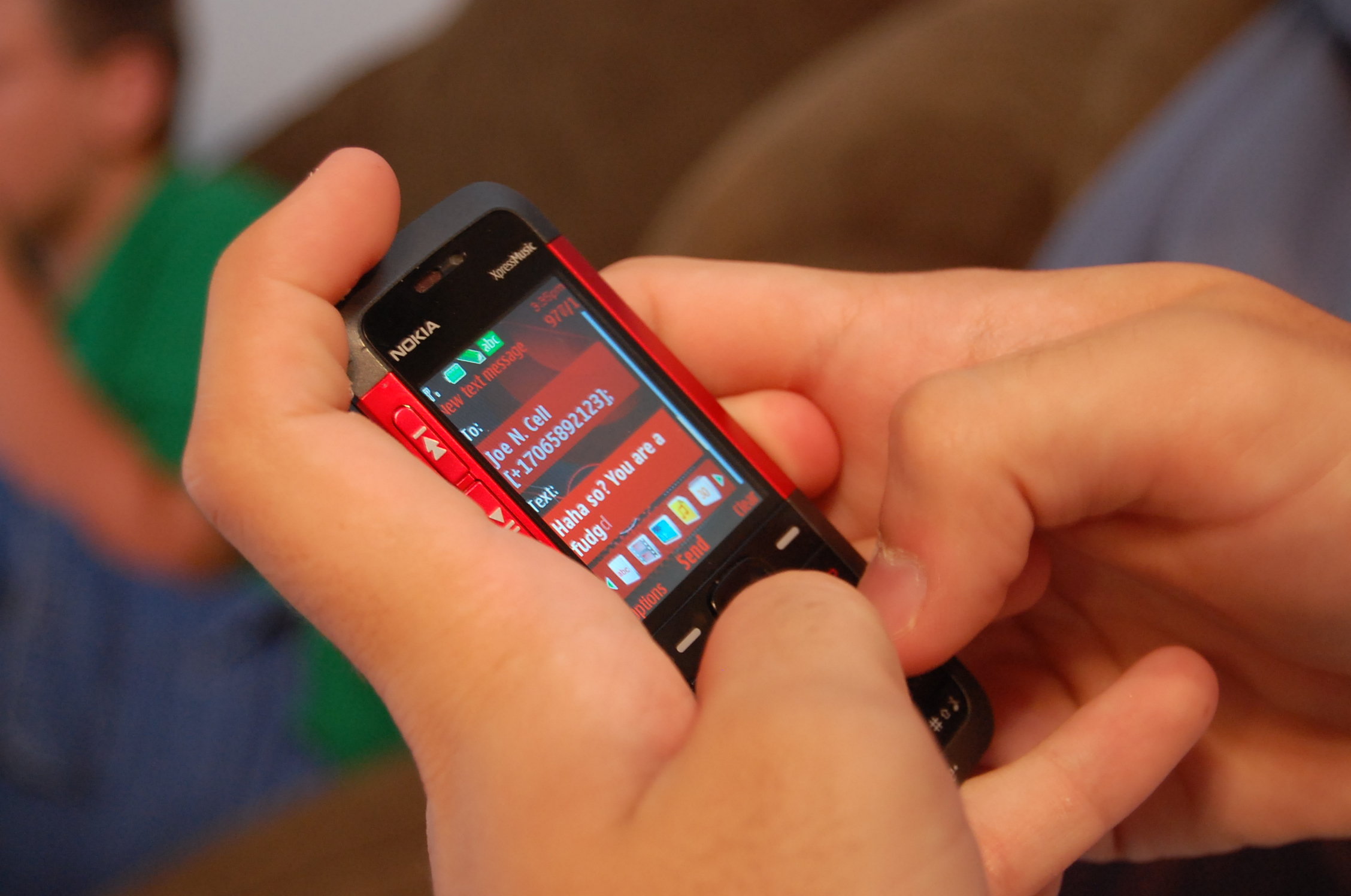
A person sending an SMS text message

Friedhelm Hillebrand is a German engineer who has been influential in setting mobile telecommunications standards. Hillebrand is one of the inventors of the SMS, as he and Frenchman Bernard Ghillebaert created the concept for the service in 1984. As chairman of the non-voice services committee for the Global System for Mobile Communications standard in 1985, he conducted experiments to determine the length needed for text messages and found that 160 characters was sufficient. This subsequently became the basis for the 140 character limit formerly used by Twitter. Hillebrand was inducted into the Wireless Hall of Fame in 2017 for his accomplishments in the wireless industry.

Hillebrand was born in Warstein in 1940, and as a child, was active in amateur radio. He gained a master's degree in telecommunications in 1968, then started his career with the German post office, which was then also responsible for telephones. After retiring from that career, he started a consultancy advising on technology patents.
