= Chris Joseph (autobiographer) =

- Born: Christopher John Joseph; 19 February 1958 (age 68); United Kingdom
- Education: English Martyrs School and Sixth Form College, University of Liverpool
- Occupation: Advertising executive
- Notable work: Zest!Seller (Author)
- Title: Former chair of Middlesbrough Official Supporters Club (2014–2015)
- Movement: SAFE (Struggle Against Financial Exploitation)

Chris Joseph is a British advertising executive and the author of his autobiography "Zest! Seller.”

== Early life and education ==
Joseph attended St Francis Grammar School and English Martyrs Comprehensive School in Hartlepool. He left his BA Hons French degree at the University of Liverpool to become a priest, worked as a nightclub doorman, and at an iron foundry Head Wrightson where he survived an industrial accident but lost his right arm, and then completed a changed degree at the University of Liverpool in French and communication studies before beginning a career in advertising.

== Advertising career ==
After joining the small advertising agency GDA, rapid promotion to new business director and subsequently being headhunted by Saatchi & Saatchi, he set up agency, Hook Advertising Limited, which he turned into an award-winning company with a £10 million a year turnover. The name comes from the solid silver hallmarked hook which replaced the hand and right arm he lost in his industrial accident.

Although clients of Hook Advertising included Fujitsu and Schwarzkopf, its biggest client was the Barclays Philips Shell consortium (BYPS). Joseph created and designed the name and logo for Rabbit, a telephone system and then pitched and won the £4 million advertising contract from BYPS. When Rabbit was later sold to Hutchison, the latter requested an assignment of the Rabbit copyright from Hook Advertising which refused, believing it not to be covered by the contract. After Hutchison severed the contract it sued Hook Advertising. Four years of litigation followed where Hook Advertising also sued Barclays, Shell, Philips and Hutchison, and in addition Barclays sued Hook Advertising.

- Hutchinson Personal Communications Ltd v. Hook Advertising Ltd [1995] FSR 365
- Hutchinson Personal Communications Ltd v. Hook Advertising Ltd (No. 2) [1996] FSR 549

In January 1996, Mrs Justice Arden ruled that clients cannot take creative work pitched to them speculatively without a prior agreement, but that in Hook Advertising's enthusiasm to win the Rabbit deal it had effectively traded its rights to the logo and made such a preliminary deal. This ruling replaced the legal precedent set in 1928 in the Hycolite case (Drabble (Harold) Ltd v. Hycolite Manufacturing Co. [1928] 44 TLR 264) that the conduct of the parties may imply a licence to use a copyright work without the need for it to be in writing. Despite the legal battle, there was also an out of court settlement in which Hook Advertising received more than £1 million.

== Illness ==
Joseph had bipolar disorder, a psychiatric illness with cyclical manic and depressive episodes. He was sectioned several times between 1988 and 2002 although he has now been well and not relapsed for 18 years. During some of his manic periods he squandered money, including buying 200 FA football tickets worth over £5,000 for a match involving his favourite team Middlesbrough F.C. He then gave them all away to children he did not know outside McDonald's.

== SAFE (Struggle Against Financial Exploitation) ==
While fighting the litigation Joseph founded the group SAFE (Struggle Against Financial Exploitation). Its purpose was as a high-profile action group to demonstrate and draw attention to systemic fraud and deception by financial institutions upon unsuspecting individuals throughout the UK. SAFE caused embarrassment, with its demonstrations and creative but legal advertising campaigns and publicity stunts against Barclays Bank, the Bank of England, the Treasury and Downing Street. At its peak it had a membership of 2,000.

== Publications ==
- Manicdotes: There's Madness in his Method (2008)
- Zest!Seller (2024)
