= Polyméca =

French network of engineering schools

Polyméca is a French network of engineering schools composed of seven grandes écoles teaching engineering and mechanics. This partnership enables students from different schools in the network to complete their final year of study at another of the network's schools, and to graduate from that school as well as from their home school.

== Members ==
- The Supméca
- The SeaTech
- The École d'ingénieurs ENSIL-ENSCI
- The École nationale supérieure de techniques avancées de Bretagne (ENSTA Bretagne)
- The École nationale supérieure de mécanique et d'aérotechnique (ISAE-ENSMA)
- The École nationale supérieure de mécanique et des microtechniques (ENSMM)
- The École nationale supérieure d’électronique, informatique, télécommunications, mathématique et mécanique de Bordeaux (ENSEIRB-MATMECA)
