= CT2 =

1990s cordless telephony standard

CT2 is a cordless telephony standard that was used in the early 1990s to provide short-range proto-mobile phone service in some countries in Europe and in Hong Kong. It is considered the precursor to the more successful DECT system. CT2 was also referred to by its marketing name, Telepoint.

== Overview ==
CT2 is a digital FDMA system that uses time-division duplexing technology to share carrier frequencies between handsets and base stations. Features of the system are:

- Standardized on 864–868 MHz
- 500 frames/second (alternately base station and handset)
- 100 kHz carriers
- 32 kbit/s ADPCM voice channel compression
- 10 mW maximum power output
- GFSK data encoding
- Up to 100 metre (300 ft) range

Unlike DECT, CT2 was a voice-only system, though like any minimally-compressed voice system, users could deploy analog modems to transfer data; in the early 1990s, Apple Computer sold a CT2 modem called the PowerBop to make use of France's Bi-Bop CT2 network. Although CT2 is a microcellular system, fully capable of supporting handoff, unlike DECT it does not support "forward handoff", meaning that it has to drop its former radio link before establishing the subsequent one, leading to a sub-second dropout in the call during the handover.

== Deployment and usage ==
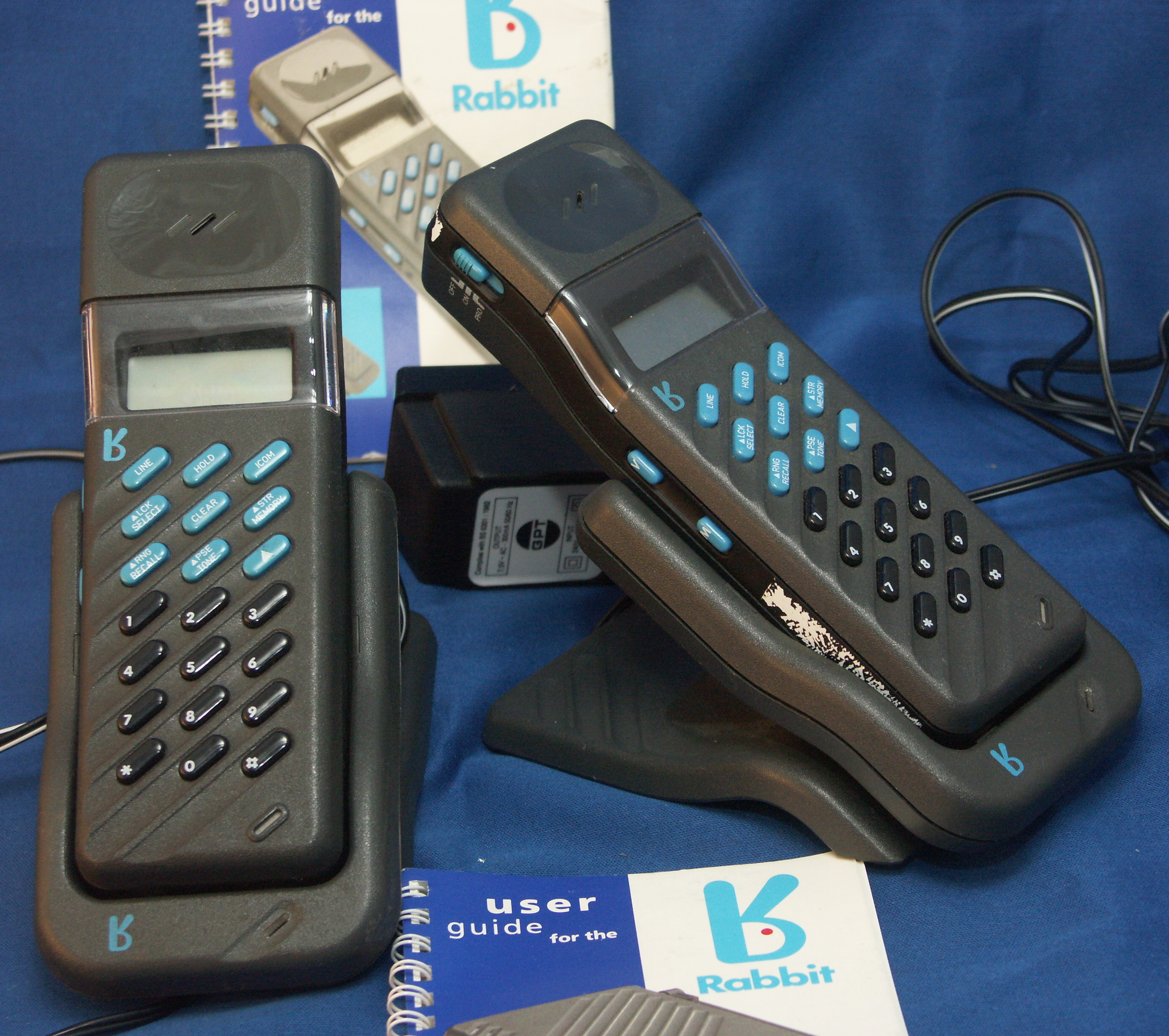
Rabbit handsets and chargers

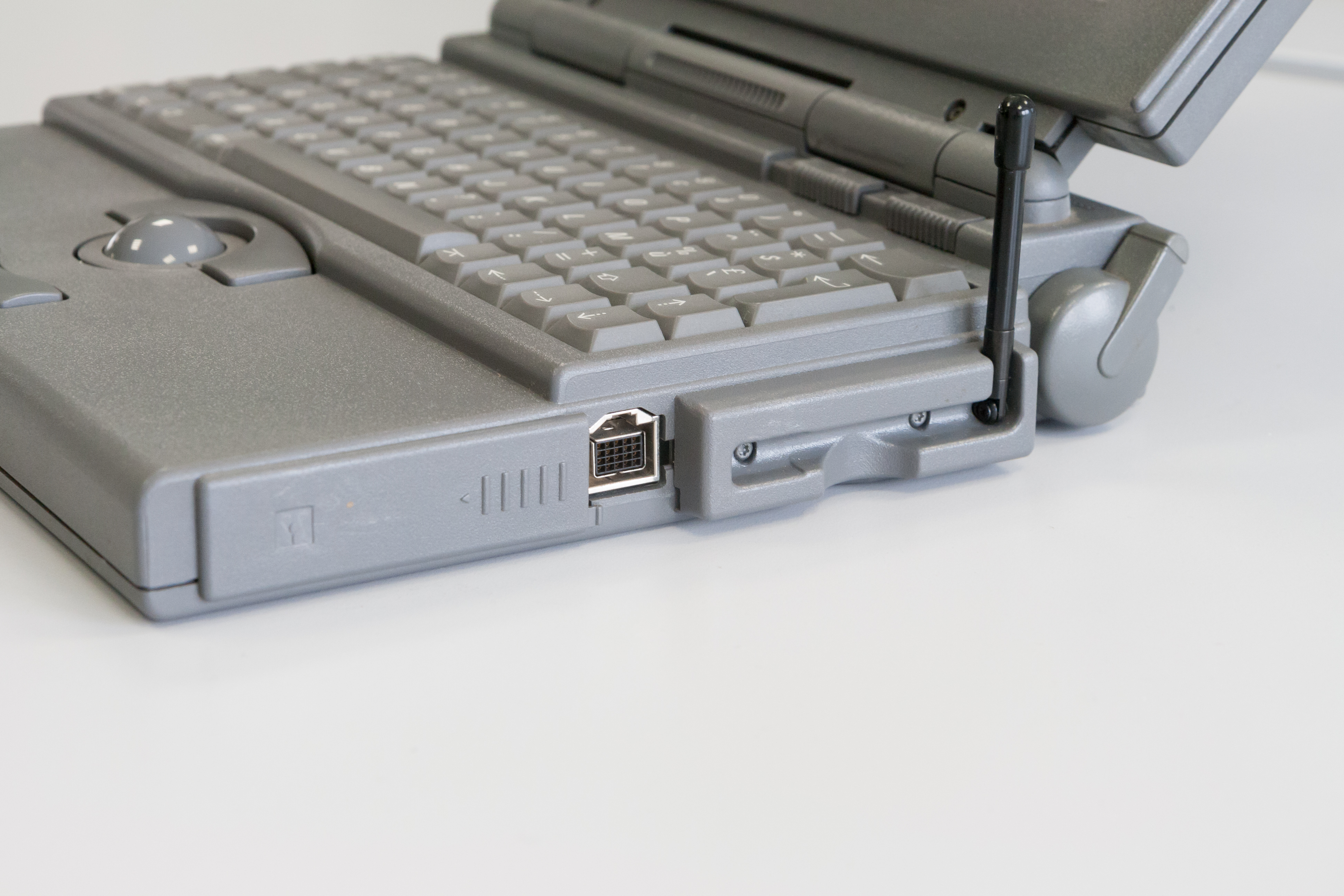
Apple PowerBop, a variant of the PowerBook incorporating a CT2-compatible modem for use with the Bi-Bop network

Time Out magazine, London, April 1988: Ferranti ZonePhone

CT2 was deployed in a number of countries, including Britain and France. In Britain, the Ferranti Zonephone system was the first public network to go live in 1989, and the much larger Rabbit network – backed by Hong Kong's Hutchison Telecommunications – operated from 1992 to 1993. In France, the Bi-Bop network ran from 1991 to 1997. In the Netherlands, Dutch incumbent PTT deployed a CT2-based network called Greenpoint from 1992 to 1999; in the first year it used the name and mascot Kermit but royalties proved prohibitively large and the mascot was dropped. The service continued under the brand name Greenhopper, with at one time over 60,000 subscribers. In Finland, the Pointer service was available for a short time in the 1980s before being superseded by Nordic Mobile Telephone (NMT). Since 31 December 2008, CTA1 and CTA2 based phones are forbidden in Germany.

Outside Europe, the system achieved a certain amount of popularity in Hong Kong with three operators offering service from 1991, until licenses were terminated in 1996. A CT2 service was offered in Singapore from 1993 to 1998 by Telecommunications Equipment under the brand name Callzone, using Motorola's Silverlink 2000 Birdie handset.

Typical CT2 users were sold a handset and base station which they could connect to their own home telephone wiring. Calls via the home base station would be routed via the home telephone line and in this configuration the system was identical to a standard cordless phone, for both incoming and outgoing calls.

Once out of range of the home, the CT2 user could find signs indicating a network base station in the area, and make outgoing calls (but not receive calls) using the network base station. Base stations were in a variety of places, including high-streets and other shopping areas, gas stations, and transport hubs such as rail stations. In this configuration, callers would be charged a per-minute rate which was higher than if they made calls from home, but not as high as conventional cellular charges.

The advantages to the user were that the rates were generally lower than cellular, and that the same handset could be used at home and away from home. The disadvantages, compared to cellular, were that many networks did not deliver incoming calls to the phones (Bi-Bop was an exception), and that their areas of use were more limited.

There are no known open CT2 networks still running.

== Similar systems ==
Japan's Personal Handyphone System, another system based upon microcells, is a direct analog of CT2 and has achieved a much greater level of success. PHS is a full microcellular system with hand-off, better range, and more features.

The DECT system is CT2's successor, and also supports full microcellular service and data. However, to date DECT has been used to provide commercial mobile-phone like service only in Italy in 1997-8 (the FIDO network).

Canada adopted an enhanced version of CT2, known as CT2Plus, in 1993, operating in the 944–948.5 MHz band. CT2Plus class 2 systems benefited from the use of common signalling channels and offered multi-cell hand-off as well as tracking of devices. Incoming calls could be received anywhere within a multi-cell system. Nortel Networks offered a private branch exchange system based on the standard which was specified in Department of Communication document RSS-130 Annex 1.

In the United States, a system similar to DECT and PHS called PACS was developed but never deployed commercially.

CT2, as used in Europe and Hong Kong, required adherence to the MPT 1322 and MPT 1334 technical standards. Most striking was the use of TDD (time-division duplex) channels where one radio channel carried both sides of a duplex telephone conversation. This solved the problem of different propagation paths between two widely separated channels (up to 45 MHz in some cellular systems), but also placed an upper limit on the range of CT-2 signaling, since the speed of light (and radio signals) prevented long transmission paths. However, the use of TDD made available many frequency bands for CT-2 use, since a "paired" return path was not needed.

An American company, Cellular 21, Inc. (later to become Advanced Cordless Technologies, Inc.) headed by broadcaster Matt Edwards, petitioned the FCC to permit the use of CT2 technology in the US. ACT built two active test systems which were located in Monticello, New York (outdoor), and outside and inside the South Street Seaport complex in lower Manhattan. The Monticello public field trials used Timex technology which was incompatible with the trans-European standard, while the South Street Seaport indoor test used equipment from Ferranti, GPT, and Motorola, which at the time manufactured CT2 equipment for the Singapore and Hong Kong markets. GPT and Motorola both provided CT2 equipment for the Rabbit system rollout (GPT handset and charger shown above). All the testing was under an FCC Experimental license. The ACT/Cellular 21 "Petition for Rulemaking" (RM-7152), along with a later petition by Millicom, became the basis of the FCC's PCS initiative (FCC GEN Docket 90-314) which resulted in the allocation of frequencies in the 1.7 to 2.1 GHz band as spectrum expansion for the crowded 800 MHz cellular band. The FCC used the acronym PCS to designate Personal Communications Services, separate and distinct from cellular service which was 800 MHz analog at the time. PCS was to be digital-only, and has progressed through several "generations" (mostly marketing designations) such as G3 and G4.

== See also ==
- CT1
- Wikipedia France: Bibop
