= Pointer (wireless phone) =

Pointer was a mobile phone network provided by Finnish company Posti- ja telelaitos (now TeliaSonera Finland) for a short time in the 1980s. The technology was similar to that of standard cordless phones, which could be used via hotspots around Finland, at least to make calls. Pointer phones lacked roaming capability. A sign on the wall would show the passers-by that a Pointer hotspot was available.

Hotspots were placed at post offices and further expansion was planned. However, NMT phones were rapidly becoming popular and displaced the Pointer before it had time to become established.

Some signs showing Pointer hotspots still exist, such as on the wall of a post office on Mechelininkatu Street in Helsinki.
