= Eurosignal =

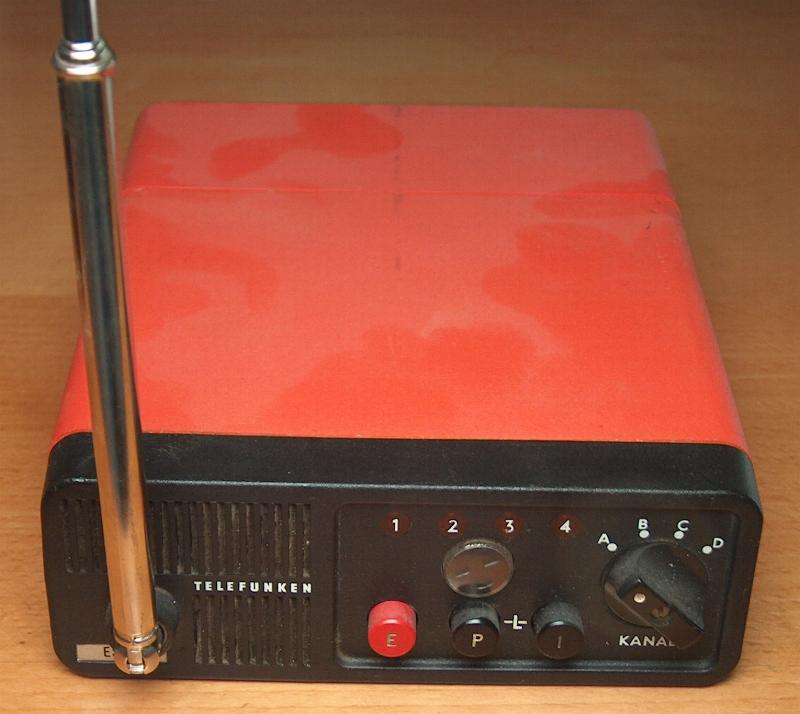
Eurosignal receiver

Eurosignal was a European paging system in operation between 1974 and 1997. Transmissions were broadcast between 87.3 and 87.5 MHz in FM, so that their characteristic modulations could be heard on mainstream FM radio receivers.

== History ==
Eurosignal was introduced in Germany in 1974, France in 1975, and Switzerland in 1985. In France and Switzerland, transmissions were stopped on 31 December 1997 and 1 April 1998, respectively.

== Operation ==
=== Utilization ===
A receiver could handle up to four phone numbers. It included an acoustic signal and four optical signals that indicated which of the four numbers called. Eurosignal did not allow other transmissions; the actual four telephone numbers had to be established previously, and use of the signal was limited to telephones. Eurosignal numbers were not listed in a directory in order to limit abuse. Eurosignal had a major advantage over other radiotelephone networks due to its costs, which were about 10% of ordinary phone lines. It also enjoyed a larger coverage area compared to FM radio.

=== Broadcast network ===
Data was transmitted by radio VHF. The following four channels were used.

- Channel A: 87.340 MHz
- Channel B: 87.365 MHz
- Channel C: 87.390 MHz
- Channel D: 87.415 MHz

Germany used channels A and B, France used all four, and Switzerland used only channel D. The distribution network was composed of terrestrial transmitters with power of up to 2 kilowatts.

=== Modulation ===
Eurosignal was based on audio transmissions, at first using amplitude modulation, later using frequency modulation. In general, each digit of the phone number produced a particular frequency. Thus, the number 123456 resulted in the issuance of the frequencies f1, f2, f3, f4, f5, f6. If a number was repeated, its second occurrence was replaced by a particular frequency indicating repetition, fr. For example, the number 111111 was encoded by f1, fr, f1, fr, f1, fr. Two phone numbers were separated by the frequency fi for at least 0.22 seconds, with a time per called number of 0.82 seconds.

The frequencies used were as follows:

Meaning	Notation	Frequency
Number 0	f _{0}	979.8 Hz
Number 1	f _{1}	903.1 Hz
Number 2	f _{2}	832.5 Hz
Number 3	f _{3}	767.4 Hz
Number 4	f _{4}	707.4 Hz
Number 5	f _{5}	652.0 Hz
Number 6	f _{6}	601.0 Hz
Number 7	f _{7}	554.0 Hz
Number 8	f _{8}	510.7 Hz
Number 9	f _{9}	470.8 Hz
Free	f _{i}	1,153.1 Hz
Repeat	f _{r}	1,062.9 Hz

=== In popular culture ===
The distinctive audio tones of Eurosignal were sampled by Loopzone in "Mega htz" from 1993, Karl Bartos in "Overdrive" on his 1993 album Esperanto, as well as by the French electronica duo Air on their 1996 single B-side "Les Professionnels", available on their compilation album Premiers Symptômes (1997).
