= Klaus Esser =

German lawyer and businessman

Klaus Esser is a German lawyer and former CEO of Mannesmann. He current serves as an Advisory Director at General Atlantic.

== Career ==
In 1999, Esser was appointed as CEO of Mannesmann, where he oversaw the firm's hostile takeover by Vodafone. Despite his initial opposition to Vodafone's acquisition attempts, Esser ultimately agreed to a price of $180 billion. Immediately following the buyout, Esser received a bonus payment worth approximately $15 million. The payment provoked outrage in Germany, where executive salaries remained lower than in Britain or the United States.

== Criminal Trial ==
Shortly after the acquisition, German prosecutors launched a criminal investigation into Esser's conduct to determine whether the promise of redundancy payments by Vodafone had influenced Esser's decision to approve the deal. Along with six other former managers of the company, he was charged with criminal breach of trust. Ultimately, Esser and his co-defendants were acquitted by Düsseldorf's regional court.

In 2005, prosecutors launched an appeal in Germany's federal court, describing the financial award given to Esser as "unique in its level." The case culminated in a settlement, with Esser paying 1.5 million euros in return for prosecutors dropping the charges levied against him.
