= Rabbit (telecommunications) =

Telepoint service

- Industry: Telecommunications
- Founded: 1992, in Manchester, UK
- Defunct: 1993
- Fate: Closed
- Successor: Orange
- Owner: Hutchison Telecommunications International Limited, Hutchison Whampoa

Rabbit was a British location-specific (Telepoint) telephone service backed by Hutchison, which later created the Orange GSM mobile network, followed by 3. The Rabbit network was the best-known of four such services introduced in the 1980s, the others being BT Phonepoint, Mercury Callpoint and Zonephone. Although Hutchison received a licence for Rabbit in 1989, the service was not launched until May 1992. Telepoint services such as Rabbit allowed subscribers to carry specially designed (CT2) home phone handsets with them and make outgoing calls whenever they were within 100 metres (330 ft) of a Rabbit transmitter.

== Rollout ==
The initial network only supported outgoing calls, but offered paging and messaging facilities as standard on all customer accounts. The service was rolled out after extensive tests with 1,000 users and 2,000 base stations located across the UK.

Original plans were for 12,000 base stations to be placed around the UK by December 1992. The service was launched in Greater Manchester in May 1992 with the entire city centre of Manchester covered with Rabbit base stations. The service was then rolled out to the rest of the North of England and there was nationwide coverage by the autumn of 1993. At the height of Rabbit's operations, there were 12,000 base stations and 10,000 customers in the UK.

== Closure ==
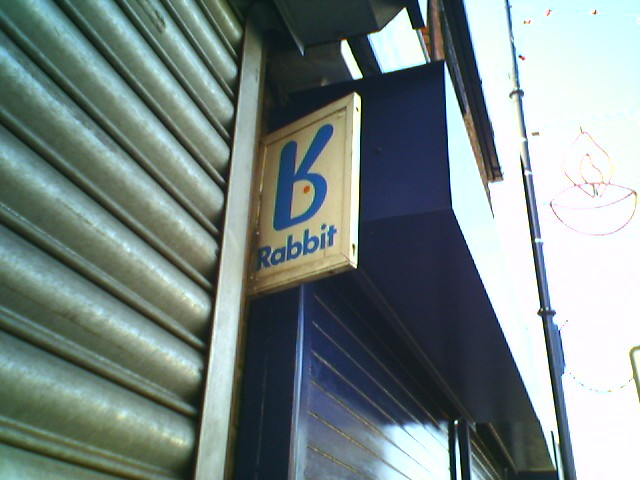
Rabbit base station sign, Penny Meadow, Ashton-Under-Lyne, Greater Manchester

The service ceased in December 1993, only 20 months after being launched. Rabbit had 2,000 subscribers at the time the service closed. The failure of Rabbit can be mainly attributed to the fall in cost of analogue mobile phones from Cellnet and Vodafone, which also accepted incoming calls. The imminent conversion of these mobile phone networks to the digital GSM standard sealed Rabbit's fate. Hutchison Whampoa lost around $183 million from the failure of Rabbit but later went on to found the Orange and 3 mobile phone networks.

Wall-mounted signs advertising the Rabbit base stations were still visible in various parts of the UK many years after the Rabbit service ended.

== Home use ==
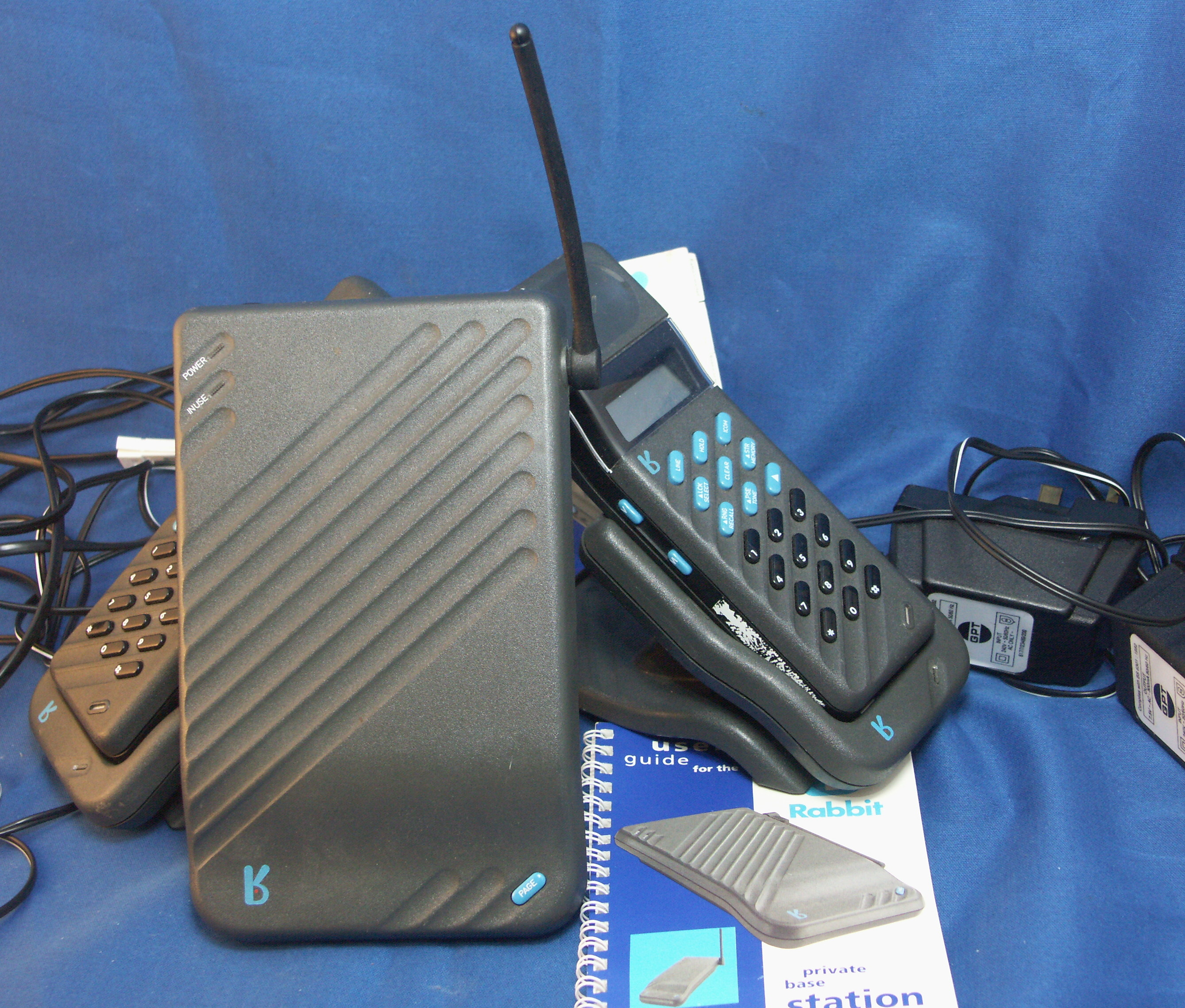
Rabbit CT2 cordless telephone with home base stations, made by GPT

Many of the Rabbit CT2 telephones were sold with a home base station as a home CT2 cordless telephone system and these continued to be used for many years after the closure of the Rabbit network.

== Branding ==
The Rabbit name, logo and advertising campaign idea was devised by Hook Advertising and specifically its chairman Chris Joseph. Competitors emerging onto the new Telepoint market tended to adopt more technological-sounding names — Zonephone, Callpoint and Phonepoint — and Joseph wanted to devise a distinctive brand name to stand out in the market. He selected the name Rabbit as it sounded warmer and more friendly. Joseph had studied Russian and sketched out a logo based an inverted 'Я' character from the Cyrillic alphabet with a dot in the middle, which resembled both the Latin alphabet 'R' and the head of a rabbit. Hook successfully pitched the idea to the Barclays Philips Shell consortium (BYPS) and signed with them in 1989.

=== Legal dispute ===
When BYPS sold the telepoint network business to Hutchison in late 1990, Hook Advertising refused to sign over the copyright of the Rabbit logo. Hutchison had terminated the contracts of other BYPS suppliers and Hook Advertising believed both that they were about to have their own contract terminated too and that signing over the copyright was not part of their contract. Hutchison terminated the contract in September 1991 and sued Hook Advertising in the High Court for an assignment of the copyright. Hook Advertising replied by suing Barclays, Philips, Shell and Hutchinson for various breaches and severances of contract. Barclays in turn sued Hook Advertising. Litigation continued for four years.
