= CT1 =

CT1 (Cordless telephone generation 1) was the first-generation analog cordless telephone standard that was developed by the European Conference of Postal and Telecommunications Administrations (CEPT) in 1984 and used primarily in Europe. The standard defined the technical and operational characteristics for cordless telephones, allowing a wireless handset to communicate with a base station that is connected to the public telephone network. The original frequency allocation included 40 duplex channels using 25 kHz separation, with handsets transmitting in the 914-915 MHz band and base stations transmitting n the 959-960 MHz band. These frequencies overlap with those used by channels 120-124 on GSM cellular phones and thus these original frequencies have been withdrawn from use for cordless phones in the countries that originally authorized them.

CT1+ provided in 1987 for a set of 80 additional channels using the same technical standard with 885–887 MHz used by the phones and 930–932 MHz used by the base stations. The introduction of CT1+ was driven by the increasing demand for cordless telephone channels, as the original 40 channels proved insufficient to support the growing number of users without severe interference problems when multiple handsets operated in the same area. While not part of the original GSM-900 band, the frequencies do overlap with the extended GSM-900 band.

Both CT1 and CT1+ suffered from significant technological limitations that made them unsuitable for serious business communications. With their analog radio links, CT1 telephones provided very poor speech quality, were subject to severe noise and fading, and provided little or no protection against eavesdroppers with even the simplest radio equipment. With their single fixed operating frequencies, they led to severe problems of mutual interference whenever more than a small number of handsets were employed within the same area.

CT1+ was eventually phased out in favor of CT2 because the digital technology offered substantial advantages over the analog CT1/CT1+ systems. Between the advent of digital cordless telephones and the desire to free up spectrum for mobile telephones, these frequencies are being withdrawn for use. Since 31 December 2008, CTA1 and CTA2 based phones are forbidden in Germany.

CT0 is a term used for pre-CT1 analog cordless telephones that were deployed in a variety of countries with incompatible standards, mostly in the low VHF frequency range below broadcast Band I.
