= Arcor (telecommunications) =

Former fixed phone line and Internet business of Vodafone D2 GmbH

Arcor AG & Co. KG
- Company type: Subsidiary
- Industry: Telecommunications
- Predecessor: DBKom
- Founded: 1996
- Defunct: August 1, 2009 (Rebranded as Vodafone)
- Fate: Merged into Vodafone D2 GmbH
- Successor: Vodafone Germany
- Headquarters: Eschborn, Germany
- Area served: Germany
- Products: Fixed-line telephony, ISDN, ADSL, Internet services
- Owner: Vodafone (100% since 2008)
- Parent: Vodafone D2 GmbH
- Website: www.arcor.de (Archived)

Arcor was the former name of the fixed phone line and Internet business of Vodafone D2 GmbH, a German subsidiary of telecommunications company Vodafone. It was the second-largest provider of fixed phone lines in Germany, after Deutsche Telekom. The name was changed on 1 August 2009 following Vodafone's acquisition of the company. Its headquarters were in Eschborn, near Frankfurt. It was one of the few telecommunications companies in Germany to operate an ISDN network independent of the incumbent provider, Deutsche Telekom.

In 2008, Vodafone Germany had 2.1 million ADSL customers and 1.1 million ISDN customers. Arcor was the first German telecommunications provider to offer a flat rate tariff for ISDN phone lines.

== History ==
Mannesmann Arcor AG & Co. KG was formed in 1996 as a joint venture between Mannesmann, Deutsche Bank and DBKom, a subsidiary of Deutsche Bahn, the national railway operator. After Mannesmann was acquired by Vodafone, the company was renamed Arcor AG & Co. KG.

On 19 May 2008, Vodafone acquired the minority shareholdings of Deutsche Bahn and Deutsche Bank (18.17% and 8.18%, respectively) to gain full control of Arcor.

== Censorship controversy ==
In September 2007, various computer magazines reported that Arcor was blocking access to a small number of pornography sites, such as YouPorn, for their domestic Internet users. Technology news website Heise Online reported that a competing Internet pornography business had advised Arcor that the blocked sites were illegal under German law, as they either had no or inadequate measures to verify the age of people accessing their content.

== Sponsorship ==
Arcor sponsored the German football club Hertha BSC from 2002 to 2006.
