= Archbishop Tenison's School =

Location
- 55 Kennington Oval; Lambeth; London, SE11 5SR; England; 51.4826°N 0.1160°W

Information
- Type: Academy
- Motto: Let your light shine before others
- Religious affiliation: Church of England
- Established: 1685; 341 years ago
- Closed: 31 August 2023; 3 years ago
- Local authority: Lambeth
- Trust: Southwark Diocesan Board of Education Multi-Academy Trust
- Department for Education URN: 145857 Tables
- Ofsted: Reports
- Gender: Coeducational
- Age: 11 to 16
- Colours: Navy and Red
- Diocese: Southwark
- Website: http://www.tenisons.com

Archbishop Tenison's Grammar School, also known as Archbishop Tenison's School or Tenison's, was established as a library and grammar school for 30 poor boys in the parish of St Martin-in-the-Fields in 1685. The school moved location several times and adapted its status, provision and partnerships over the years in response to a changing educational landscape: as a library and grammar school, then a grammar school only, then a comprehensive, voluntary aided, grant aided and finally as an academy.

Most recently, 2019–2023, Tenison's was run as an academy and was based in Lambeth directly opposite The Oval cricket ground, home of Surrey County Cricket Club. The school catered for around 530 girls and boys aged 11–16 and was managed by the Southwark Diocese Board of Education Multi Academy Trust.

== History ==
Thomas Tenison, an educational evangelist and later Archbishop of Canterbury, founded several schools in the late 17th and early 18th centuries. The boys' grammar school was founded in 1685 in Castle Street (now the site of the National Portrait Gallery) and relocated in 1871 to Leicester Square (to a site previously occupied by the Sabloniere Hotel). The school moved to The Oval in 1928, with the new building being opened by the then Prince of Wales (later King Edward VIII).

Dr Thomas Tenison set a charity school when he became rector of St Martin-in-the-Fields, and another nearby when he was also minister of St James's, Piccadilly – these later combined onto a new site. The previous school had been a room in the church, but Tenison saw the need for and established a purpose built school and library to provide free education for poor local boys so they could prepare for trades, employment and university. In 1684 Tenison asked Christopher Wren to design a new school building as well as a library in Castle Street near St Martin's Lane. The library eventually closed and the books sold in order to continue to pay the school's running costs, and Archbishop Tenison's Grammar School remained in that location until 1871.

Archbishop Tenison's Library and Grammar School formed the centre section of the large parish workhouse buildings facing Castle Street. The school inhabited a spacious room at street level, where boys could learn to read and write and learn skills to equip them for future vocational training, employment or further academic study. The buildings were eventually demolished to make way for the new National Gallery, and the school moved to new premises in Leicester Square in 1871, merging with the King Street school.

By the end of the 19th century the inspectors noted that classrooms were cramped, and the playground was a small courtyard surrounded by high buildings. The trustees were again struggling to manage the school site. By 1918 education was now compulsory up to the age of 14, which helped the school continue to be full although attainment was generally low. The school was admitting children as young as 7 and teaching mixed ability, mixed age classes was challenging.

In 1922 there were 220 pupils between ages 7–17; 67% did not live in Westminster but travelled in from Lambeth and elsewhere. "The increase of numbers and difficulty of organising so small a school under modern conditions have made another building necessary." Trustees considered various options to try to accommodate the changing needs of the local population and steer the school to find its place in the local education system. Suitable land was identified in Kennington, owned by the Duchy of Cornwall, and terms were agreed. There was a delay of several years before the school moved from the West End to The Oval.

The school was officially opened by the Prince of Wales in July 1928. Most pupils had to pay fees (payable in advance and included all books and stationery, and parents committed to keeping the boy at school until he was 16) although the school continued to offer some free places.

The war years introduced new challenges and direct damage to the building, but by the 1960s the school was once again flourishing and invested in annexes and extensions to accommodate a growing number of boys. In 1969 Harold Macmillan (former prime minister) opened the 'Hinton Wing' extension to the original building, with departments for biology, geography, history and music, a sixth form suite, improved staffrooms, and a metal workshop.

After a period as a local authority comprehensive school, Tenison's became grant-maintained in 1993, and voluntary aided in 1998.

Following an Ofsted inspection which judged the school 'inadequate', In 2019 the school converted to academy status and was operated by the Southwark Diocese Multi Academy Trust until the school closed in Summer 2023.

== Other schools founded by Thomas Tenison ==
St Martin in the Fields Girls School was a close historical neighbour for many years, at the Leicester Square site, before also moving to Lambeth in the 1920s. There was also another girls' school formally established in 1706 for 12 girls. In 1863 a new school building was erected at 18 Lambeth High Street. The girls school closed in 1961, when it amalgamated with Archbishop Temple's Boys School to form a mixed voluntary aided (VA) school. The building was used by Temple's as a first-year annex from 1968 to 1974, when Archbishop Temple's School closed. After he became Archbishop, Tenison founded another school in nearby Croydon (in between the Archbishop's palaces of Canterbury and Lambeth) in 1714.

== School badge ==
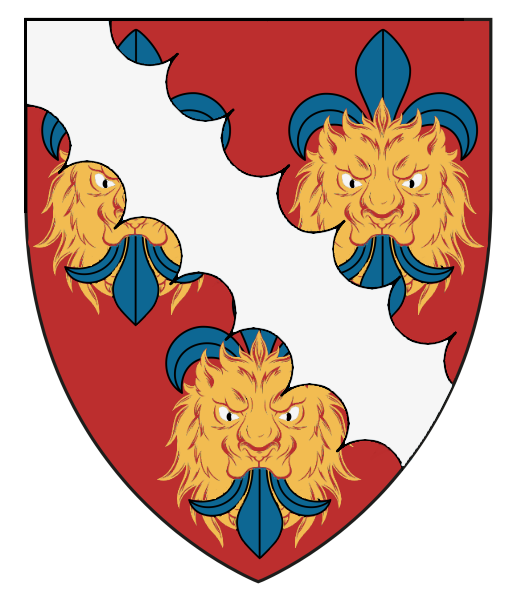
The armorial bearings of the Tenison family: Gules three leopard's faces Or jessant-de-lys azure over all a bend engrailled argent

The badges of both the schools founded by Thomas Tenison are based on his personal coat of arms, which consist of the arms of the see of Canterbury impaling the Tenison family arms. The former, placed on the dexter side of honour, are blazoned as: Azure, an archiepiscopal cross in pale or surmounted by a pall proper charged with four crosses patee fitchee sable. The arms of Tenison, placed on the sinister side of the escutcheon are blazoned as: Gules, a bend engrailed argent voided azure between three leopard's faces or jessant-de-lys azure. In standard English: a red field bearing a white (or silver) diagonal band with scalloped edges, and a narrower blue band running down its centre. This lies between three gold heraldic lion's faces, each of which is pierced by a fleur-de-lys entering through the mouth.

== Notable Old Tenisonians (OTs) ==
- Jeremiah Emmanuel, youth influencer
- Jason Euell, footballer
- Patrick Harrington, political activist
- Stephen Moore, actor
- Tony Banks, Baron Stratford, Labour MP from 1997 to 2005 for West Ham and from 1983 to 1997 for Newham North West
- Nicky Clarke, celebrity hair stylist
- Chris Gent, former Chief Executive Officer from 1997 to 2003 of Vodafone, and Chairman since 2005 of GlaxoSmithKline
- Don Letts, musician, member of Big Audio Dynamite
- Chris Riddell, award-winning illustrator, author, political cartoonist
