= Mannesmann =

Defunct German conglomerate

Mannesmann AG
- Industry: conglomerate
- Predecessor: Essener Steinkohlenbergwerke; Hartmann & Braun; Kammerich Werke AG; Salzgitter Mannesmann; Wolf Netter & Jacobi; ZF Sachs
- Founded: 16 July 1890; 136 years ago
- Founder: Reinhard and Max Mannesmann
- Defunct: August 22, 2001
- Fate: Taken over by Vodafone
- Successor: Vodafone
- Headquarters: Düsseldorf, Germany
- Area served: Germany
- Products: Steel; Engineering (mechanical & electrical); Automotive; Telecommunications
- Owner: Vodafone
- Parent: Vodafone PLC
- Website: www.mannesmann.com

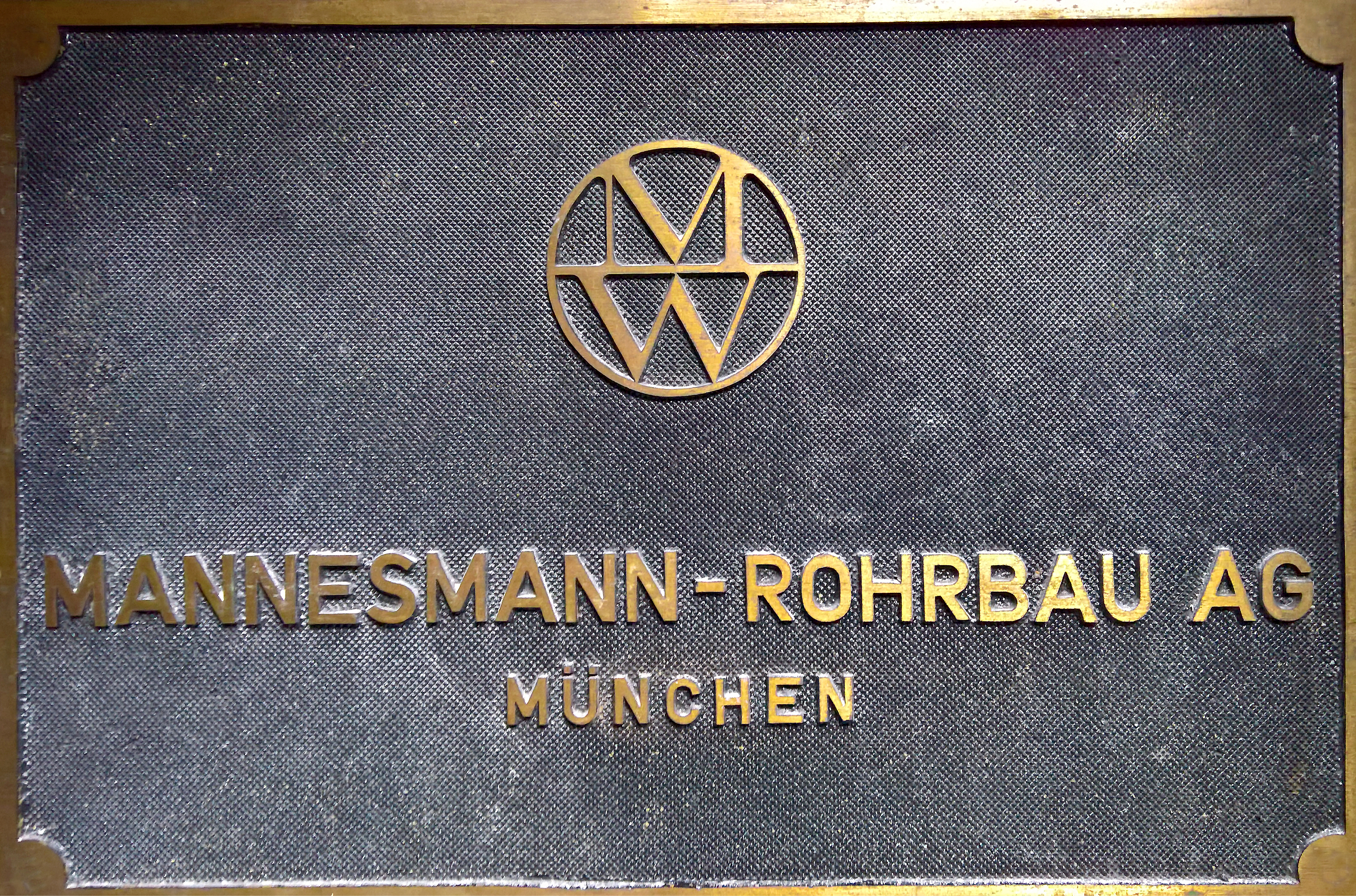
Brass sign from Mannesmann-Rohrbau AG – Munich

Mannesmann (German pronunciation: [ˈmanəsman]) was a German industrial conglomerate. It was originally established as a manufacturer of steel pipes in 1890 under the name "Deutsch-Österreichische Mannesmannröhren-Werke AG" (lit. "German-Austrian Mannesmann pipe-works joint-stock company"). In the twentieth century, Mannesmann's product range grew and the company expanded into numerous sectors; starting from various steel products and trading to mechanical and electrical engineering, automotive and telecommunications. From 1955, the conglomerate's management holding with headquarters in Düsseldorf was named Mannesmann AG.

The particular success of the corporate activities in the area of telecommunications that started in 1990 was the predominant reason for the takeover of Mannesmann by the British telecommunications company Vodafone in 2000, still one of the largest-ever company takeovers worldwide. Back then, the Mannesmann Group had 130,860 employees worldwide and revenues of €23.27 billion.

The corporate name Mannesmann ceased to exist across the engineering, automotive, and telecommunications sectors soon after its acquisition by Vodafone. This event marked the end of the brand's direct presence in those industries. However, the name survives within the German steel industry, specifically maintaining its identity in the specialised steel tube and pipe manufacturing sector, which represents its original industrial core. This existence was secured when the major German steel manufacturer Salzgitter AG purchased the pipe production division of Mannesmannröhren-Werke AG (now operating as Mannesmannröhren-Werke GmbH), thereby acquiring ownership of the Mannesmann brand itself, ensuring its future within global heavy industry.

== History ==
=== Establishment and growth as an international tube manufacturer ===
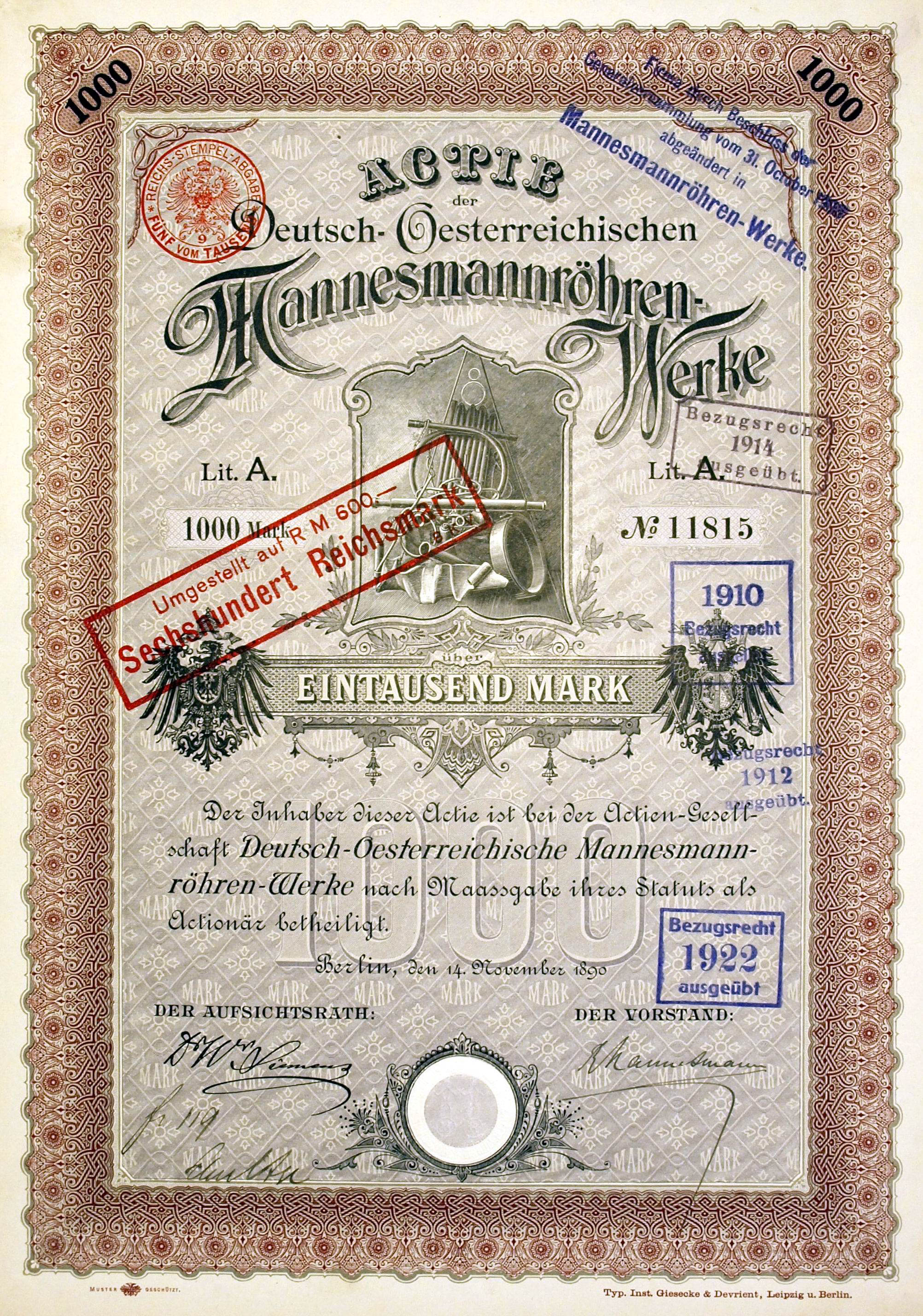
Share of the Deutsch-Oesterreichischen Mannesmannröhren-Werke AG, issued 14 November 1890

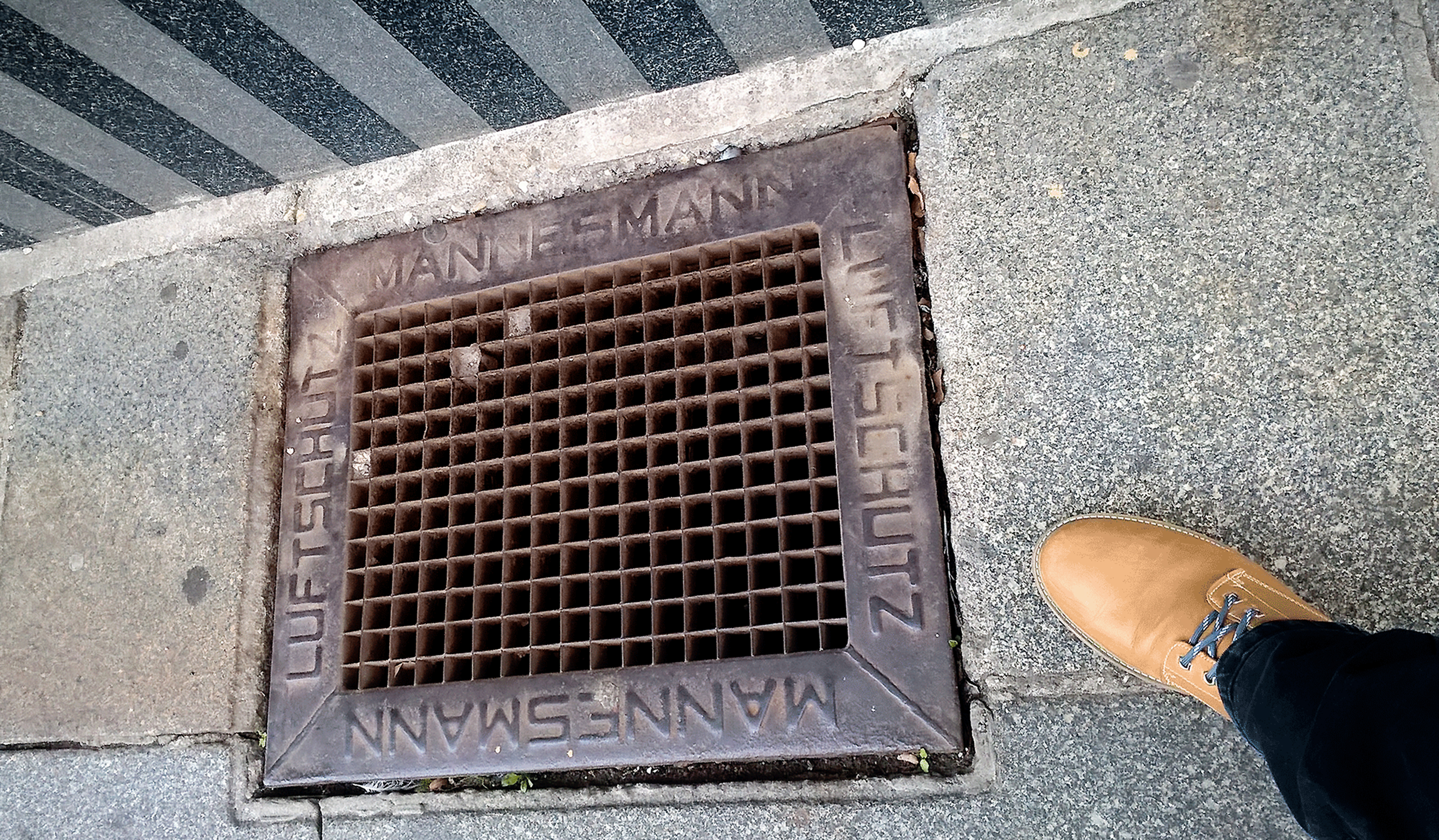
A c. 1940 Mannesmann air protection grille at City Hall in Dresden

In 1886, the German brothers Reinhard (1856–1922) and Max Mannesmann (1857–1915) received the world's first patent for their invention of a process for rolling seamless steel pipes (Mannesmann process). Between 1887 and 1889 they founded tube mills with several different business partners in Bous, Germany, in Komotau/Bohemia, in Landore/Wales and in their home town Remscheid/Germany. In 1890, due to technical and financial start-up problems, the tube and pipe mills existing on the continent were folded into Deutsch-Österreichische Mannesmannröhren-Werke AG. The new company had its headquarters in Berlin. Reinhard and Max Mannesmann formed the first board of directors but left it in 1893. In that year the company headquarters were moved to Düsseldorf—at that time the center of the German tube and pipe industry. The company was renamed Mannesmannröhren-Werke AG in 1908.

In the following years the company's position in the export business, which was important from the beginning, was consolidated and expanded by the acquisition of the Mannesmann tube mill in Landore, Wales, and by the founding of a Mannesmann tube mill in Dalmine, Italy. Branch offices for storage and direct sales business, sometimes with tube processing workshops and pipeline construction capacities, were set up in cooperation with well-established companies all over the world, especially in South America, Asia, and South Africa. In addition, Mannesmannröhren-Werke took up the production of welded steel pipes, stainless steel pipes and other type of pipes and tubes. The company became the worldwide leading manufacturer of steel tube and pipe

=== Expansion into a coal and steel conglomerate ===
In the first decades of its existence, Mannesmann was a pure manufacturer and therefore highly dependent on third-party deliveries of starting material. To reduce the associated risk, the company started to broaden into a vertically integrated iron and steel group in the first half of the twentieth century. The group had its own ore and coal production, steel manufacturers and processors as well as an integrated trading division. In the 1950s Mannesmann established pipe mills in Brazil, Canada and Turkey

=== Further diversification ===
In 1955, the group's management holding was renamed Mannesmann AG. The group continued to develop into a highly diversified conglomerate. The corporate sectors engineering and automotive founded in the late 1960s comprised famous companies as e.g. Rexroth, Demag, Dematic, Fichtel & Sachs, VDO, Mannesman Sachs, Boge, Kienzle, Krauss-Maffei, Hartmann & Braun and Tally. Within the Mannesmann Group several of these companies evolved into world market leaders in their respective business sectors.

=== Telecommunications ===
In 1990, following the liberalization of the German telecommunications market, Mannesmann set up a new business sector and established Germany's first cellular network carrier in private ownership known as D2 Mannesmann. The network company was called Mannesmann Mobilfunk GmbH. It was the main competitor to Germany's incumbent carrier, Deutsche Telekom's T-Mobile, also known as D1. Additionally, Mannesmann extended its telecommunications division with integrated services covering mobile and fixed network telephony, Internet, and TeleCommerce with companies in Germany, Italy, UK and Austria

=== Takeover by Vodafone and aftermath ===
The Europe-wide telecommunication branch of Mannesmann was extraordinarily successful and so in 1999 the Mannesmann Group hatched a plan to spin off the other divisions. Through a stock exchange flotation under the name of Mannesmann Atecs AG, these industrial divisions were to be combined in a separate enterprise that would be one of the largest companies listed in the German stock index DAX. However, before these plans could materialize, a historic takeover battle lasting several months ended with the acquisition of Mannesmann by the British mobile phone company Vodafone in 2000. On 4 February 2000 Mannesmann's supervisory board eventually agreed to a takeover price of €190 billion, which was the largest takeover price ever paid until SpaceX acquired xAI for US$250B in February 2026. The telecommunications division of Mannesmann was subsequently incorporated into the Vodafone Group.

The other divisions were resold to various companies soon after the deal. The origins of Mannesmann, the pipe production activities of Mannesmannröhren-Werke AG, were sold to Salzgitter AG along with the brand name Mannesmann. Siemens AG bought the majority of Atecs Mannesmann AG, including automobile components (VDO Adolf Schindling AG, Mannesmann Sachs, Boge GmbH), cranes and locomotives (Mannesman Demag Krauss-Maffei GmbH), logistics (Mannesmann Dematic AG), and defense (Krauss-Maffei Wegmann); Robert Bosch GmbH acquired Rexroth, an industrial engineering company. KraussMaffei logos and trademarks are transferred to Krauss-Maffei Kunststofftechnik GmbH, plastics and molding equipment subsidiary that was spun off in 1986.

== Controversies ==
During the Second World War, when the company was chaired by Nazi Party activist Wilhelm Zangen, slave labour was employed at their tube rolling mills. Zangen served four months in prison for his involvement, although he remained a leading figure with Mannesmann until his retirement in 1966.

In 2000, Mannesmann was acquired by Vodafone Group Plc. in a tax-free exchange of 53.7 Vodafone shares for each share of Mannesmann. This was a controversial takeover, since never before in Germany had a company as large and successful as Mannesmann been acquired in a hostile takeover by a non-German owner. The merger was said to have been engineered in a private deal concluded between Mannesmann's management and Vodafone. The acquisition was spearheaded by Vodafone's chief executive, Chris Gent, and Goldman Sachs' Scott Mead, who was then the chief advisor on the deal. The circumstances of the deal and the (not only for German standards) particularly high severance payments awarded to leading managers of the company led in 2004 to a trial at Landgericht Düsseldorf (Düsseldorf Regional Court)—the so-called Mannesmann trial. The accused, among others the chairman of the supervisory board at the time of the takeover, Josef Ackermann, and the former CEO of Mannesmann, Klaus Esser, were initially granted a full discharge by the court. However, after revision proceedings, the Bundesgerichtshof Federal Court of Justice overruled the contested judgment and referred the case back for retrial at the Landgericht. On 29 November 2006, the proceedings were terminated, with the defendants agreeing to settlements amounting to millions of euros.

Under the terms of the takeover deal, Mannesmann sought assurances from Vodafone that the Mannesmann brand and name would be kept under the new owners. This was agreed and the deal was announced. However, not long after this, Vodafone reneged on the deal and rebranded.

== Individual subsidiaries ==
=== Mannesmann Arcor ===
Mannesmann Arcor was a fixed line telephony and internet company. It has been owned solely by Vodafone since May 2008, when Deutsche Bahn (18.17%) and Deutsche Bank (8.18%) sold their shares to Vodafone.
