= Supméca =

French engineering school

Supmeca Paris
- Supméca
- Other names: Institut supérieur de mécanique de Paris
- Former names: CESTI
- Established: 1948
- Budget: 21 M€
- Director: Philippe Girard
- Students: 600
- Location: Saint-Ouen-sur-Seine, France; 48.9198°N 2.3327°E
- Website: https://en.supmeca.fr/
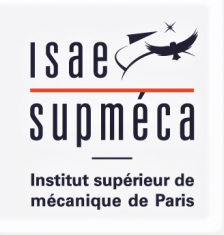

Supméca (Institut Supérieur de Mécanique) is a French mechanical engineering school. The school is an active member of the Polyméca network and part of the ENSI (Ecole Nationale Superieure d'Ingenieur) school group as well as the ISAE Group. According to the 2016 rankings of French Magazine L'Usine nouvelle, Supméca is ranked among the 10 best engineering schools in the fields of mechanics, aeronautics, automobile, transport and materials.

== Notable alumni ==
Since its founding in 1948, Supméca has produced more than 6,800 graduates.

- Jean-François Pontal - ex-CEO of Orange Worldwide.
- Bernard Dudot - French engineer who was instrumental in the development of the turbo V6 and normally aspirated V10 engines of Formula One while working for Alpine and Renault.
- Bernard Charlès - CEO and Vice-Chairman of the board of directors of Dassault Systèmes.
