= List of National Geographic cover stories (1959 and 1960s) =

National Geographic logo

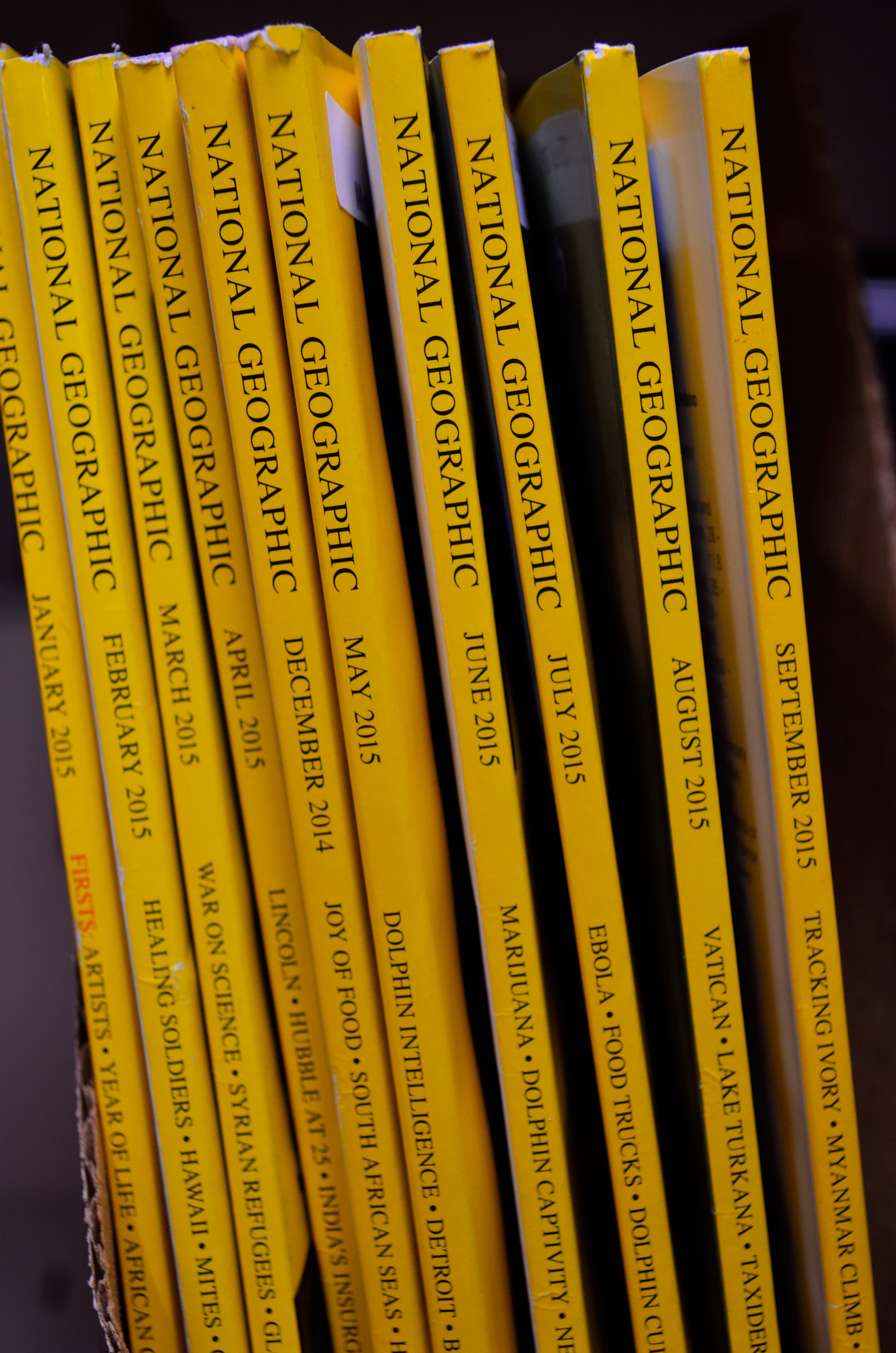
National Geographic magazines.

National Geographic is an American magazine that is noted for its cover stories and accompanying photography. The first photo to appear on the cover of National Geographic was in the July 1959 issue of the magazine. The cover story titled "New Stars for Old Glory" featured the 49-star flag of the United States after Alaska's admission to the Union as a U.S. state, which was signed into law on July 3, 1959, by President Dwight D. Eisenhower. The article was written by Lonnelle Aikman, with the photograph captured by B. Anthony Stewart.

Throughout the 1960s National Geographic's cover stories showcased global historical events such as the one hundredth Anniversary of the Unification of Italy and America's involvement in the Vietnam War. Cover stories included articles written by notable writers such as Jacques Cousteau, Dwight D. Eisenhower, Jane Goodall and Melville Bell Grosvenor. Cover photos were published by notable photographers such as Winfield Parks, Helen and Frank Schreider and twin brothers Frank and John Craighead.

The 1960s saw articles written and photographed at locations around the globe featuring wildlife like the March 1967 issue titled "Snowflake, the World's First White Gorilla", written by Arthur J. Riopelle with a photo on the cover of Snowflake the gorilla, photographed by Paul A. Zahl. Articles featured on the cover of the magazine also included human-interest stories such as "Afghanistan: Crossroads of Conquerors", written and photographed by Thomas J. Abercrombie featuring an Afghan family in the September 1968 issue. Many geographical locations were featured including Mount Everest in the October 1963 article "Six to the Summit" about the American Everest expedition, written by Norman Dyhrenfurth with photographs by mountaineer Barry C. Bishop.

In the December 1969 issue, astronauts Neil Armstrong, Buzz Aldrin and Michael Collins wrote the cover story titled "First Explorers on the Moon", writing in detail their account of the Apollo 11 mission and what it was like being the first humans on the Moon. The photo on the cover of the magazine featured a picture taken from space by Armstrong, that of Aldrin in a spacesuit on the surface of the Moon.

== 1959 ==
Only five issues were published in 1959 with photos on the cover.

1959
Title^{a}	Date	Author	Photographer/artist	Images^{b}	Ref
New Stars for Old Glory	July 1959	Lonnelle Aikman	B. Anthony Stewart	Flag of the United States	
Pacific Fleet: Force for Peace	September 1959	W.E. Garrett	Franc Shor	A jet's afterburner	
Creatures of Hawaii's Coral Reefs	October 1959	Paul A. Zahl	Paul A. Zahl	Girl gathering Sea urchins	
California's Wonderful One	November 1959	Frank Cameron	B. Anthony Stewart	Golden Gate Bridge	
New Guinea to Bali in Yankee	December 1959	Irving and Electa Johnson	W. L. Newton	Brigantine Yankee	

== 1960 ==
1960
Title^{a}	Date	Author	Photographer/artist	Images^{b}	Ref
Little Laos, Next Door to Red China	January 1960	Elizabeth Perazic	Hannah Herz	Laos rice-farmer with water buffalo	
Chile, The Long and Narrow Land	February 1960	Kip Ross	Staff photographer^{c}	Chilean man	
Fountain of Fire in Hawaii	March 1960	Frederick Simpich Jr.	Robert B. Goodman	Volcano in Hawaii	
Diving Saucer Takes to the Deep	April 1960	Jacques Cousteau	Photographer	Diving Saucer	
When the President Goes Abroad	May 1960	Gilbert M. Grosvenor	Gilbert M. Grosvenor	Dwight D. Eisenhower	
Eternal France	June 1960	Walter Meayers Edwards	Walter Meayers Edwards	Arc de Triomphe	
Space Pioneers of NASA	July 1960	Allan C. Fisher Jr.	Dean Conger	Space capsule	
Knocking Out Grizzly Bears For Their Own Good	August 1960	Frank and John Craighead	Frank and John Craighead	Grizzly bears	
Where Elephants Have the Right of Way	September 1960	George and Jinx Rodger	George and Jinx Rodger^{d}	Women of Uganda (picture shaped of Africa)	
From the Hair of Silva	October 1960	Helen and Frank Schreider	Helen and Frank Schreider	person pryaing at Taj Mahal	
The Hummingbirds	November 1960	Crawford Greenewalt	Crawford Greenewalt	Hummingbird	
Japan: The Exquisite Enigma	December 1960	Franc Shor	John Landois	Japanese Maiko	

== 1961 ==
1961
Title^{a}	Date	Author	Photographer/artist	Images^{b}	Ref
Inside the White House	January 1961	Lonnelle Aikman	B. Anthony Stewart	White House	
Exploring New Britain's Land of Fire	February 1961	E. Thomas Gilliard	E. Thomas Gilliard	New Guinea native	
The Magic Road Round Ireland	March 1961	H. V. Morton	Robert F. Sisson	Irish woman	
Witness to a War	April 1961	Robert T. Cochran	Illustrated London News	Battery Wagner	
Indonesia: The Young and Troubled Island Nation	May 1961	Helen and Frank Schreider	Helen and Frank Schreider^{d}	Balinese woman	
The city: London's Storied Square Mile	June 1961	Allen C. Fisher	Melville Bell Grosvenor	Grenadier Guards in London, England	
From Sea to Shining Sea: A Cross Section of the United States Along Historic Route 40	July 1961	Ralph Gray	Ralph Gray; Dean Conger	Photomontage of the United States	
Report on Laos	August 1961	Peter T. White	W.E. Garrett	Laos children eating noodles	
United Nations: Capital of the Family Man	September 1961	Adlai E. Stevenson	B. Anthony Stewart^{d}; John E. Fletcher^{d}	Headquarters of the United Nations	
Mexico in Motion	October 1961	Bart McDowell	Kip Ross	Mexican woman	
United Italy Marks its 100th Year	November 1961	Nathaniel T. Kenney	William Palmstrom	Map of Italy	
The Kress Collection: A Gift to the Nation	December 1961	Guy Emmerson, Litt. D.	Samuel Henry Kress collection	Madonna art	

== 1962 ==
1962
Title^{a}	Date	Author	Photographer/artist	Images^{b}	Ref
Florida's Coral City Beneath the Sea	January 1962	Jerry Greenberg	Jerry Greenberg	diver at Coral Reef State Park	
Roseate spoonbill – Radiant birds of the gulf coast	February 1962	Robert Porter Allen	Frederick Kent Truslow	Roseate spoonbill	
Journey to Outer Mongolia	March 1962	William O. Douglas	Dean Conger	Mongolians	
Huzza for Ataheite!	April 1962	Luis Marden	Luis Marden	Bounty (1960 ship)	
Australian New Guinea	May 1962	John Scofield	John Scofield	New Guinea tribesman	
John Glenn's three orbits in Friendship 7	June 1962	Robert B. Voas	Robert C. Maple	John Glenn	
Tahiti, "Finest Island in the World"	July 1962	Luis Marden	Luis Marden	Tahitian woman	
Cape Cod – Where Sea holds Sway Over Man and Land	August 1962	Nathaniel T. Kenney	Dean Conger	Cape Cod map	
Brazil, Oba!	September 1962	Peter T. White	Winfield Parks	Copacabana Beach, Brazil	
California's City of Angels	October 1962	Robert D. Roos	Thomas Nebbia	Hollywood Boulevard	
Helicopter Over South Viet nam	November 1962	Dickey Chapelle	Dickey Chapelle	South Vietnam village on fire	
Puerto Rico's Seven-League Bootstraps	December 1962	Bart McDowell	B. Anthony Stewart	Cruise ship Empress	

== 1963 ==
1963
Title^{a}	Date	Author	Photographer/artist	Images^{b}	Ref
Expeditions of the National Geographic Society 1888–1963	January 1963	Melvin M. Payne	Tom Lovell	Explorer I	
Burma – Gentle Neighbor of India and Red China	February 1963	W. Robert Moore	W. Robert Moore	A Burmese woman dancing	
Arizona: Booming Youngster of the West	March 1963	Robert De Roos	Robert F. Sisson	Navajo Herder in Arizona	
Ships Through the Ages: A Saga of the Seas	April 1963	Alan Villiers	Willem van de Velde	HMS Resolution	
India: Subcontinent in Crisis	May 1963	John Scofield	John Scofield	Rajasthan woman	
Italian Riviera, Land that Winter Forgot	June 1963	Howell Walker	Howell Walker	Portofino, Italy	
Athens: Golden Past and Busy Present	July 1963	Kenneth F. Weaver	Phillip Harrington	Parthenon	
The Magic Worlds of Walt Disney	August 1963	Robert De Roos	Thomas Nebbia	Girls at Disneyland	
Australia: Vigorous Young Nation in the South Seas	September 1963	Alan Villiers	Robert B. Goodman	Australian boat and swimmers	
Six to the Summit	October 1963	Norman Dyhrenfurth	Barry C. Bishop	Mount Everest	
The Parks in Your Backyard	November 1963	Conrad L. Wirth	Albert Moldvay	Deer at a national park	
Triumph of the First Crusade to the Holy land: The Capture of Jerusalem	December 1963	Franc Shor	Thomas Nebbia	Nicaea under siege	

== 1964 ==
1964
Title^{a}	Date	Author	Photographer/artist	Images^{b}	Ref
The Nation's Capital Revealed as Never Before	January 1964	Senator Carl Hayden	George F. Mobley	U.S. Capitol	
The Five Worlds of Peru	February 1964	Kenneth F. Weaver	Bates Littlehales	Native Peruvian baby	
How We Plan to Put Men on the Moon	March 1964	Hugh Latimer Dryden	David Weltzer	Gemini spacecraft	
At Home in the Sea	April 1964	Capt. Jacques-Yves Cousteau	Robert B. Goodman	Undersea village Red Sea	
President Johnson Dedicates the Society's New Headquarters	May 1964	Staff writer^{e}	Bates Littlehales	Lyndon B. Johnson at National Geographic Headquarters	
Exploring America Underground	June 1964	Charles H. Mohr	David S. Boyer^{d}; Adrian R. Wiker^{d}	Carlsbad Caverns	
World's Tallest Tree Discovered	July 1964	Melville Bell Grosvenor	George F. Mobley	Redwood	
Para-Explorers Challenge Peru's Unknown Vilcabamba	August 1964	G. Brooks Baekeland	Peter Gimbel	Parachuteer	
Ambassadors of Good Will, the Peace Corps: Ecuador	September 1964	Rhoda and Earle Brooks	David S. Boyer	Peace Corps in Ecuador	
Cambodia, Indochina's "Neutral" Corner	October 1964	Thomas J. Abercrombie	Thomas J. Abercrombie	Cambodian dancer with mask in front of Angkor Wat	
This is the China I Saw	November 1964	Jorgen Bisch (Jørgen Bitsch)	Jorgen Bisch	woman at Peking opera	
Jerusalem, My Home	December 1964	Bertha Spafford Vester	Photographer	Doves in Jerusalem	

== 1965 ==
1965
Title^{a}	Date	Author	Photographer/artist	Images^{b}	Ref
Americans in Action in Vietnam	January 1965	Howard Sochurek	Howard Sochurek	soldiers walking in Vietnam War	
Four-Ocean Navy in the Nuclear Age	February 1965	Thomas W. Mcknew	Winfield Parks	USS Enterprise	
The Changing Face of Old Spain	March 1965	Bart McDowell	Albert Moldvay	Flamenco dancer	
Ethiopian Adventure	April 1965	Nathaniel T. Kenny	James P. Blair	Holyman of Ethiopia holding cross	
Yankee Cruises the Stored Nile	May 1965	Irving and Electa Johnson	Winfield Parks	sailboat going by Abu Simbel	
Moths that Behave Like Hummingbirds	June 1965	Treat Davidson	Treat Davidson	Sphinx moth	
Down the Danube by Canoe	July 1965	William Slade Backer	R. S. Durrance^{d}; C. G. Knight^{d}	kayakers in front of Budapest building	
The Churchill I Knew	August 1965	Dwight D. Eisenhower	George W. Harris	Winston Churchill giving victory symobol	
United States Air Force: Power for Peace	September 1965	Curtis LeMay	Albert Moldvay	F-105 Thunderchief	
Mustang, Nepal's Lost Kingdom	October 1965	Michel Peissel	Michel Peissel	People of Nepal	
I Joined a Sahara Salt Caravan	November 1965	Victor Englebert	Victor Englebert	Veiled Tuareg noble	
New Discoveries Among Africa's Chimpanzees	December 1965	Jane Goodall	Hugo van Lawick	Jane Goodall with chimpanzees	

== 1966 ==
1966
Title^{a}	Date	Author	Photographer/artist	Images^{b}	Ref
Saudi Arabia	January 1966	Thomas J. Abercrombie	Thomas J. Abercrombie	Bedouin on a camel	
Flamboyant is the World for Bolivia	February 1966	Loren McIntyre	Loren McIntyre	Bolivian woman collecting food	
An American in Moscow	March 1966	Thomas S. Hammond	Dean Conger	Saint Basil's Cathedral	
Working for Weeks on the Sea Floor	April 1966	Jacques Cousteau	Philippe Cousteau	Scuba divers in the Medieirtian Sea	
California, The Golden Magnet: Natures North	May 1966	William Graves	Jonathan Blair	Sailboats; Golden Gate Bridge	
One Man's London	June 1966	Allan C. Fisher Jr.	James P. Blair	Life Guards (UK)	
Today and Tomorrow in Our National Parks	July 1966	Melville Bell Grosvenor	Emory Kristof	Woman at Cape Hatteras	
900 Years Ago: The Norman Conquest	August 1966	Kenneth M. Setton	George F. Mobley	Norman warrior	
The Philippines	September 1966	Robert D. Roos	Ted Spiegel	Bandurria player in Philippines	
To Gilbert Grosvenor: A Monthly Monument 25 Miles High	October 1966	Frederick G. Vosburgh	Staff photographer^{c}	Gilbert Grosvenor with binoculars	
Marvels of a Coral Realm	November 1966	Walter A. Starck II	Walter A. Starck II	Queen angelfish	
Abraham, the Friend of God	December 1966	Kenneth McLeish	Dean Conger	Arab tending sheep	

== 1967 ==
1967
Title^{a}	Date	Author	Photographer/artist	Images^{b}	Ref
Pakistan: Problems of a two-part land	January 1967	Bern Keating	Albert Moldvay	Pakistani women on a swing	
Behind the Headlines in Viet Nam	February 1967	Peter T. White	Winfield Parks	Vietnamese woman	
Snowflake, the World's First White Gorilla	March 1967	Arthur J. Riopelle	Paul A. Zahl	Snowflake (gorilla)	
The Rhine: Europe's River of Legend	April 1967	William Graves	Bruce Dale	The Rhine	
Micronesia-The Americanization of Eden	May 1967	David S. Boyer	Staff photographer^{c}	Micronesian maiden	
Illinois: The City and the Plain	June 1967	Robert Paull Jordan	Bruce Dale	Fisheye lens Apartment buildings in Chicago	
Lake Powell, Waterway to Desert Wonders	July 1967	Walter Meayers Edwards	Walter Meayers Edwards	Lake Powell	
Ancient Aphrodisias and it's Marble Treasures	August 1967	Kenan T. Erim	Jonathan S. Blair	Apollo Marble Head	
Kayak Odyssey: From the Inland Sea to Tokyo	September 1967	Dan Dimancescu	Christopher G. knight	Deer on Island in Japan	
Re-creating Madagascar's Giant Extinct Bird	October 1967	Alexander Wetmore	Staff photographer^{c}	Madagascar statue	
Dry-land Fleet Sails the Sahara	November 1967	Jean Du Boucher	Jonathan S. Blair	Land yachts in Sahara Desert	
Where Jesus Walked	December 1967	Howard LaFay	Charles Harbutt	Christian followers	

== 1968 ==
1968
Title^{a}	Date	Author	Photographer/artist	Images^{b}	Ref
In the Footsteps of Alexander the Great	January 1968	Helen and Frank Schreider	Helen and Frank Schreider	Equestrianism in Afghanstian	
Sharks: Wolves of the Sea	February 1968	Nathaniel T. Kenney	Jerry Greenberg	Whitetip shark	
The Highlands of Scotland	March 1968	Author	Winfield Parks	Highland girl	
Viet Nam's Montagnard	April 1968	Howard Sochurek	Howard Sochurek	Montagnard biting fish	
New National Park Proposed: The Spectacular North Cascades	May 1968	Nathaniel T. Kenney	James P. Blair	North Cascades	
Trek by Mule Among Morocco's Berbers	June 1968	Victor Englebert	Victor Englebert	Children leapfrogging in Morccao	
Lombardy's Lakes, Blue Jewels in Italy's Crown	July 1968	Franc Shor	Joseph J. Scherschel	Lake Como	
South to Mexico City	August 1968	W. E. Garrett	W. E. Garrett	Day of the Dead	
Afghanistan: Crossroads of Conquerors	September 1968	Thomas J. Abercrombie	Thomas J. Abercrombie	Afghan mother and baby	
A Teenager Sails the World Alone	October 1968	Robin Lee Graham	Robin Lee Graham	Robin Lee Graham	
Queensland: Young Titan of Australia's Tropic North	November 1968	Kenneth MacLeish	Winfield Parks	Australian family on a ranch	
The Melong: River of Terror and Hope	December 1968	Peter T. White	W. E. Garrett	Vietnamese children praying	

== 1969 ==
1969
Title^{a}	Date	Author	Photographer/artist	Images^{b}	Ref
Taiwan: The Watchful Dragon	January 1969	Helen and Frank Schreider	Helen and Frank Schreider^{d}	Taiwanese rice farmer with water buffalo	
Kenya Says: Harambee!	February 1969	Allan C. Fisher Jr.	Bruce Dale	Kenya Elephant	
The Magic Lure of Shellfish	March 1969	Paul A. Zahl	Robert F. Sisson	Scallops	
World-roaming Teen-ager Sails On	April 1969	Robin Lee Graham	Robin Lee Graham	Robin Lee Graham showering	
Abu Simbel's Ancient Temples Reborn	May 1969	Georg Gerster	Georg Gerster	Abu Simbel statue with crane	
Deerfield Keeps a Truce With Time	June 1969	Bart McDowell	Robert W. Madden	American boy clapping	
Feeding Time for a Cormorant in a San Diego Aquarium	July 1969	Allan C. Fisher Jr.	James L. Amos	Diver at SeaWorld feeding a cormorant	
Colorado: The Rockies' Pot of Gold	August 1969	Edward J. Linehan	James L. Amos	Maroon Bells in Colorado	
The Friendly Irish	September 1969	John Scofield	James A. Sugar	Irish girl teenager	
Adventures With South Africa's Black Eagles	October 1969	Jeanne Cowden	Arthur Bowland	Jeanne Bowland ducking from Black eagle diving	
Bali By the Back Roads	November 1969	Donna K. Grosvenor; Gilbert M. Grosvenor	Gilbert M. Grosvenor	Indonesian worshipers	
First Explorers on the Moon	December 1969	Neil A. Armstrong; Edwin E. Aldrin; Michael Collins	Neil A. Armstrong	Buzz Aldrin on the Moon	

== See also ==
- National Geographic
- National Geographic Society
- List of National Geographic cover stories

== Notes ==
a. In some issues of National Geographic, the cover story would have one title on the cover and a different title (with the same meaning) on the headline of the actual article. Titles represented in this list, are taken from the cover and the citation represents the article title found in the table of contents.
b. Images could also be a painting or a drawing. Photo credits are found on the inside front cover at the bottom of the page.
c. Uncredited photograph
d. Two photographers credited, it is not stated which one took the photo
e. Uncredited article. Usually a breakout article.
f. Photograph not credited in the magazine, but is at the preceding reference
