= Grosvenor (surname) =

Grosvenor (/ˈɡroʊvənər/ GROH-vən-ər) is a surname derived from Gilbert le Grosveneur, ancestor of the modern Dukes of Westminster, whose family name is "Grosvenor". According to the Grosvenor family, Gilbert was a relative of William the Conqueror and of Hugh d'Avranches, Earl of Chester, and settled in Cheshire after the Norman Conquest. His surname, le gros veneur, might translate as 'the great huntsman' or 'the fat huntsman' in Norman French.

== People ==
- The Grosvenor family, headed by the Duke of Westminster
- Bendor Grosvenor (born 1977), British art dealer and art historian
- Benjamin Grosvenor (born 1992), British classical pianist
- Catherine Grosvenor (born 1978), British playwright and translator
- Charles Henry Grosvenor (1833–1917), Representative from Ohio
- Ebenezer O. Grosvenor (1820–1910), American politician from Michigan
- Edwin S. Grosvenor (born 1951), publisher of American Heritage, son of Melville Bell Grosvenor and half-brother of Gilbert Melville Grosvenor
- Lady Edwina Louise Grosvenor (born 1981), British prison reformer
- Gilbert Hovey Grosvenor (1875–1966), first editor of National Geographic Magazine and president of the National Geographic Society
- Gilbert Melville Grosvenor (born 1931), editor of National Geographic Magazine, son of Melville Bell Grosvenor
- Hugh Grosvenor (born 1991), 7th Duke of Westminster
- Olivia Grosvenor (born 1992), wife of the 7th Duke of Westminster
- Luther Grosvenor (born 1946), British rock musician
- Melville Bell Grosvenor (1901–1982), editor of National Geographic Magazine and president of the National Geographic Society, son of Gilbert Hovey Grosvenor
- Robert Grosvenor, multiple people
- Thomas Peabody Grosvenor (1744–1825), United States Representative from New York
- Vertamae Grosvenor (1938–2016), food writer and broadcaster

== Fictional ==
- Archibald Grosvenor, one of the main characters in the Gilbert & Sullivan opera Patience
