= Gilbert Grosvenor =

Gilbert Grosvenor may refer to:

- Gilbert Hovey Grosvenor (1875–1966), first editor of National Geographic Magazine
- Gilbert M. Grosvenor (born 1931), president of National Geographic Society
