= B. Anthony Stewart =

American photographer for National Geographic

- Born: Benjamín Anthony Stewart; August 20, 1904; Lynch Station, Virginia
- Died: June 5, 1977 (aged 72); Lynchburg, Virginia
- Occupation: Photographer
- Years active: 42 years
- Employer: National Geographic (1927–1969)
- Known for: First image on the cover of National Geographic
- Spouse: Lilian Louise Heald (m. 1935)
- Children: B. Anthony Stewart Jr.
- Awards: National Press Photographers Association

Benjamín Anthony Stewart (August 20, 1904 – June 5, 1977) was an American photographer with National Geographic. Stewart is known for having the first image featured on the cover of the magazine, that of the 49-star flag of the United States after Alaska's admission to the Union as a U.S. state. He is credited with more than one-hundred photos in the publication, five of which were featured on the cover.

== Life ==
Stewart was born Benjamín Anthony Stewart on August 20, 1904, in Lynch Station, Virginia to Charles Frank Stewart and Martha E. Anthony. In 1935 after an assignment for National Geographic located in Maine, Stewart met and married Lilian Heald, they had one son together, B. Anthony Stewart Jr.

== Career ==
His specialty was the "geographic" scene. That is, pictures of foreign countries that portrayed the land the way people lived... He has an inherent ability to make a pretty picture out of something that is not necessarily attractive to the average person.

— Jack Fletcher (Colleague), Washington Post (1977)

Stewart started his career at National Geographic as the photo lab's bookkeeper in 1927. During his forty-two-year employment with the magazine he moved up the hierarchy to become the Chief photographer for the publication. When color photography was in its infancy, Stewart was one of the first photographers to capture extensive images with both the view camera and the 35 mm camera. When he was asked to complete his first major assignment, a photo spread of the U.S. State of Maine, the magazine expanded the usual sixteen-page spread to thirty-two pages.

In the summer of 1956, with his colleague David S. Boyer, he travelled through Scotland, taking photographs to illustrate Isobel Wylie Hutchison's article, "A Stroll to John o'Groats". Contributing over one-hundred photos throughout his career, the subjects of Stewart's stories have featured locations around the globe such as Canada, Europe, South America and the Pacific Ocean. While on assignment in the Soviet Union, Stewart captured the reaction of the Russian people regarding the visit of then-Vice President of the United States Richard Nixon, after his "Kitchen Debate" with Nikita Khrushchev. The first photo to appear on the cover of National Geographic was in the July 1959 issue of the magazine of which Stewart is credited for. The cover story titled "New Stars for Old Glory" featured the 49-star flag of the United States after Alaska's admission to the Union as a U.S. state, which was signed into law on July 3, 1959, by President Dwight D. Eisenhower.

== Death and legacy ==
Stewart died on June 5, 1977, in Lynchburg, Virginia.

=== Christie's auction house ===
After Stewarts death, four of his photos have been sold at Christie's auction house in London.

- c. 1939 Women Greeting a Pan Am Flight: Texas, (Sold 2013).
- c. 1941 Oil Field: Signal Hill, California, (Sold 2012).
- c. 1941 Wildflowers on Route 99: San Joaquin Valley, California, (Sold 2013).
- c. 1945 Lake George: Lake George, New York, (Sold 2013).

== Awards ==
- White House News Photographers Association
- National Press Photographers Association

== Bibliography ==
=== National Geographic cover stories ===
Stewart has contributed five published articles featured on the cover of National Geographic.

National Geographic cover stories
#	Title	Year	Photo	Location	Ref
1	New Stars for Old Glory	1959	49-star flag of the United States	Alaska	
2	California's Wonderful One	1959	Golden Gate Bridge	California	
3	Inside the White House	1961	White House	Washington, D.C.	
4	United Nations: Capital of the Family Man	1961	Headquarters of the United Nations	New York	
5	Puerto Rico's Seven-League Bootstraps	1962	RMS Empress of Canada	Puerto Rico	

== See also ==
- List of National Geographic cover stories (1959 and 1960s)

== Notes ==
a. Photograph not credited in the magazine, but is at the preceding reference
