= Melville Bell =

Melville Bell may refer to:

- Alexander Melville Bell (1819–1905), Scots teacher and researcher of phonetics, etc.
- Melville Bell Grosvenor (1901–1982), American magazine editor

== See also ==
- Melville Bull
