= Sochůrek =

Sochůrek (feminine: Sochůrková) is a Czech surname. It is a diminutive of the surnames Sochor and Sochora and the word sochor, which means 'thick rod' or 'crowbar', but figuratively it meant "strong man". An Anglicised and Germanised form of the surname is Sochurek. Notable people with the surname include:

- Howard Sochurek (1924–1994), American photojournalist
- Hugo Sochůrek (born 2008), Czech footballer
