= Joseph Judge =

American writer and editor (1928–1996)

Joseph Judge (February 4, 1928—April 20, 1996) was a writer and editor for National Geographic magazine, retiring as Senior Associate Editor in 1990 after 25 years of service.

== Early life ==
Judge was born in Washington, D.C. His parents were Joe Judge, the baseball player, and Alma Gauvreau Judge. He attended Gonzaga College High School and then The Catholic University of America, graduating in 1950. He served in the United States Army and subsequently worked for Life magazine in New York. He married Phyllis Mitchell of Scituate, Massachusetts in 1956.

== Government career ==
Judge returned to Washington to work as a special assistant at the United States Department of Labor, working in the Eisenhower and Kennedy administrations.

== National Geographic career ==
As a writer for National Geographic, Judge wrote articles on Monticello (Thomas Jefferson's home); Williamsburg; Washington, D.C.; Boston, Massachusetts; New Orleans, Louisiana; Florence, Italy; South Africa; Australia and many other places.

During his tenure as Senior Associate Editor (1985–1990), Judge was noted for taking on controversial topics, including disputes about the discovery of America and the discovery of the North Pole. Under his leadership, the magazine also made efforts to attract a younger and more urbanized audience. Judge was ousted from National Geographic in April 1990 (along with many other members of the editorial staff, including editor Wilbur E. Garrett) as Gilbert M. Grosvenor, grandson of one of the Society's founders, took personal charge of the magazine.

In November 1986, after five years of research, Judge wrote and published Columbus's First Landfall in the New World which advocated Samana Cay in the Bahamas as the true location of Guanahani, the first island seen by Christopher Columbus on his first voyage to America. (This idea had first been proposed by Gustavus Fox in 1882). Prior to that time, official National Geographic Society maps had shown San Salvador Island as the first landfall. While Judge's theory attracted some support, and drew attention to the many shortcomings of San Salvador, the issue remains unsettled.

In 1983, CBS television had aired "The Race to the Pole," a docudrama about Dr. Frederick Cook and his alleged trip to the North Pole in 1908—a claim that was widely discredited at the time, but treated approvingly by CBS. Shortly afterward, the family of Robert E. Peary, Cook's rival, appealed to the National Geographic Society for help in restoring Peary's reputation. Significantly, the family offered to open Peary's personal papers, which contained many items unseen by historians, to help settle the issue. Judge hired noted polar explorer Wally Herbert to review the evidence. When Herbert's evaluation appeared—significantly placed in the Magazine's 100th anniversary issue of September 1988—he concluded that although Peary came close to the Pole, he did not actually reach it. Herbert's view is today shared by many polar historians.

But the magazine quickly backtracked from Herbert's position, apparently under pressure. Within months, National Geographic Society had hired another group of experts, the Navigation Foundation under the leadership of Adm. William Davies, to make yet another review of the evidence. In January 1990, the magazine published Davies' findings, based on analysis of shadows seen on photographs taken by Peary in 1909. Davies' analysis vindicated Peary, and the official stamp of approval on the National Geographic's reversal of position was given by no less than the Society's president Gilbert M. Grosvenor, in a signed letter appearing in the pages of the magazine. This incident could not have been beneficial for the editorial staff; Judge and a dozen other senior staffers were let go from National Geographic magazine on April 17, 1990 after what was officially described as several months of dispute over editorial content.

== Other works and retirement ==
Following his retirement from National Geographic, Judge was the author of Season of Fire: The Confederate Strike on Washington (Rockbridge, 1994), about the exploits of Gen. Jubal A. Early, who twice led his troops to the capital gates in 1864. He also authored a book of poetry about life in Alaska called Toughing it Out. Judge remained interested in the Columbus landfall problem until the end of his life. His papers concerning this topic were donated to the Mariners' Museum in Virginia.

His son, Mark Judge, also became a journalist, and wrote a book called God and Man at Georgetown Prep: How I Became a Catholic Despite 20 Years of Catholic Schooling, describing how his father's Catholicism helped him regain his faith later in life. Another son, Joseph Mitchell Judge, is curator of the Hampton Roads Naval Museum.
