= Thomas J. Abercrombie =

American journalist and photographer

- Born: 13 August 1930; Stillwater, Minnesota, United States
- Died: 3 April 2006 (aged 75); Baltimore, Maryland
- Occupations: Senior Staff Photographer and Writer for National Geographic Magazine
- Spouse: Marilyn "Lynn" Bruette Abercrombie
- Writing career
- Notable awards: NPPA National Newspaper Photographer of the Year (1954), NPPA National Magazine Photographer of the Year (1959)

Thomas J. Abercrombie (August 13, 1930 – April 3, 2006) was a senior staff writer and photographer for National Geographic, well known for his work on Middle Eastern countries. During his tenure at the Geographic magazine, Abercrombie travelled to all seven continents, becoming the first staff photojournalist to travel to the South Pole in 1956 while providing photographs for Paul Siple's coverage of the first overwinter stay at the South Pole Station. Other notable coverage includes his photographs of Jacques Cousteau and his crew aboard Cousteau's vessel the Calypso and the transit of the first white tiger from India to the United States. Abercrombie was the first Western journalist to cover the Islamic pilgrimage to Mecca in his article Beyond the Sands of Mecca, published 1966.

== Early life ==
Born in Stillwater, Minnesota, Abercrombie started his career at the Fargo Forum and the Milwaukee Journal. He is an alumnus of Macalester College. His innovative and stunning photographs quickly drew attention and acclaim. By designing an underwater housing (commercially unavailable at the time), Abercrombie pushed the frontiers of photography when he photographed a shipwreck at the bottom of Lake Michigan. Surreal portraits of wife, Lynn Abercrombie, distorted by reflections in stainless steel cook and house ware were published in Life Magazine. His photograph of a robin straining to extract an earthworm from a dramatically low angle caught the eye of Melville Bell Grosvenor at the National Geographic.

== National Geographic ==
He was invited to work at National Geographic, where his first report was from Lebanon. He had never been abroad before.

As a staff member of National Geographic, Abercrombie was best known for his work in Arab countries, visited all seven continents, and was one of the first two journalists to reach the South Pole in 1957 (the other was Rolla J. "Bud" Crick of the Oregon Journal). Abercrombie was the first person to win both the Newspaper Photographer of the year (1954) and the magazine photographer of the year (1959). He dived with Jacques Cousteau who said it "was like swimming with a fish".

Mr. Abercrombie visited all seven continents, and he seemed to have seen nearly everything on them, around them and between them, from the Empty Quarter of Saudi Arabia to the megaliths of Easter Island. He traveled to Japan, Indonesia, Iran and the Asiatic republics of what was then the Soviet Union. He visited nearly every country of the Middle East and became so enamored of the region's people and culture that he converted to Islam in 1964, taking the name Omar.

He was the magazine's expert on the Middle East, and reported from Mecca. He covered the region from Morocco to Afghanistan for more than three decades, until he retired in 1994. During his forty years at National Geographic, he published forty stories from all around the world.

== Retirement ==
After retiring from National Geographic in 1993, Abercrombie taught geography at George Washington University. He was fluent in five languages (Arabic, English, German, French, and Spanish).

Abercrombie died at Johns Hopkins Hospital, Baltimore, Maryland of complications from open-heart surgery. He was survived by his wife, Lynn, and children Mari, executive director of Windover Art Center, and Bruce, a videographer.

== Legacy ==
Abercrombie's photojournalism career is documented in the 2004 film, White Tiger: The Adventures of Thomas J. Abercrombie, by filmmaker Patricia A. Leone, Blue Marlin Productions, Progressive IMG and Gabriel Film Group with original music score by Kevin Harkins. The film showed at the New York International Independent Film and Video Festival.

The August 2006 issue of National Geographic included an Abercrombie tribute article, "A Geographic Life" . In addition, the Abercrombie Crests of Antarctica are named in his honor.

Abercrombie is also one of four pioneering photographers to be honored in Odysseys and Photographs book published by the National Geographic Society, along with an exhibition at the National Geographic Museum in Washington, D.C. and in London.
