= Kendall Myers =

American spy (1937–2026)

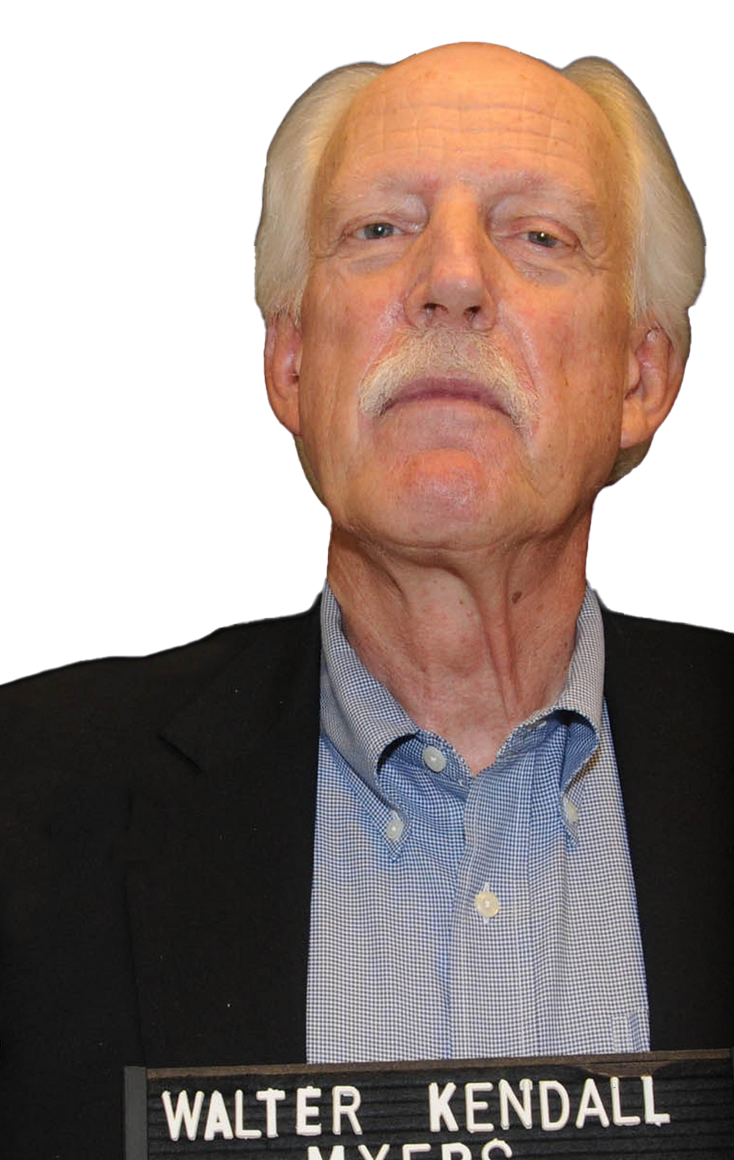
- Myers's FBI mugshot, c. 2009
- Born: Walter Kendall Myers; April 15, 1937; Washington, D.C., U.S.
- Died: March 12, 2026 (aged 88); MCFP Springfield, Missouri, U.S.
- Education: Johns Hopkins University (PhD)
- Occupation: FSI official
- Criminal charges: 18 U.S.C. § 371; 18 U.S.C. § 951; 18 U.S.C. § 1343
- Criminal penalty: Life imprisonment without possibility of parole
- Criminal status: Deceased
- Spouse: Gwendolyn Myers (m. 1982)
- Espionage activity
- Country: United States
- Allegiance: Cuba
- Service years: 1977–2009
- Codename: Agent 202

Walter Kendall Myers (April 15, 1937 – March 12, 2026) was a U.S. State Department employee who, with his wife, Gwendolyn Steingraber Myers, was arrested and indicted on June 4, 2009, on charges of spying for Cuba for nearly 30 years. He was convicted of espionage and sentenced to life imprisonment by a U.S. federal court in July 2010.

== Background ==
Kendall Myers was born in Washington, D.C., on April 15, 1937. He was the grandson of Gilbert Hovey Grosvenor and great-grandson of Alexander Graham Bell. Myers was also related to William Howard Taft through his father. He was educated at Mercersburg Academy, a private preparatory boarding school in Mercersburg, Pennsylvania. He graduated from Brown University in Providence, Rhode Island, and earned a Ph.D. in European history from Johns Hopkins University's School of Advanced International Studies (SAIS) in Washington, D.C. In 1977, he began working for the U.S. State Department as a contract instructor at its Foreign Service Institute, and for 20 years he was a part-time faculty member at SAIS. From 2000 until his retirement in October 2007, he worked as a European analyst in the State Department's Bureau of Intelligence and Research (INR). Myers's State Department service was primarily in domestic positions.

== US–UK "special relationship" controversy ==
In November 2006, Myers created controversy by describing the "special relationship" between the United States and the United Kingdom as "one-sided" and a "myth". He said that he was "ashamed" of the treatment of Prime Minister Tony Blair by U.S. President George W. Bush. Then UK MP Denis MacShane responded, "After the Republican defeat in the midterm election, every little rat who feasted during the Bush years is now leaving the ship. I would respect this gentleman, who I have never heard of, if he had had the guts to make any of these points two or five years ago."

The U.S. State Department distanced itself from Myers's comments, stating, "He was speaking as an academic, not as a representative of the State Department."

== Espionage charge ==
On June 4, 2009, Myers and his wife were arrested and charged with acting as illegal agents of and providing classified information to the Cuban government for nearly 30 years, as well as wire fraud. Authorities said the Myerses were caught by an FBI undercover operation and had been spying for Cuba for "nearly three decades". Myers's arrest was the culmination of a three-year joint FBI/Department of State Diplomatic Security Service investigation. Based on general information provided by the FBI, the Diplomatic Security Service conducted a comprehensive internal investigation that resulted in the identification of Myers as the probable Cuban agent, and ultimately led to his arrest. The authorities also said that Myers usually relied on his memory or notes for information rather than stealing documents. The couple allegedly used shortwave radio to communicate with Cuban intelligence and also were said to have met with Cuban agents in numerous locations both inside and outside the United States. Myers told undercover agents that he had spent an evening with Fidel Castro in 1995.

=== Alleged motive ===
It is alleged that the Myers's actions may not have been prompted by greed, but more by ideology. According to a law enforcement official, they were "true believers" in the Cuban system. The United States federal affidavit quoted a diary entry by Kendall Myers as saying, "I can see nothing of value that has been lost by the revolution. The revolution has released enormous potential and liberated the Cuban spirit", and referring to Fidel Castro as "one of the great political leaders of our time". Other entries reference a comparison of health care in the United States and healthcare in Cuba, and "complacency about the poor" in the United States.

=== Court case ===
The Myerses pleaded guilty on November 20, 2009, at a hearing before Judge Reggie Walton in a U.S. District Court. Myers, 72, pled guilty to a three-count criminal investigation charging him with conspiracy to commit espionage and two counts of wire fraud. His wife pleaded guilty to a one-count criminal information charging her with conspiracy to gather and transmit national defense information. As part of his plea agreement, Kendall Myers agreed to serve a life prison sentence and to cooperate fully with the United States government regarding any criminal activity and intelligence activity by him or others. As part of her plea agreement, Gwendolyn agreed to serve a sentence of between six and seven and a half years in prison and to cooperate fully with the government.

On July 16, 2010, Kendall Myers was sentenced to life imprisonment without possibility of parole, and Gwendolyn was sentenced to a total of 81 months in prison. Gwendolyn was released in 2015.

Kendall Myers died from cancer in prison, on March 12, 2026, at the age of 88.

== Reaction ==
=== United States ===
Secretary of State Hillary Clinton ordered a damage assessment be done to investigate the extent of harm done to U.S. security. In addition, Clinton directed the State Department to conduct a comprehensive damage assessment in coordination with the intelligence community in line with established damages protocols and regulations.

=== Cuba ===
I can't help but admire their disinterested and courageous conduct on behalf of Cuba. Those who in one form or another have helped to protect the Cuban people from the terrorist plans and assassination plots organised by various U.S. administrations have done so at the initiative of their own conscience and are deserving, in my judgment, of all the honours in the world.

— Fidel Castro, days after the Myers couple's arrest

Upon hearing the news of Myers's arrest, Castro stated that the case read like "an espionage comic strip". Castro declined to say whether the Myers couple really had passed secrets to the Cuban government, but added that they deserved praise if they did.

== See also ==
- Ana Montes
- Manuel Rocha
