= Helen and Frank Schreider =

American explorers and travel writers

Helen Schreider
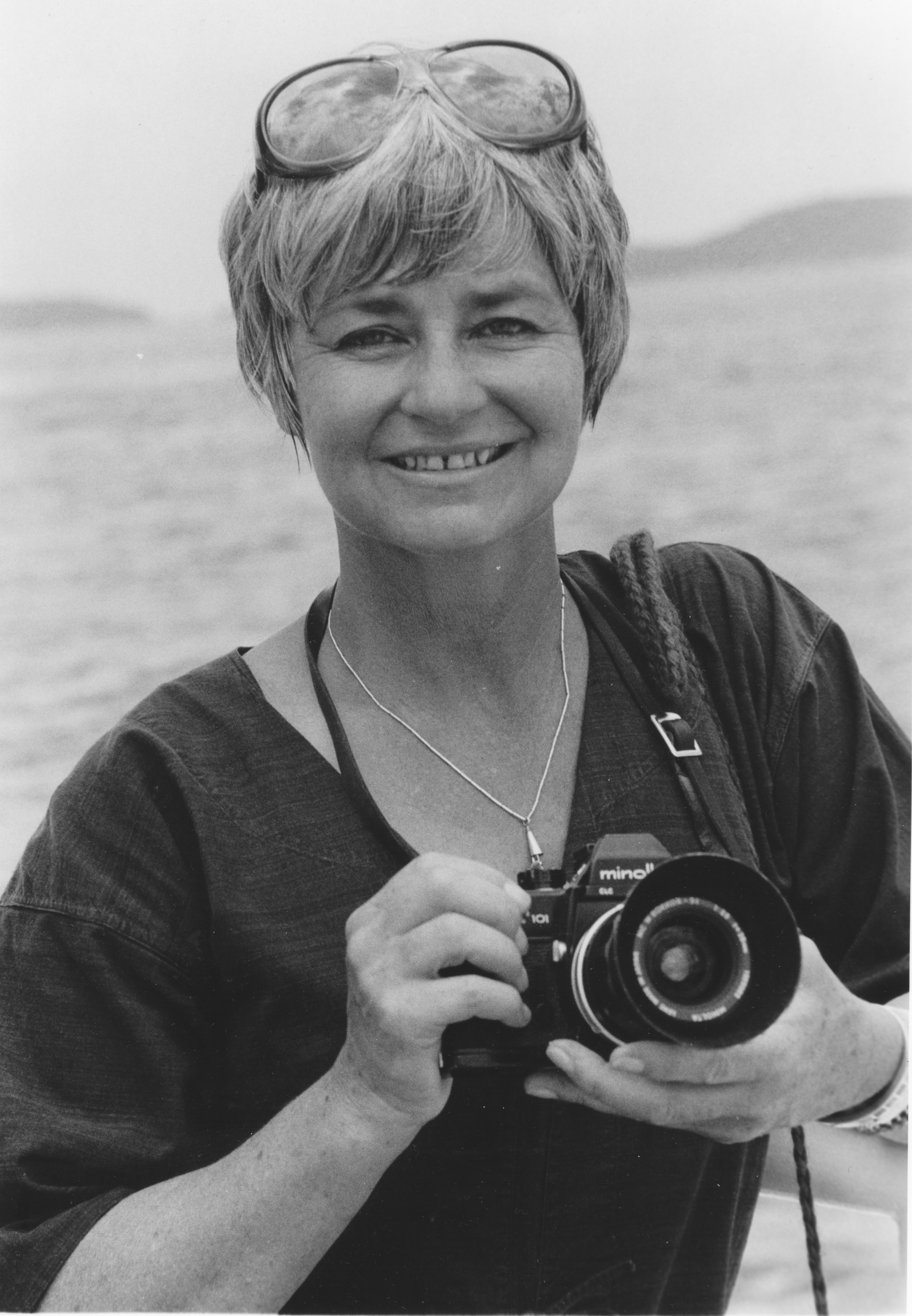
- Born: Helen Jane Armstrong; May 3, 1926; Coalinga, California, U.S.
- Died: February 6, 2025 (aged 98); Santa Rosa, California, U.S.
- Education: UCLA (B.A., Fine Arts)
- Known for: Explorer and adventurer; artist (painting and drawing)
- Spouse: Frank Schreider
- Honors: Fellow National of The Explorers Club

Frank Schreider
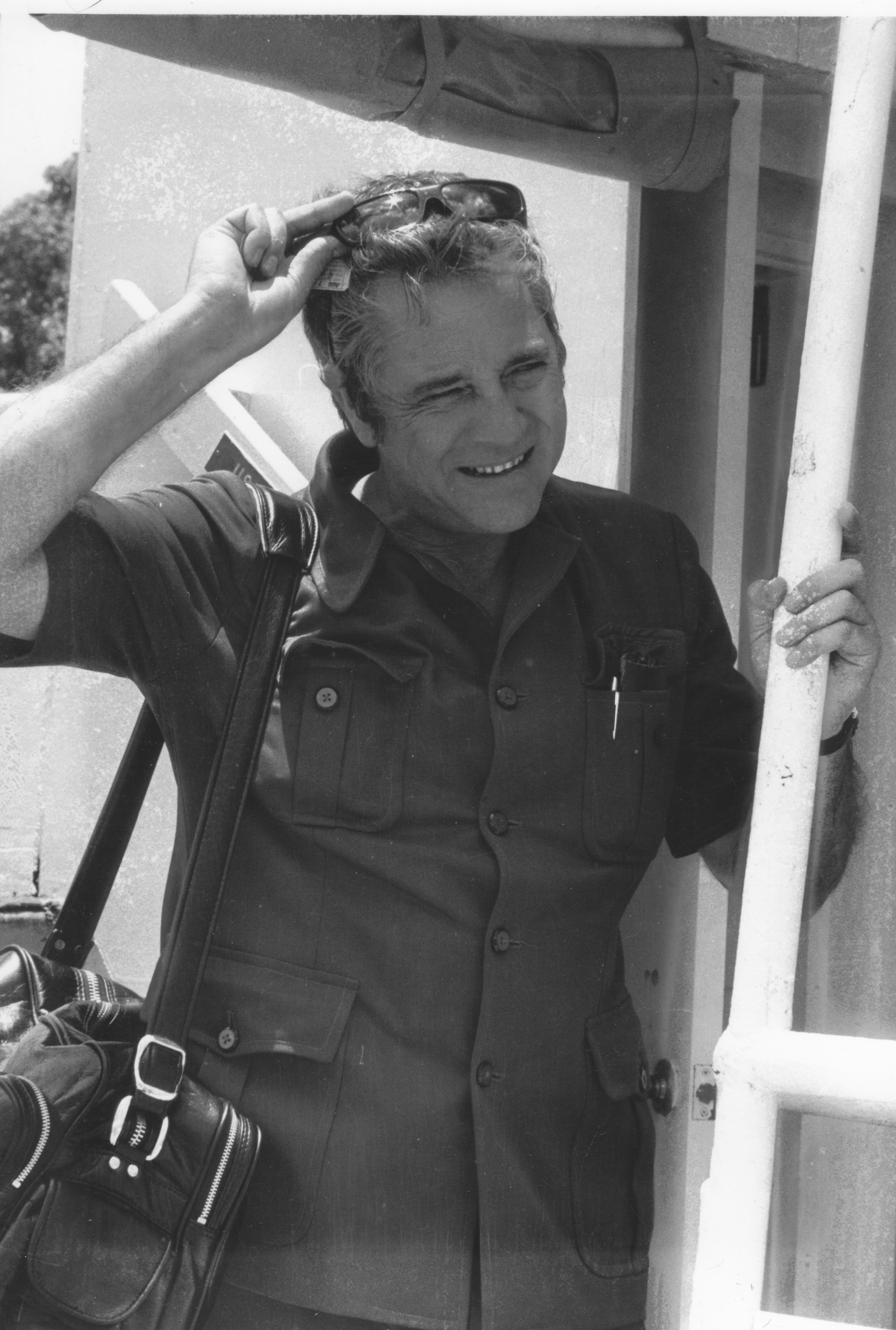
- Born: Franklin David Schreider; January 8, 1924; Denver, Colorado
- Died: January 21, 1994 (aged 70); Crete, Greece
- Education: UCLA (B.Sc., Eng.)
- Known for: Explorer and adventurer; writer and photographer
- Spouse: Helen Schreider
- Honors: Member of The Explorers Club

Helen Jane Schreider (née Armstrong; May 3, 1926 – February 6, 2025) and Frank Schreider (January 8, 1924 – January 21, 1994) were American explorers in the mid-20th century, known for traveling by amphibious jeep. National Geographic hired them after their first independent journey from Alaska to Tierra del Fuego (1954–56). They were the first people to travel the length of the Americas solely by means of their own power. They completed six additional expeditions through National Geographic, working freelance at first and later as foreign editorial staff, for fifteen years, from 1956 to 1970. They worked as a team and lived for periods of time in about 50 countries on five continents. Helen and Frank Schreider were known for their ability to write, photograph and film within the cultures they visited. They wrote three books, six major articles for National Geographic, and contributed to nine other books. They also made three separate nationwide speaking tours with their films.

== Early exploration ==
Frank and Helen met at the University of California at Los Angeles, where Frank studied engineering and Helen fine arts. They married in 1947, but it wasn't until February 1951 that they embarked on a belated honeymoon, beginning their life of exploration and adventure. With their German shepherd Dinah they set out in a jeep for a jaunt to South America, but four months later they were back, disillusioned and broke. They had gotten only as far as Costa Rica, where they hit a "wall of mountains," as the Pan American Highway had not yet been completed.

Following this experience, they realized that to bypass the mountains of Costa Rica and the jungles of Panama they would need an amphibious vehicle in order to go by sea when they couldn't get through on land.

In the fall of 1951, Frank found an old rusty World War II amphibious jeep in a junkyard. He began the work to rebuild the engine and to repair the hull, while Helen designed the interior storage and living space.

Before the Schreiders could set off on another venture, they needed to raise money, so before finishing the jeep repairs they left for a two-year job at an air force base in Anchorage, Alaska. While there they expanded their dreams of adventure. They would start their journey at Circle, Alaska, the northernmost town in North America, and they’d travel to the end of Argentina to Ushuaia on the island of Tierra del Fuego, the world's southernmost town. This would be a journey of 20,000 miles.

The Schreiders started their journey from Circle on June 21, 1954, arriving in California a couple of weeks later where they continued to work on the rehabilitation of the amphibious jeep. Months later, christened with a Coke bottle, "La Tortuga," the two-and-a-half ton turtle was born. The craft was successfully launched in a calm bay in Los Angeles – making front-page news in the Los Angeles Times.

On January 1, 1955, they began the next phase of their journey. At the southern end of Mexico the highway gave way to 200 miles of oxcart tracks through thick jungle. Navigating this tangle of trees, vines, boulders and mud, with the help of local people and their machetes, they finally reached the wall of mountains in Costa Rica that had blocked them four years earlier. This time they turned to the coastline to go by sea but there was no calm bay to enter the ocean. They had to launch from the beach into twenty-foot waves, nearly ending their journey before it truly began.

La Tortuga proved to be seaworthy and they entered the Pacific on four occasions and survived four terrifying days in rough ocean water. They were then misled by a friendly fisherman to go inland on a small river to a supposed road, which turned out to be not a road but a railroad. In desperation, they drove 35 miles on the railroad, bouncing along the ties, which almost destroyed La Tortuga. Somehow they survived, got themselves to Panama City where it took Frank six weeks (and considerable expense) to repair La Tortuga.

On May 11 they passed through the Panama Canal, but this was an adventure in itself, with La Tortuga looking like a minnow beside the huge ships. The officer in charge of the Panama Canal Zone, Admiral Miles, tried in vain to dissuade them from entering the Caribbean. In parting, the admiral said that if they made it through the Caribbean to South America and Tierra del Fuego, he would recommend Frank to the Explorers Club.

After the Panama Canal they survived a perilous 300-mile journey on the Caribbean. To escape violent storms they sought refuge on islands inhabited by the San Blas Indians. Initially, these isolated people thought La Tortuga was a sea monster, but upon seeing the Schreiders and Dinah, they treated them with great hospitality. Finally they arrived on dry land in Colombia after a month at sea.

From Colombia they continued through Ecuador, and while in Peru took La Tortuga all the way to the remote ruins of Machu Picchu, where they found it deserted but for themselves. Afterwards, often with no roads to speak of, they traversed Bolivia to Chile, where La Tortuga sailed 50 miles across three interconnected lakes to get to Argentina and proceed to its southern tip.

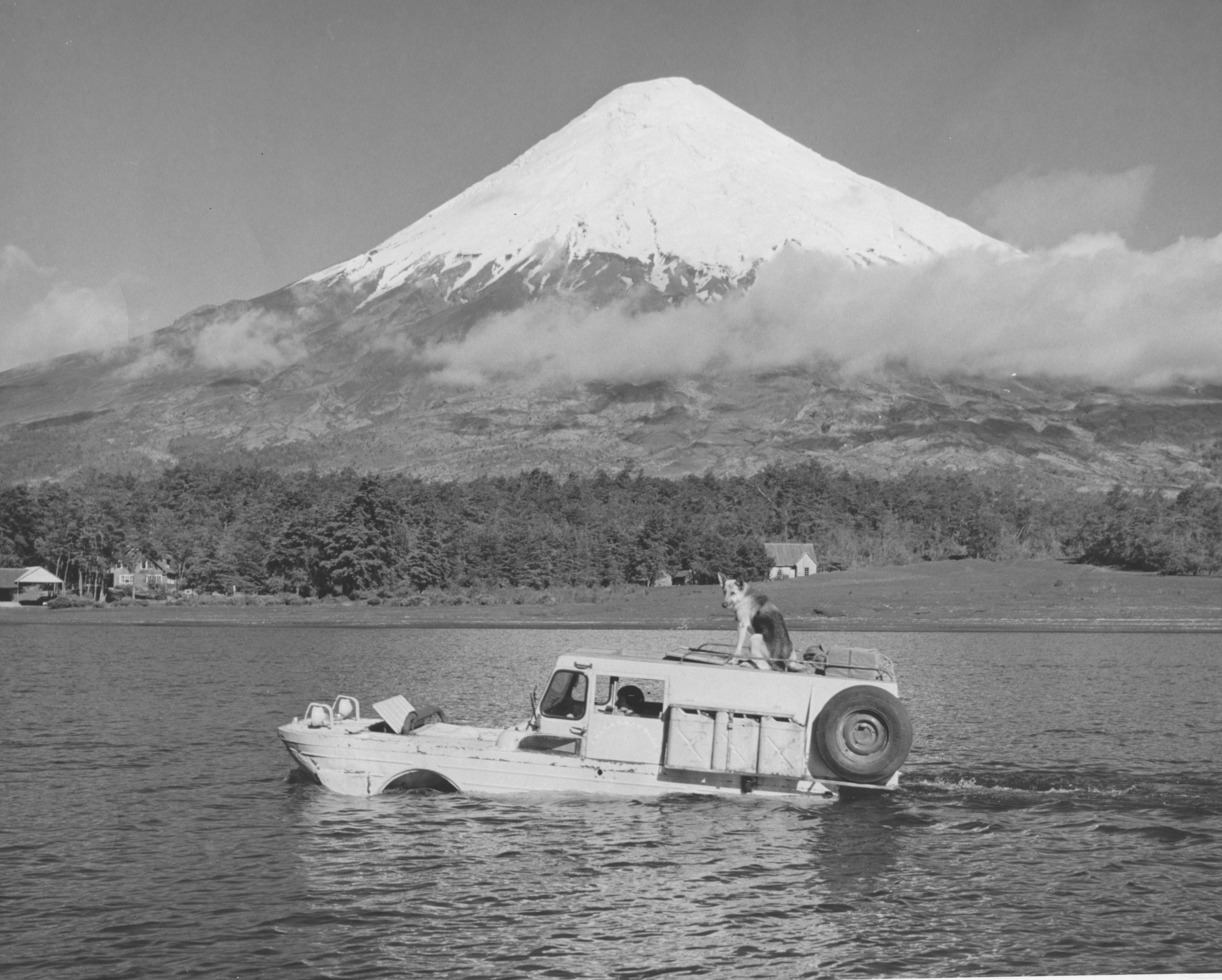
La Tortuga crossing Lake Todos los Santos, at the base of Mount Osorno in Chile.

They then crossed the treacherous Strait of Magellan and finally landed on Tierra del Fuego.

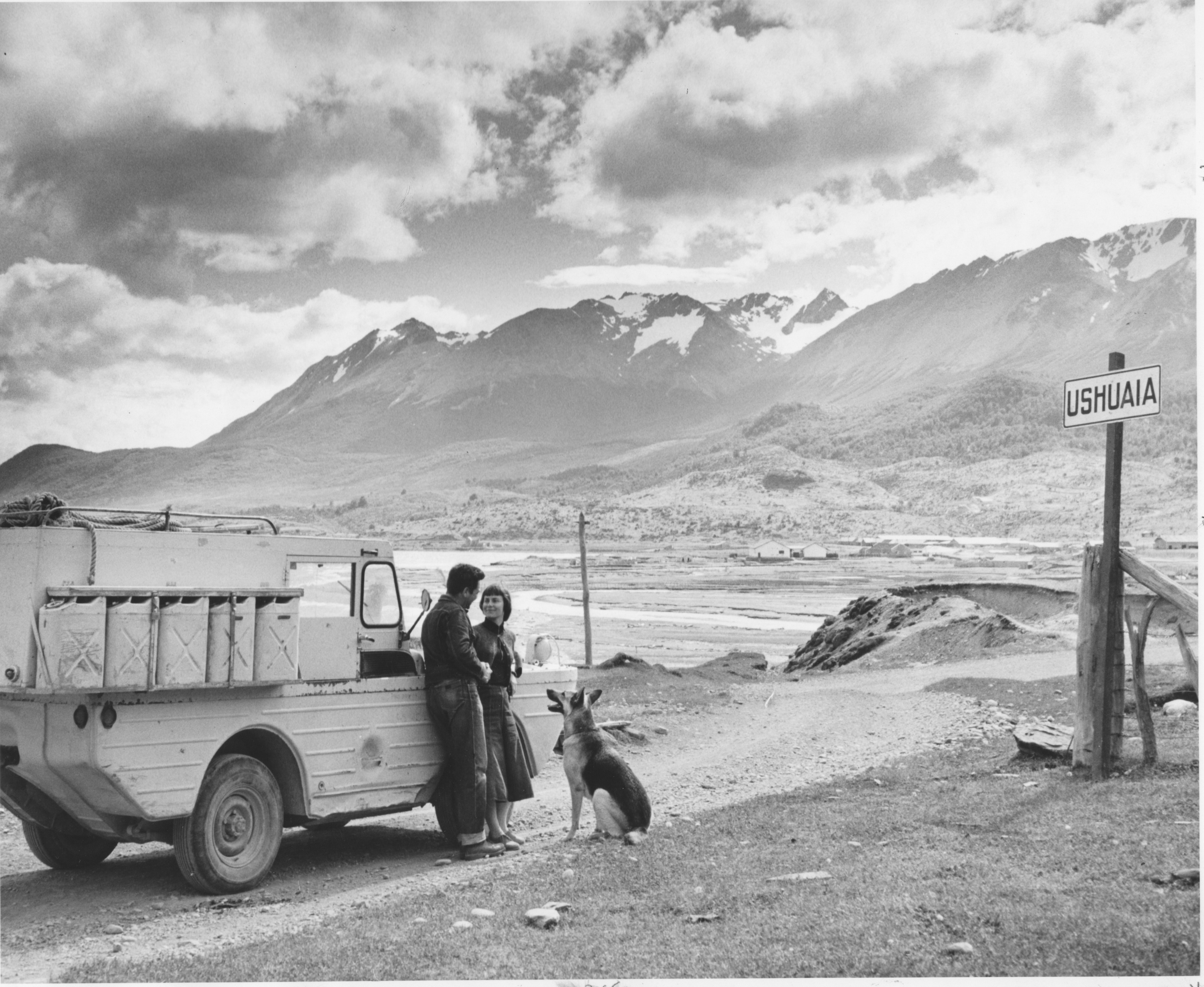
La Tortuga, Frank, Helen and Dinah at Ushuaia.

From the beach where they landed, a road building crew struggled to help them push and pull La Tortuga through an unfinished road to Ushuaia, finally reaching their goal on January 23, 1956. La Tortuga was the first vehicle to ever arrive on the island on its own power, for which it was issued an Ushuaia license plate #1. Only then were they able to reassure their families and friends back home that they survived their journey. Fortuitously, a few days later, an officer of the Argentine Navy invited them, along with the battered Tortuga, to board a freighter for Buenos Aires, and eventually they arrived back home in California on April 9, 1956.

Frank started writing about their travels while on board the ship and within a few months he completed their book 20,000 Miles South, which Doubleday published in 1957. In addition to their Doubleday contract, they also sold the story to Saturday Evening Post, which ran a five-week serial on their adventure.

During their travels, in addition to photographs, they filmed their journey on a 16 mm Bolex camera. After editing the film on their return, they were booked on a speaking tour throughout the US and parts of Canada. They would stand on stage (with Dinah of course) speaking on microphones, narrating the journey live, while the film played behind them. At one of the first such events at Constitution Hall in Washington DC, Dr. Melville Bell Grosvenor approached them and asked them to work for National Geographic. He wanted them to do more amphibious jeep expeditions to foreign lands.

After their presentation at Constitution Hall, the nationally syndicated columnist, Ed Koterba wrote that "all other travel settings on the surface of this earth must be anti-climactic after the Schreider voyage" and that their amphibious jeep, "La Tortuga," should be placed in the Smithsonian Museum "right along with the Spirit of St. Louis and other dramatic symbols of ‘famous firsts.’"

Shortly after the Schreiders successfully completed their journey, Admiral Milton Miles of the US Navy recommended Frank to the Explorers Club, and on September 17, 1956 Frank was inducted as a member.

== National Geographic expeditions (1957–1961) – The Ganges and Indonesia ==
For their first trip for National Geographic, the Schreiders needed a new jeep. They found a pristine amphibious jeep that had never been used, one that a collector had kept in perfect condition since the war. Tortuga II was quickly ready and became their home as they traversed the Ganges River, through India over a five-month period, during 1957-58. Their lengthy article on the Ganges appeared in National Geographic in 1960. Also, Dr. Melville Bell Grosvenor met them in India during their journey and described their adventures in considerable detail in his report "A message from your Society’s President."

After India, the Schreiders set off on their next expedition, this time, to Indonesia – for a challenging and dangerous 5,000-mile journey by land and sea from Sumatra to East Timor. Aside from the dangers of the journey, they were also subjected to the bureaucracy and military tension gripping the archipelago at this time. Often the beauty of the landscape and people were offset by the arduous task of waiting for permission to travel. The grim soldiers they encountered were in stark contrast to the overall cheerful and welcoming Indonesian people. A detailed account of their thirteen-month odyssey is presented in their book The Drums of Tonkin. In 1990 excerpts from the book were published in Java: A Traveller's Anthology. They also published two major articles on their Indonesia trip in National Geographic, in 1960 and 1961. On their return to the US, they embarked on a speaking tour that included Canada, again narrating their film live from the stage.

== National Geographic expeditions (1962–1970) – The Great Rift Valley, Alexander the Great, Taiwan, the Amazon ==
After their Indonesian expedition, National Geographic hired the Schreiders as full-time staff, and sent them to explore the Great Rift Valley through Africa by Land Rover. Early in their travels they were invited to meet King Hussein of Jordan. Their journey is referred to in several sections of Linda Street's book Veils and Daggers: A Century of National Geographic's Representation of the Arab World. Afterwards, their pace increased, often leaving for the next journey before the last one had been published. From the Great Rift Valley, they went straight into their next expedition which was to follow in the footsteps of Alexander the Great – 24,000 miles – from Greece to India, across the Middle East, again by Land Rover. Years later National Geographic used one of Helen's Alexander assignment photos of an evening desert scene in Iran in their book, National Geographic Photographs: The Milestones. Their next assignment was to survey the situation in Taiwan. In the course of this they interviewed Madam and Chiang Kai-shek in their home where they were living in seclusion.

The group traveled between nations, meeting various dignitaries and documenting the cultures, people, and landscapes they encountered.

Their last trip took them to the source of the Amazon River, where they built a wooden boat from an abandoned hull and named her "The Amazon Queen." Their new German shepherd, Balthazar, accompanied the couple as they managed to navigate and map the entire Amazon River, concluding that it was longer than the Nile. Highly enthused, they returned home to the National Geographic headquarters in Washington DC, but they were abruptly told by the head cartographer that he didn't want to see their maps and documents, adding, "Everyone knows the Nile is the longest river in the world" – and they were curtly dismissed. This led to further disillusionment with National Geographic, causing the Schreiders to resign from the company in 1970, the year that their book Exploring the Amazon was published. Years later, in 2007, Brazilian scientists claimed that the Amazon is longer than the Nile and therefore is the longest river in the world. So the Schreiders might have been right after all, 37 years earlier than the team of Brazilian scientists.

Actually, the Schreiders’ achievement had been acknowledged in the Guinness Book of World Records in 1971. It was further authenticated by Lowell Thomas in his April 20, 1970 broadcast: "Helen and Frank Schreider are the first to trace the mighty Amazon from its headwaters to its mouth . . . over four thousand miles to the Atlantic. Their exploits are fascinatingly described in their new book, Exploring the Amazon, published by National Geographic (1970) . . . concluding that the Amazon, not the Nile, is the world’s longest river." Also Elizabeth Fagg Olds in her book Women of the Four Winds states that the explorer Annie Smith Peck found that Schreiders’ book Exploring the Amazon was "helpful as background on the debated question of the river’s source."

== Life after National Geographic (post 1970) ==
After their years at National Geographic, Helen and Frank each followed their own individual careers. At first Frank began as a free-lancer, writing for many magazines, including Time, Look and Sail. Later he joined the U.S. Foreign Service and was sent to Mexico City to work for the United States Information Agency, where he was the editor of Saber, their Spanish-language magazine. Upon retirement he continued his love of sailing, which included crossing the Atlantic in his boat, Sassafras. The Schreiders shared one last adventure together in the fall of 1993 sailing for four months among the Greek islands. Shortly after, in January 1994 Frank suddenly and unexpectedly died of a heart attack while on Sassafras when it was moored at Crete.

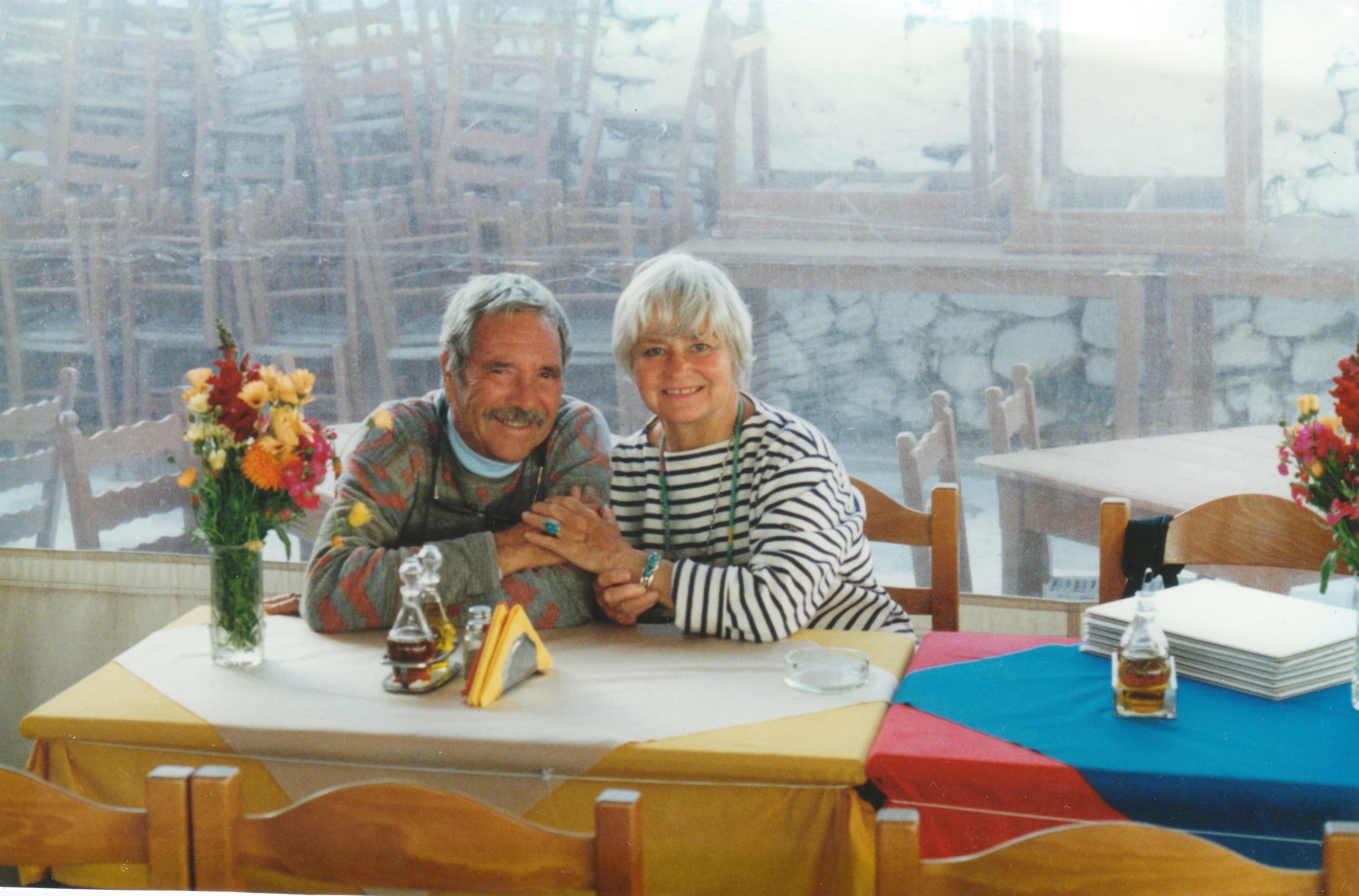
Frank and Helen in Greece 1993.

After leaving National Geographic, Helen joined the National Park Service as a museum designer. Her first assignment was to design and assemble the Bicentennial Exhibition within the Statue of Liberty. At the official ceremony in 1976 she was congratulated for her work by the French ambassador and later she received the Presidential Design Award from President Ford.

In addition to her Statue of Liberty exhibition, Helen Schreider set up the display of Bicentennial gifts at the White House "for the President to view, and the display at the Great Hall for the nation to see." In recognition of this she received a letter of thanks from the Deputy Special Assistant at the White House and a specially dedicated photo to her of President Ford, signed by him.

In Helen's ensuing work with the National Park Service she planned extensive museum exhibitions at Yellowstone National Park, the Big Hole Battlefield, Nez Perce, Mount Rainier and several other locales.

Although Helen worked with Frank as an explorer and later with the National Park Service, she had actually been an artist first and foremost throughout her life. With a fine arts degree from UCLA, she produced a great many paintings and drawings – many of them were done during her travels with Frank. Her drawings accompanied their photographs throughout their three books and their articles in National Geographic. In her 90s, Helen lived in a retirement community in Santa Rosa, CA, and continued to work as a painter.

Frank had been inducted as a member of the Explorers Club in 1956 but Helen wasn't since this was a club for men only. Eventually, women were also accepted but it wasn't until 2015 – 59 years later – that Helen finally caught up with Frank, becoming a Fellow National, not just a Member of the Explorers Club.

The Explorers Club includes every significant explorer in the world. This includes Robert E. Peary & Matthew Henson (first to the North Pole, 1909), Roald Amundsen (first to the South Pole, 1927), Sir Edmund Hillary (first to the summit of Mt. Everest, 1953), Neil Armstrong, Buzz Aldrin & Michael Collins (first to the surface of the Moon, 1969). By being members of the Club it placed Helen and Frank Schreider in the same league as these and all other major explorers in the world.

As a follow up on Helen's induction to the Explorers Club, Angela Schuster, the editor of the Explorers Journal, published an article "Reflections on the Amazon – in conversation with Helen Schreider" (Summer 2016). Ms. Schuster had arranged for a retired geography professor, John Ryan, and a film producer, Anna Darrah, to conduct an interview with Helen as the basis for her article.

In addition, after Helen's induction into the Explorers Club, Albuquerque TV and newspaper outlets interviewed her.

More than fifty years after the Schreiders' amphibious jeep travels, a group of adventurers led by Richard Coe had planned to travel from London to Sydney, Australia in a large U.S. military amphibious vehicle (to be called Tortuga III) that would have retraced the exact Asia route of the Schreider journey in their Tortuga II. The expedition does not appear to have happened, however.

Helen Schreider died on February 6, 2025, at the age of 98.
