= Paul A. Zahl =

American explorer and biologist

- Born: Paul Arthur Zahl; 1910; Bensenville, Illinois, United States
- Died: October 16, 1985 (aged 75); Greenwich, Connecticut, United States
- Education: North Central College, Harvard University
- Occupations: explorer and biologist
- Years active: 1939–1978
- Known for: senior scientist to the National Geographic Society
- Notable work: over fifty articles for National Geographic
- Spouse: married
- Children: 3

Paul Arthur Zahl (1910 – October 16, 1985) was an American explorer and biologist. He was a frequently published author and columnist as well as a respected photographer. He served as senior scientist to the National Geographic Society from 1958 to 1975.

== Early life and education ==
Zahl was born in 1910 in Bensenville, Illinois. He was an honors graduate of North Central College in Illinois, received his doctorate in experimental biology from Harvard University in 1936, and immediately became notable in cancer research at Haskins Laboratories.

== Career ==
He became increasingly interested in natural history. In 1939, Zahl wrote his first book, To the Lost World, about a trip he took to Mount Roraima in Venezuela. This interest led to research at New York's Museum of Natural History, and Zahl published Blindness: Modern Approaches to the Unseen Environment (1950), Flamingo Hunt (1952), and Coro-Coro: World of the Scarlet Ibis (1954).

In the 1950s, Zahl began to concentrate on his writing and photography career with National Geographic, serving as senior scientist of natural history for the National Geographic Society from 1958 to 1975. He always chose his subject matter rather than having it assigned, and all article photography was taken by him personally. His subject matters included coral reefs, volcanoes, giant frogs, carnivorous plants, seahorses, scorpions, Portuguese man o' war, piranhas, hatchetfish, butterflies, and slime molds. Zahl discovered the tallest redwood tree known at the time in the mid-1960s, which made the magazine's cover. Zahl also photographed the world's first known albino gorilla in Africa.

Between expeditions, Zahl did research for the National Cancer Institute, the National Science Foundation and the Atomic Energy Commission. During World War II, he served with the Office of Science Research and Development. His articles also appeared in Atlantic Magazine, Scientific American, Scientific Monthly, and in the 1960s he wrote a column for The American Scholar. He won many awards for photography and some of his work is on permanent display in New York's Museum of Modern Art.

Zahl wrote more articles for National Geographic than anyone else in its long history, over fifty articles from 1949 to 1978.

== Personal life ==
Zahl was married and had two children. At least sixteen of his articles included the entire Zahl family as they went off on adventurous vacations exploring the natural world. Up until 1959, the covers of the magazine had the famous yellow border and the black-on-white table of contents, but no photography. When photos were added, Eda Zahl was the first human being to grace the cover of the magazine, wearing diving apparatus.

=== Death ===
Zahl died of prostate cancer on October 16, 1985 in Greenwich, Connecticut. The National Geographic Society headquarters hung the American flag at half mast in his honor.
