= Catherine Grosvenor =

Scottish playwright and translator

- Born: 1978 (age 47–48); Edinburgh, Scotland
- Occupations: Playwright, translator
- Writing career
- Period: 2005-present
- Genre: Drama

Catherine Grosvenor (born 1978) is a Scottish playwright and translator.

== Early life ==
Grosvenor was born in Edinburgh, Scotland in 1978. During her teens, she developed a passion for languages while watching the films of Krzysztof Kieślowski. In 1997, she entered the University of Cambridge, where she studied German and Polish at Fitzwilliam College. At Cambridge, she began work on a translation of Tadeusz Słobodzianek's Our Class, which ran at the National Theatre in September 2009.

== Works ==
Grosvenor's first play, One Day All This Will Come to Nothing, premiered in 2005. It ran at the Traverse Theatre in Edinburgh between 22 March and 9 April and attracted a handful of positive reviews. This was followed by Lucky Lady, which was commissioned by Sweetscar and premiered at Glasgow's Tron Theatre in March 2007 as part of the Sure Shot series.

Cherry Blossom, her most successful play to date, premiered in 2008. The play, which features both English and Polish dialogue, was directed by Lorne Campbell and was commissioned and co-produced by the Traverse Theatre and the Teatr Polski in Bydgoszcz, Poland. It ran at the Traverse between 27 September and 11 October and received impressive reviews from The Herald and the Edinburgh Evening News. Both Cherry Blossom and One Day All This Will Come to Nothing have been published in paperback by Nick Hern Books.

As of 2010, Grosvenor was working on a new play entitled The Early Days of a Better Nation and a translation of a Polish play for the Royal Court Theatre.

=== Plays ===
- One Day All This Will Come to Nothing (2005)
- Lucky Lady (2007)
- Cherry Blossom (2008)

=== Translations ===
- Our Class by Tadeusz Slobodzianek (2009)
