= George F. Mobley =

American photographer (born 1935)

- Born: February 4, 1935 San Bernardino, CA
- Occupation: Photographer

George F. Mobley (born February 4, 1935) is an American photographer. His work has been published in National Geographic Magazine and elsewhere.
