= Kenneth Weaver =

Kenneth Franklin Weaver (November 29, 1915 – September 20, 2010) enjoyed a substantial 33-year career as a writer for the National Geographic Magazine. His prolific tenure with National Geographic produced articles encompassing a range of subjects until he retired as Senior Science Editor in 1985.

== Career ==
In 1952, Weaver was hired at The National Geographic in the legends department. "Legends" were, in fact, the captions that accompanied the innovative, often exotic photography that the Geographic pioneered at that time. Weaver's work was widely viewed, as the majority of Geographic subscribers primarily opened the magazine to peruse the pictures. Within the legends department, Weaver thrived, and he was quickly promoted to Staff Writer. His first Geographic article, entitled "Rip Van Winkle of the Underground: North America's Much Misunderstood Insect, the Periodical Cicada, Emerges After 17 Years in the Earth for a Fling in the Sun", was published in July 1953.

Weaver's career is particularly notable for his coverage of the NASA space program, when he authored titles including "Countdown for Space" in May 1961, "And Now to Touch the Moon's Forbidding Face", May 1969, and "Journey to Mars", February 1973. Weaver's articles were translated in many languages, bringing together people whose existences were drastically different, but who shared a single fascination with a subject that went beyond any cultural or political disparity at that time (most importantly, the Cold War space race between the US and Soviet Union).

All told, Weaver wrote 37 stories for The National Geographic, mostly within the Science beat. Upon his retirement, he wrote his last piece for the Geographic's November 1985 issue, entitled "The Search for Our Ancestors: Stones, Bones, and Early Man." It was the magazine's cover story that month, with a three-dimensional hologram depicting an ancient fossilized skull of a five-year-old child, preserved for more than a million years in a South African cave.

== List of articles ==
Weaver, Kenneth F. (July 1953), "Rip Van Winkle of the Underground: North America's Much Misunderstood Insect, the Periodical Cicada, Emerges After 17 Years in the Earth for a Fling in the Sun", The National Geographic, pp. 133–142
Weaver, Kenneth F. (Aug 1958), "How Old Is It? Telltale Radioactivity in Every Living Thing is Cracking the Riddle of Age", The National Geographic, pp. 234–255
Weaver, Kenneth F. (1961), "Project Mercury: Countdown for Space", The National Geographic, vol. 119, no. 5, pp. 702–734
Weaver, Kenneth F. (Feb 1962), "Tracking America's Man in Orbit", The National Geographic, pp. 184–217
Weaver, Kenneth F. (July 1963), "Athens: Her Golden Past Still Lights the World", The National Geographic, pp. 100–137
Weaver, Kenneth F. (Feb 1964), "The Five Worlds of Peru", The National Geographic, pp. 212–265
Weaver, Kenneth F. (Sep 1965), "Of Planes and Men: U.S. Air Force Wages Cold War and Hot", The National Geographic, pp. 298–349
Weaver, Kenneth F. (Apr 1966), "Space Rendezvous, Milestone on the Way to the Moon", The National Geographic, vol. 129, pp. 538–553, Bibcode:1966NaGe..129..538W
Weaver, Kenneth F. (Feb 1966), "Giant Comet Grazes the Sun", The National Geographic, pp. 258–261
Weaver, Kenneth F. (May 1967), "Magnetic Clues Help Date the Past", The National Geographic, pp. 696–701
Weaver, Kenneth F. (Nov 1967), "Historic Color Portrait of Earth From Space", The National Geographic, pp. 726–731
Weaver, Kenneth F. (Aug 1968), "Crystals, Magical Servants of the Space Age", The National Geographic, pp. 278–296
Weaver, Kenneth F. (May 1969), "And Now to Touch the Moon's Forbidding Face", The National Geographic, pp. 632–635
Weaver, Kenneth F. (Dec 1969), "The Flight of Apollo 11: "One Giant Leap For Mankind"; First Explorers on the Moon: The Incredible Story of Apollo 11", The National Geographic, pp. 752–787
Weaver, Kenneth F. (Jan 1969), "Remote Sensing: New Eyes to See the World", The National Geographic, pp. 46–73
Weaver, Kenneth F. (Feb 1969), "That Orbèd Maiden, with White Fire Laden, Whom Mortals Call the Moon", The National Geographic, pp. 206–230
Weaver, Kenneth F. (Dec 1969), "What the Moon Rocks Tell Us", The National Geographic, vol. 136, pp. 788–791, Bibcode:1969NaGe..136..788W
Weaver, Kenneth F. (Aug 1970), "Voyage to the Planets", The National Geographic, pp. 147–193
Weaver, Kenneth F. (Apr 1971), "Maui, Where Old Hawaii Still Lives", The National Geographic, pp. 514–543
Weaver, Kenneth F. (Feb 1972), "Apollo 15 Explores the Mountains of the Moon", The National Geographic, pp. 230–265
Weaver, Kenneth F. (Nov 1972), "The Search for Tomorrow's Power", The National Geographic, pp. 650–681
Weaver, Kenneth F. (Feb 1973), "The Search for Life on Mars", The National Geographic, pp. 264–265
Weaver, Kenneth F. (Feb 1973), "Journey to Mars", The National Geographic, pp. 230–263
Weaver, Kenneth F. (Sep 1973), "Have We Solved the Mysteries of the Moon?", The National Geographic, pp. 308–325
Weaver, Kenneth F. (Jan 1974), "How to Catch a Passing Comet", The National Geographic, pp. 148–150
Weaver, Kenneth F. (May 1974), "The Incredible Universe", The National Geographic, pp. 589–625
Weaver, Kenneth F. (Aug 1974), "What You Didn't See in Kohoutek", The National Geographic, pp. 214–223
Weaver, Kenneth F. (June 1975), "Mariner Unveils Venus and Mercury", The National Geographic, vol. 147, pp. 858–869, Bibcode:1975NaGe..147..858W
Weaver, Kenneth F. (Feb 1975), "Mystery Shrouds the Biggest Planet", The National Geographic, pp. 284–294
Weaver, Kenneth F. (Aug 1977), "How Soon Will We Measure In Metric?", The National Geographic, pp. 287–294
Weaver, Kenneth F. (Oct 1977), "Geothermal Energy: The Power of Letting Off Steam", The National Geographic, pp. 566–579
Weaver, Kenneth F. (Feb 1977), "Electronic Voyage Through an Invisible World", The National Geographic, pp. 274–290
Weaver, Kenneth F. (Apr 1979), "The Promise and Peril of Nuclear Energy", The National Geographic, pp. 458–493
Weaver, Kenneth F. (1980), "The New America's Wonderlands: Our National Parks", The National Geographic, pp. 1–464
Weaver, Kenneth F. (June 1980), "Science Seeks to Solve...The Mystery of the Shroud", The National Geographic, pp. 730–753
Weaver, Kenneth F. (February 1981), "Our Energy Predicament: America's Thirst for Imported Oil", The National Geographic, no. Special Report on Energy, pp. 2–23
Weaver, Kenneth F. (Nov 1985), "The Search for Our Ancestors: Stones, Bones, and Early Man", The National Geographic, pp. 560–623
Weaver, Kenneth F. (Sep 1986), "Meteorites--Invaders From Space", The National Geographic, vol. 170, no. 3, pp. 390–418, Bibcode:1986NaGe..170..390B
