= Jonathan Blair =

American photographer

- Born: 1941; Bryn Mawr, Pennsylvania, U.S
- Died: 2017 (aged 75–76)
- Occupation: Photographer

Jonathan Blair (1941-2017) was an American photographer who has worked for the National Geographic Society since 1970s. His photographs have been published in Time, Life and Newsweek, and The New York Times Magazine, as well as in a photographic book called Outlaw Trail, which was an international best seller. His photography is diverse, ranging from underwater shipwrecks, to wildlife on the Pacific Islands to the Wild West in the United States. However, he specialized in natural history and deep ocean photography.

== Biography ==
Blair was born in 1941 in Bryn Mawr, Pennsylvania.

He began his photography career at Northwestern University as a darkroom technician where he took pictures of various stars for Dearborn Observatory. Later, while on a trip to White Sands, New Mexico to help set up an observatory, he realized that it was his passion to become a landscape photographer. After this revelation, he soon enrolled at Rochester Institute of Technology (RIT) to pursue his degree in illustrative photography. One summer, he got a position with the National Park Service of Yosemite National Park and became the park's photographer and later, a park ranger. During his time there, he published many photographs for the United States Department of the Interior which helped him earn credits towards a bachelor's degree in fine arts and photography. It also helped to secure him a position as an intern for the National Geographic magazine. His first assignment for National Geographic was in 1966. He was able to participate in numerous expeditions to Africa, Asia Minor, and Europe.

Since the 1970s, he has published numerous articles with photographs in National Geographic, including The Last Dive of I-52, which he wrote after he took a 17,000 feet (5,200 m) dive in the Atlantic Ocean.

Jonathan died in 2017 at his home in upstate New York after an illness.

== Achievements ==
For the 1984 National Geographic Cover, Blair created a 3D hologram of the African Taung Child, in collaboration with optical scientist Kenneth Haines.

In 2001, he became the Director of Media Development for Nauticos Corporation, an ocean discovery company. His first assignment with them was taking underwater images during their search for Amelia Earhart's airplane.

He collaborated with author Robert Redford, by photographing the illustrations in his book about the badmen of the Wild West. The book, Outlaw Trail, was an international best seller.

One of his pictures, titled "Old man with beard and glasses (Turkey)" is digitally included among the photographs carried onboard Voyager I and Voyager II spacecraft, which are heading out of the Solar System.
