= Georg Gerster =

Swiss journalist and photographer (1928–2019)

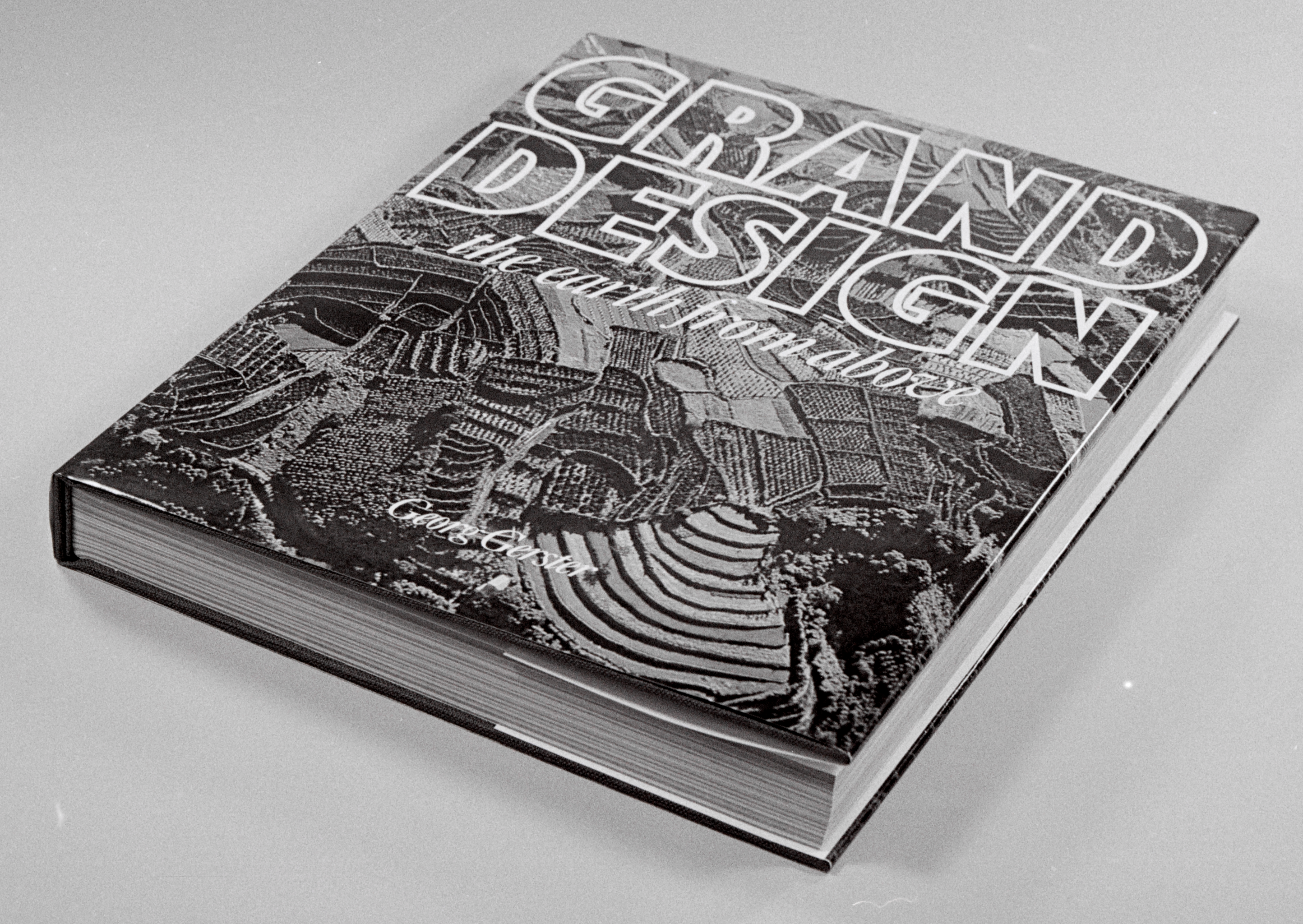
The book "Grand Design, the earth from above" by Georg Gerster

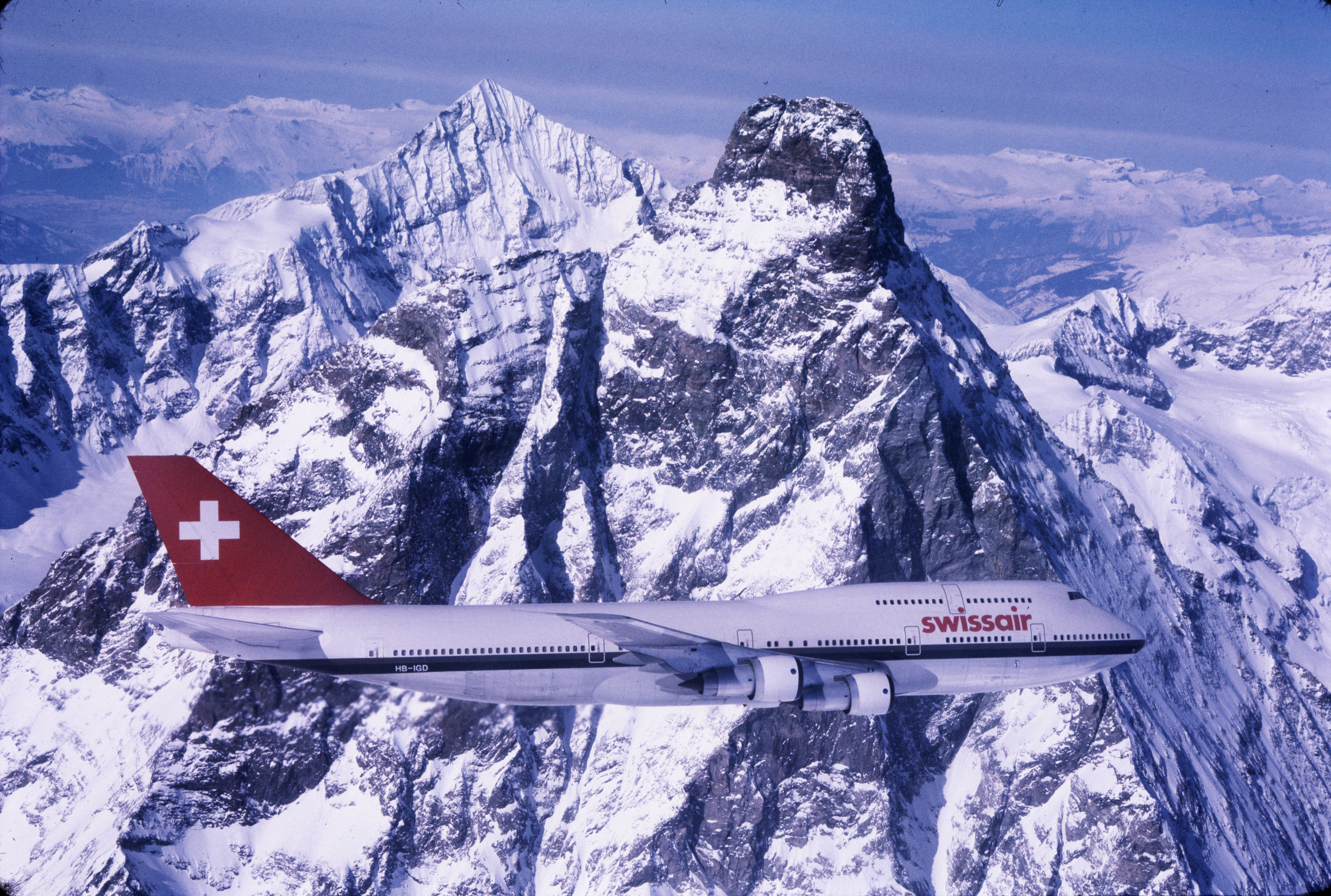
Georg Gerster: Boeing 747-357, HB-IGD "Basel" near the Matterhorn

George Gerster (30 April 1928 – 8 February 2019) was a Swiss journalist and a pioneer aerial photographer.

== Early life ==
Born in Winterthur, in 1950 Gerster earned a doctorate at the University of Zurich in Germanistik. Through 1956 he worked as an editor for the inhabitants of Zurich's "World Week". Since then he was active as a freelance journalist with an emphasis on science reporting and flight photography.

In this photographic field of activity, he did substantial pioneer work in the 1950s and 1960s, respected not only for the technology and quality of his flight pictures, but above all for the universality and internationality of the topics.

Gerster's early photographic reportage and picture volumes detailed landscapes of North Africa. In the sixties, he documented places of archaeological interest in over 100 countries on all continents. In addition, he took breathtaking pictures of mountains and deserts, coasts and lakes, and agrarian and industrial landscapes.

George Gerster was honoured in 1976 with the Prix Nadar. His photos have been shown in single and group exhibitions in Europe, Japan and the USA. He was represented by the Rapho photo agency.

Gerster emphasized, on the one hand, the beauty of the landscape; on the other hand, he points out the endangerment to nature caused by excessive use, erosion, technology and mechanization. The fact that he did not only want to make "beautiful pictures" shows in his expert and precisely investigated captions and book texts.

== Publications ==
- L'art éthiopien, églises rupestres, éditions Zodiaque (1968)
- Der Mensch auf seiner Erde, Zürich: Atlantis Verlag (1975)
- Flights of discovery: The Earth from Above, Paddington Press Ltd. (1978)
- The Past from Above: Aerial Photographs of Archaeological Sites. Los Angeles: Getty Publications, 2005. Pp. 416; ills. 516. ISBN 0-89236-817-9
- The Art of the Maze, with Adrian Fisher, Weidenfeld & Nicolson (1990), ISBN 0-297-83027-9
- Paradise Lost: Persia from Above, Phaidon, 2009 (photos made between 1976 and 1978)

== See also ==
- Yann Arthus-Bertrand
