= Lynch Station, Virginia =

Unincorporated community in Virginia, United States

Coordinates: 37°8′45.6″N 79°18′3.6″W

Lynch Station is an unincorporated community in Campbell County, Virginia, United States. It is situated just north of the town of Altavista, focused around Route 626. Although technically in Campbell County, some areas in the southeastern part of neighboring Bedford County use Lynch Station as their address. Lynch Station's elevation is 705 feet (215 meters).
