= Robert Grosvenor =

Robert Grosvenor may refer to:

- Sir Robert Grosvenor, 6th Baronet (1695–1755), English Member of Parliament
- Robert Grosvenor, 1st Marquess of Westminster (1767–1845), English Member of Parliament
- Robert Grosvenor, 1st Baron Ebury (1801–1893), British courtier and Whig politician
- Robert Grosvenor, 2nd Baron Ebury (1834–1918), British politician
- Robert Grosvenor, 5th Duke of Westminster (1910–1979), British soldier, landowner, businessman and politician
- Robert Grosvenor, 5th Baron Ebury (1914–1957), British politician
- Lord Robert Edward Grosvenor, the fourth son of Hugh Grosvenor, 1st Duke of Westminster
- Robert Grosvenor (aviator) (1895–1953), World War I flying ace
- Robert Grosvenor (artist) (1937–2025), American sculptor
