= Winfield Parks =

Winfield Irving Parks Jr.
- Born: April 24, 1932 Barrington, Rhode Island, US
- Died: August 11, 1977 (aged 45) Washington, DC, US
- Occupation: Photographer

Winfield I. Parks Jr. (April 24, 1932 – August 11, 1977) was an American photographer. His work has been published in National Geographic Magazine and elsewhere. Win's first marriage of 12 years was to Mitzi Harrington of Waterbury, CT. He then married the artist, Sabina Parks. Lastly, Win married Deborah Kenny of Keene, NH.

Winfield I. Parks, Jr., was a staff photographer with the National Geographic Society from 1961 until his death in 1977. He traveled extensively contributing countless stories to the NGS Magazine and NGS books, both photography and writing. His prize-winning, mural-size, black-and-white photograph of the American team in the America's Cup was on display for years in the lobby of The Providence Journal, where he started his career.
