= Howard Sochurek =

American photojournalist

- Portrait, possibly a self-portrait, of Howard Sochurek in Vietnam, 1 January 1955
- Born: Howard James Sochurek; 1924; Milwaukee
- Died: 25 April 1994 (aged 69); Miami, Florida, U.S.
- Occupation: Photographer
- Years active: 1950–1990
- Spouse: Tania Sochurek
- Awards: Robert Capa Gold Medal

Howard James Sochurek (27 November 1924 – 25 April 1994) was an American photojournalist.

== Life and career ==
Howard J. Sochurek was born in 1924 in Milwaukee, Wisconsin. He graduated from Princeton University in 1942 then enlisted on 1 December that year to fight in the Second World War.

On return from war, Sochurek first found work with the Milwaukee Journal, then in 1950 secured a position as staff photographer with Life magazine, going on to work from their New York, Chicago, Detroit, New Delhi, Singapore and Paris offices, and for National Geographic, photographing for stories on the Soviet Union, where in 1959 he covered a visit by Christian Dior fashion models to GUM, the "USSR's premier department store", on the Middle East, on nationalist Chinese 'Boy Battalion' soldiers in Formosa (1951), traveling also to Mongolia (1962) and Vietnam (1953).

At home, he photographed Pulitzer Prize-winning poet Robert Frost in 1957, Richard Nixon's presidential election campaign (1960), Henry Kissinger, and black student activists with Martin Luther King Jr. (1960).

During the Korean War he was parachuted with the 187th Airborne RCT behind enemy lines to photograph American troops, and was sent in 1952 to cover the First Indochina War, documenting the French defeat at Battle of Dien Bien Phu, and subsequently, the Vietnam War.

== Recognition ==
Howard Sochurek (1953) India: Willing hands bring progress. Image included in 'The Family of Man' exhibition and publication.

In 1955 Sochurek was awarded the first Robert Capa Gold Medal. His image India: Willing hands bring progress, showing silhouetted construction workers on scaffolding, was selected by Edward Steichen for MoMA's globally-touring The Family of Man exhibition, and Sochurek also documented the installation of the exhibition for publicity. Sochurek was the first photojournalist to receive the Harvard research sabbatical, the Nieman Fellowship in 1959.

== Contribution to medical imaging ==
Sochurek left Life in 1970 after two decades to work as a freelancer. On assignment for Life, Sochurek had been told to investigate advances in medical imaging. Seeing an opportunity, he secured a computer from NASA that had been used to produce images from the transmissions of spy and weather satellites, becoming one of the first photographers to use computers to image, enhance and colourise X-ray and CT scans. His reputation among medical circles grew, and many doctors and pharmaceutical and other medical companies used his photographs in textbooks and advertisements.

In retirement, Sochurek settled in Boynton Beach, Florida. He died of liver cancer at the age of 69, in April 1994 in Miami at the Jackson Memorial Hospital, survived by his wife Tania and daughter Tania DeChiara.

== Publications ==
- Sochurek, Howard (1988), Medicine's new vision, Mack Pub. Co, ISBN 978-0-912734-25-5
- Sochurek, Howard; De Visser, John, (illus.) (1973), The new Russians, EMC Corp, ISBN 978-0-88436-000-1
- Sochurek, Howard; De Visser, John, (illus.) (1973), Lifelines for the new frontier, EMC Corp, ISBN 978-0-88436-006-3
- Sochurek, Howard; De Visser, John, (illus.) (1973), The first Siberians, EMC Corp, ISBN 978-0-88436-002-5
- Sochurek, Howard; De Visser, John, (illus.) (1973), Siberia at work, EMC Corp, ISBN 978-0-88436-004-9
