= Bruce Dale =

American photographer

Bruce Albert Dale is a former National Geographic photographer, who worked for the publication for 30 years until 1994. During his career with National Geographic, over 2,000 of his images appeared in their publications. His assignments varied from undersea to aerial photography and from people to complex science subjects while working in over 75 countries, including 10 trips to China.

His many awards and honors include being twice named the National Geographic "Magazine Photographer of the Year", "White House Photographer of the Year" in 1989, and more recently, his innovative work with digital imaging brought him honors from the Smithsonian Institution. In addition to many other awards, one of his photographs now journeys beyond the Solar System on board NASA's Voyager spacecraft, as testimony about planet Earth.

Dale left National Geographic to pursue a blend of editorial and corporate and advertising photography. His book, The American Southwest, was published by National Geographic in January 1999.
