= Gilbert Hovey Grosvenor =

American magazine editor (1875–1966)

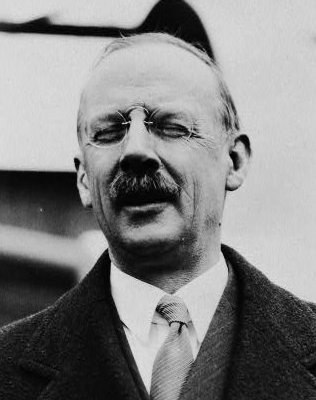
- Grosvenor in 1927

President of the National Geographic Society
- In office 1920–1954
- Preceded by: John E. Pillsbury

Personal details
- Born: October 28, 1875 Constantinople, Ottoman Empire
- Died: February 4, 1966 (aged 90) Cape Breton Island, Nova Scotia, Canada
- Spouse: Elsie May Bell (died 1964)
- Children: 8, including Melville and Mabel
- Parent: Edwin A. Grosvenor (father)
- Relatives: Walter Kendall Myers (grandson)
- Education: Worcester Academy; Amherst College

Gilbert Hovey Grosvenor (/ˈɡroʊvənər/ GROH-vən-ər; October 28, 1875 – February 4, 1966) was an American magazine editor who was the first full-time editor of the National Geographic magazine from 1899 to 1954, and is credited with having consolidated the nascent magazine. As President of the National Geographic Society from 1920 to 1954, he assisted its rise to one of the world's largest and best known science and learning organizations, aided by the chronicling in its magazine of ambitious natural and cultural explorations around the globe.

== Early life ==
Grosvenor was born on October 28, 1875, to Lilian Waters and Edwin A. Grosvenor in Constantinople, Ottoman Empire, (now known as Istanbul, Turkey). He was second cousin to U.S. President and U.S. Supreme Court Justice William Howard Taft.

He was educated at Worcester Academy and at Robert College. He attended Amherst College and graduated with the A.B. degree magna cum laude in 1897. While at Amherst, Grosvenor and his twin brother Edwin were one of the best tennis doubles teams.

== Career ==
=== National Geographic Society ===
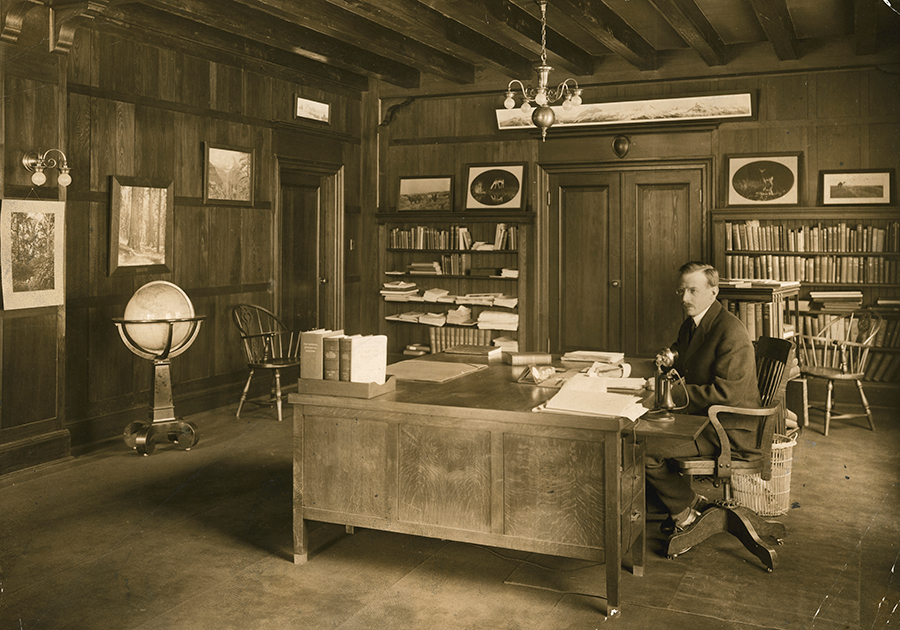
Hovey at work at the National Geographic headquarters in Washington, D.C. (1914)

Grosvenor was hired in 1899 as the first full-time employee of the National Geographic Society by Alexander Graham Bell, the Society's President at the time. He eventually was named Director, and later was elected president of the Society in 1920 after the death of Rear Admiral John E. Pillsbury, and remained editor of National Geographic magazine until 1954.

Grosvenor advocated policies of neutrality and positive, upbeat journalism through two world wars, the Great Depression, and the beginning of the Cold War. This style was seen as innovative in the opening years of the 20th century. However, by the 1950s, Grosvenor's style was criticized as being ossified and dated. He and his staff (most of whom were in their late 60s and 70s) were criticized as being conservative, complacent, and unwilling to modernize, and the National Geographic's subscription base fell as a consequence. After 50 years at the helm, he stepped down in 1954 at the age of 78.

=== Support for the National Park Service ===
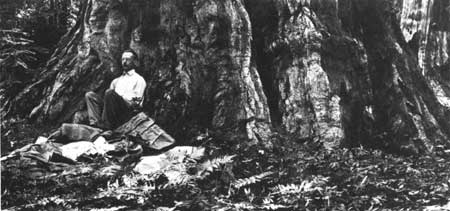
Grosvenor traveled in California with Stephen Mather and helped write the act that created the National Parks.

Grosvenor first traveled to the western United States in 1915 to hike with Stephen Mather in the Sierra Mountains and what is now Sequoia National Park. "Grosvenor was so overwhelmed by the grandeur of the High Sierras and his experience on the trip that he became a revered and long-time friend of Mather and the national parks," according to National Park Service historian Walter Bielenberg. Following his return, Grosvenor provided funding to buy Giant Forest and add it to Sequoia National Park.

For years, opposition in Congress had prevented creation of a national system of parks. In late 1915 and 1916, Grosvenor met with Stephen Mather, Horace Albright, and others to draft the Organic Act, which would create a National Park Service. He then created a special issue of National Geographic (April 1916) entitled "The Land of the Best" to promote the importance of parks and encouraged readers to support creation of a national system. He and Albright made sure that every member of Congress had a copy of the issue. Their efforts worked, and that year legislation finally passed that would establish the National Park Service.

Grosvenor continued involvement with the National Parks over the years. He became very involved in protecting the Katmai volcanic crater and Valley of Ten Thousand Smokes from mining exploitation, and helped to establish Katmai National Monument in 1918. Katmai National Park's Grosvenor Lodge is named after him.

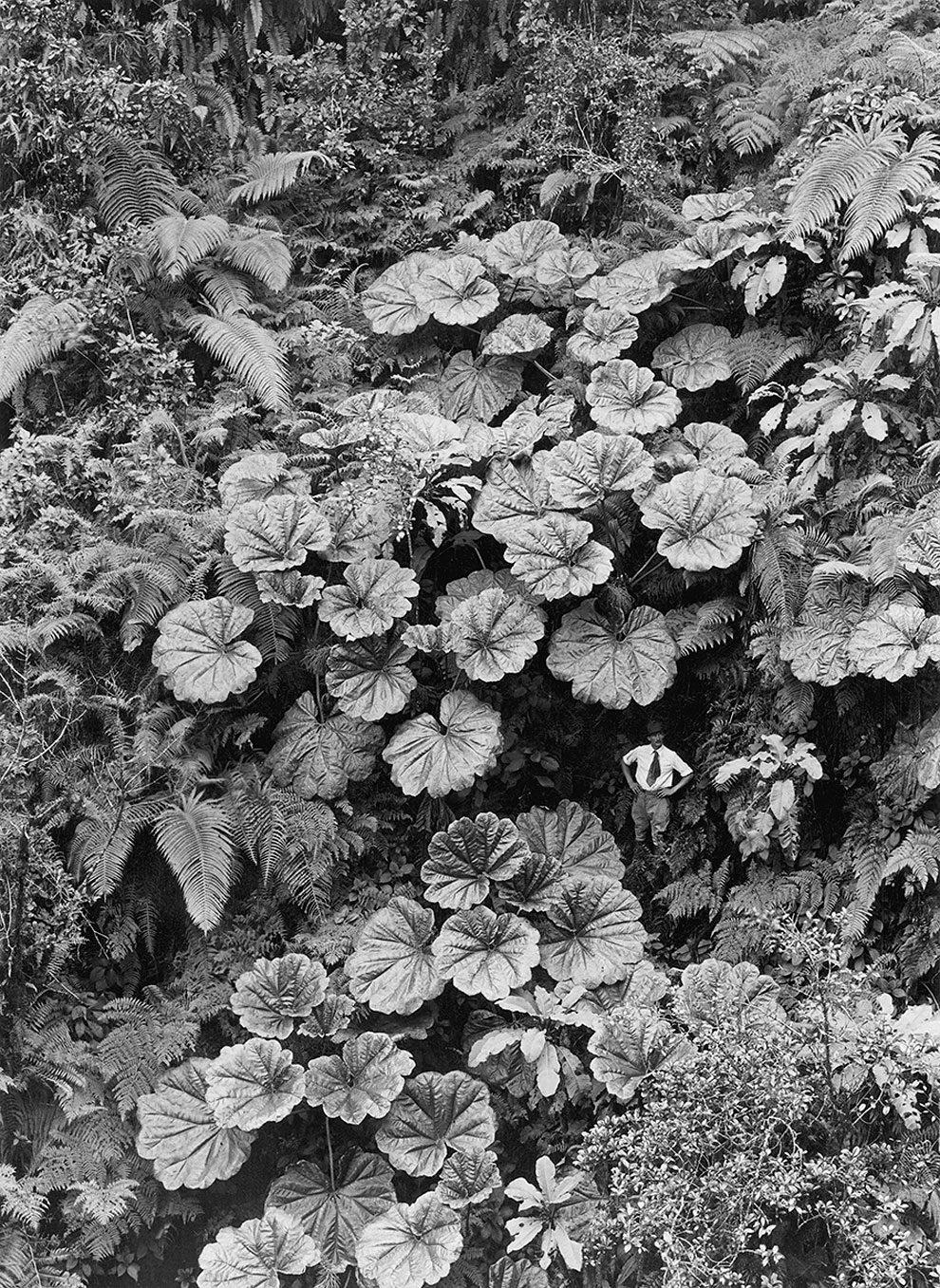
'Ape'ape trees on Maui, with man for scale. Photograph by Grosvenor, 1924

== Personal life ==
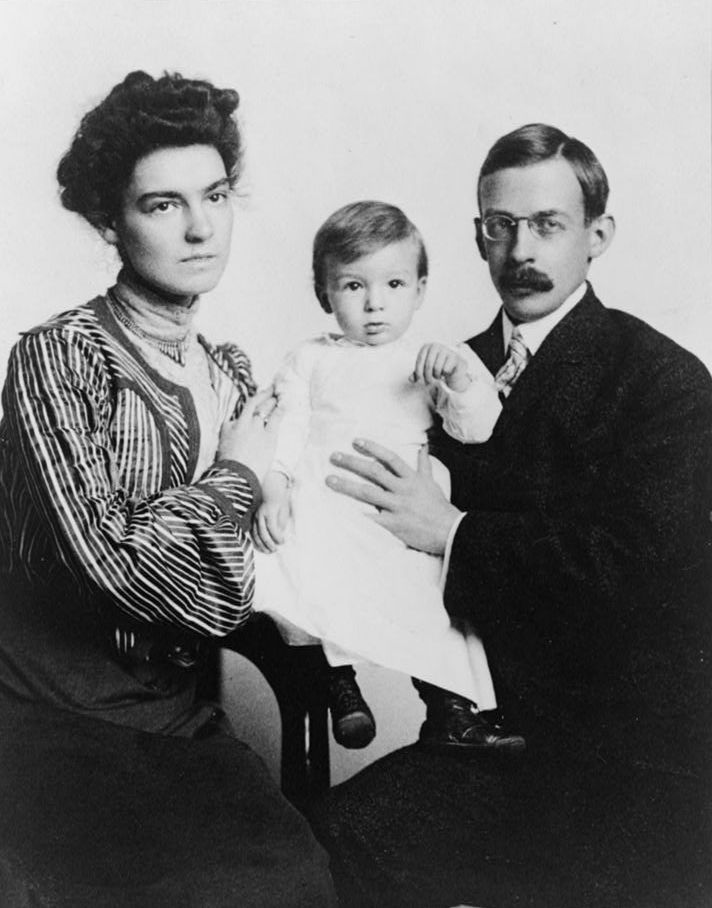
Elsie and Gilbert holding their son, Melville, Library of Congress.

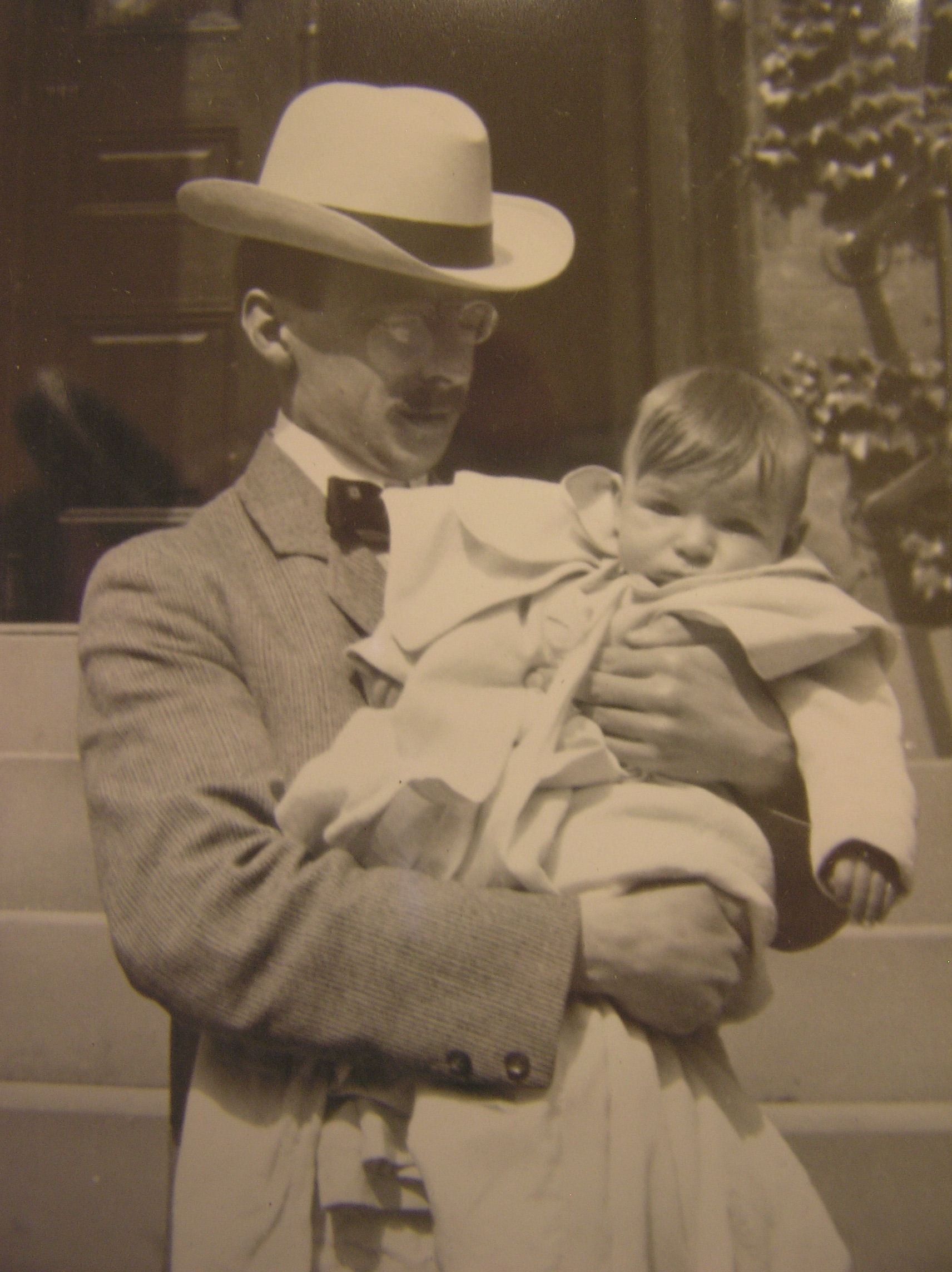
Gilbert Grosvenor holds his young son, Melville Bell Grosvenor, 1902. Library of Congress.

Grosvenor married Elsie May Bell (1878–1964), the daughter of Alexander Graham Bell. Together, they were the parents of seven children, including:

- Melville Bell Grosvenor (1901–1982), also a National Geographic president.
- Gertrude Hubbard Grosvenor (1903–1986), who married Samuel Gayley.
- Mabel Harlakenden Grosvenor (1905–2006), was a pediatrician who, for several years, was secretary to her grandfather Alexander Graham Bell,
- Lilian Waters Grosvenor (1907–1985).
- Alexander Graham Bell Grosvenor (1909–1915), who died young.
- Elsie Alexandra Carolyn Grosvenor (1911–2004).
- Gloria Victoria Grosvenor (1918–1972).

In 1931, Grosvenor bought a property in Coconut Grove, Florida, next door to his brother-in-law, David Fairchild. He called this estate Hissar after the small town in Turkey where he was born. After Fairchild's estate, The Kampong, was acquired by the National Tropical Botanical Garden, they also bought Hissar. Grosvenor served on the board of trustees of the University of Miami from 1944 to 1960.

Grosvenor's health deteriorated following the death of his wife and he died peacefully in his sleep at the age of 90 on February 4, 1966, at the Bell family estate, Beinn Bhreagh, near Baddeck, Nova Scotia, Canada. Grosvenor is buried in Rock Creek Cemetery in Washington, D.C., alongside his wife and members of the Bell family. Grosvenor Arch, a sandstone double arch located in southern Utah, is named after Gilbert Grosvenor.

=== Descendants ===
Through his eldest son Melville, he was the grandfather of Alexander Graham Bell Grosvenor (1927–1978), a United States Navy pilot, Gilbert Melville Grosvenor (b. 1931), also a National Geographic president, and Edwin S. Grosvenor (b. 1951), the editor-in-chief of American Heritage.

Through his daughter Elsie, he was the grandfather of Walter Kendall Myers (b. 1937), a former U.S. State Department employee who, with his wife, Gwendolyn, was arrested and indicted in 2009 on charges of spying for Cuba for nearly 30 years. He was convicted of spying and sentenced to life imprisonment by a U.S. federal court in July 2010. The judge told the couple: "I see no sense of remorse. You were proud of what you did".

=== Legacy ===
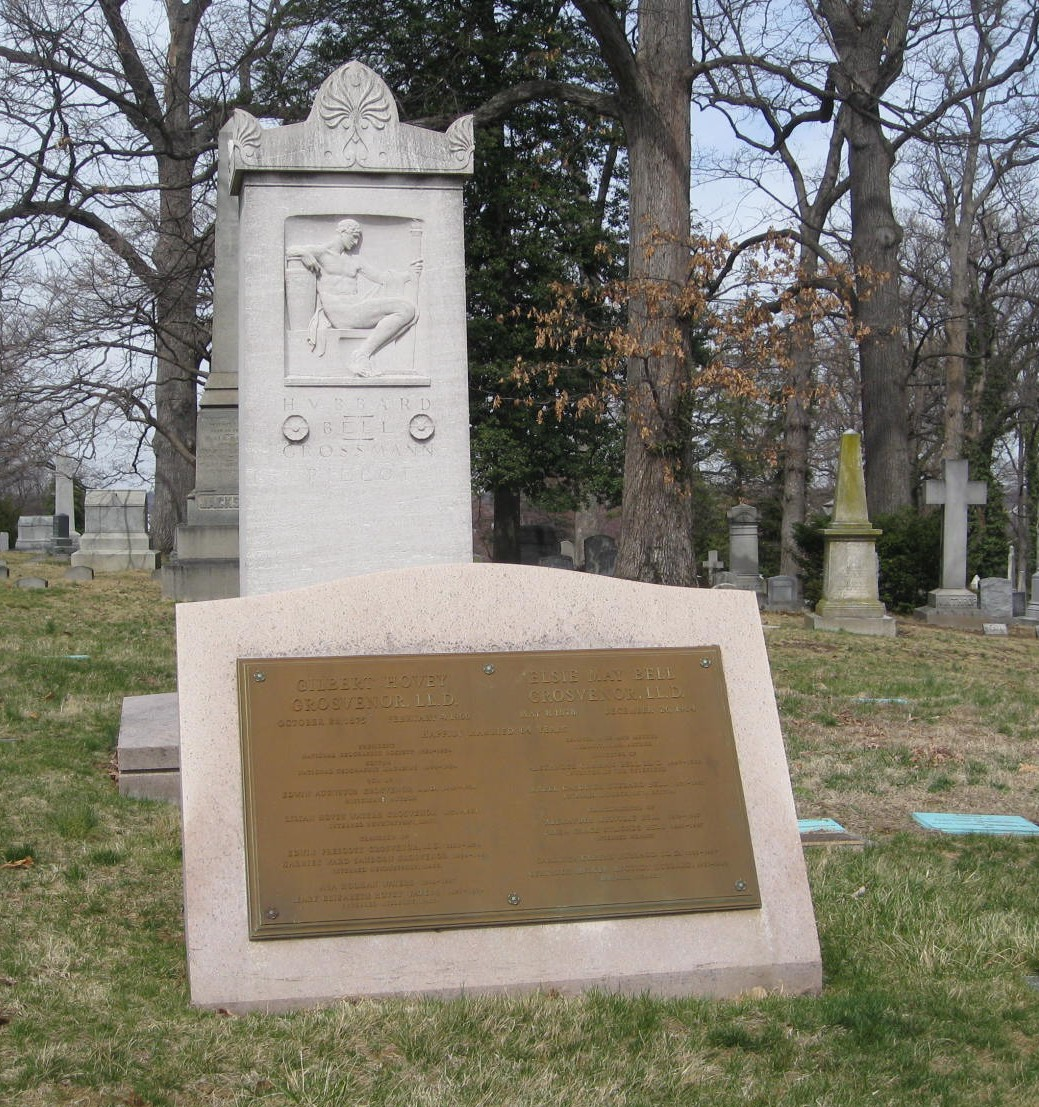
Memorial for Gilbert and Elsie Grosvenor in Rock Creek Cemetery in Washington, D.C.

Grosvenor was one of the founders of the Cruising Club of America.

In the 1950s, Grosvenor's daughter Gertrude Gayley acquired an historic building in Baddeck, Nova Scotia, which she named Gilbert H. Grosvenor Hall in his honour.

His daughter Mabel oversaw the stewardship of Bell's legacy Canadian estate, Beinn Bhreagh, until her death, and was also the Honorary President of the Alexander Graham Bell Club (founded in 1891), Canada's oldest continuing women's club. The club grew out of a social organization started at Beinn Bhreagh, by her grandmother and namesource Mabel Bell.

== See also ==
- Grosvenor (surname) – for the origins of the family
- Monkfruit, or Siraitia grosvenorii, a plant named after Dr Grosvenor who as president of the National Geographic Society helped to fund its scientific study
- Mount Grosvenor, and Mount Grosvenor (Alaska Range), mountains in Alaska named in his honor
