= Melville Bell Grosvenor =

American magazine editor (1901–1982)

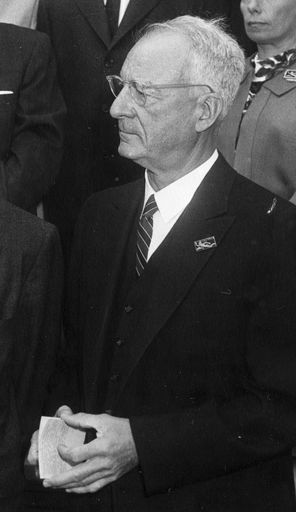
- Grosvenor in 1961
- Born: November 26, 1901; Washington, D.C., U.S.
- Died: April 22, 1982 (aged 80); Miami, Florida, U.S.
- Resting place: Rock Creek Cemetery
- Education: U.S. Naval Academy
- Spouses: Helen Rowland (m. 1924) Anne Revis (after 1950)
- Children: Gilbert Melville Grosvenor; Alexander G.B. Grosvenor; Edwin S. Grosvenor
- Father: Gilbert Hovey Grosvenor
- Relatives: Alexander Graham Bell (grandfather); Mabel Gardiner Hubbard (grandmother)

Melville Bell Grosvenor (November 26, 1901 – April 22, 1982) was an American magazine editor who was the president of the National Geographic Society and editor of The National Geographic Magazine from 1957 to 1967. He was the grandson of telephone inventor Alexander Graham Bell.

A photography enthusiast, he increased the size of printed photographs in the magazine, and initiated the practice, that continues to this day, of opening articles with a two-page photo feature. He reduced the name of the publication from The National Geographic Magazine to National Geographic. Under Grosvenor's tenure, National Geographic also began to branch out from land expeditions to cover investigations into space and the deep sea.

Grosvenor expanded the scope of the society's operations, branching into the production of documentaries bearing the National Geographic name, which began airing on television. Four of these were produced per year. Among the features produced during Grosvenor's presidency were documentaries covering the first American expedition to Mount Everest and Jacques Cousteau's underwater exploits.

== Early life ==
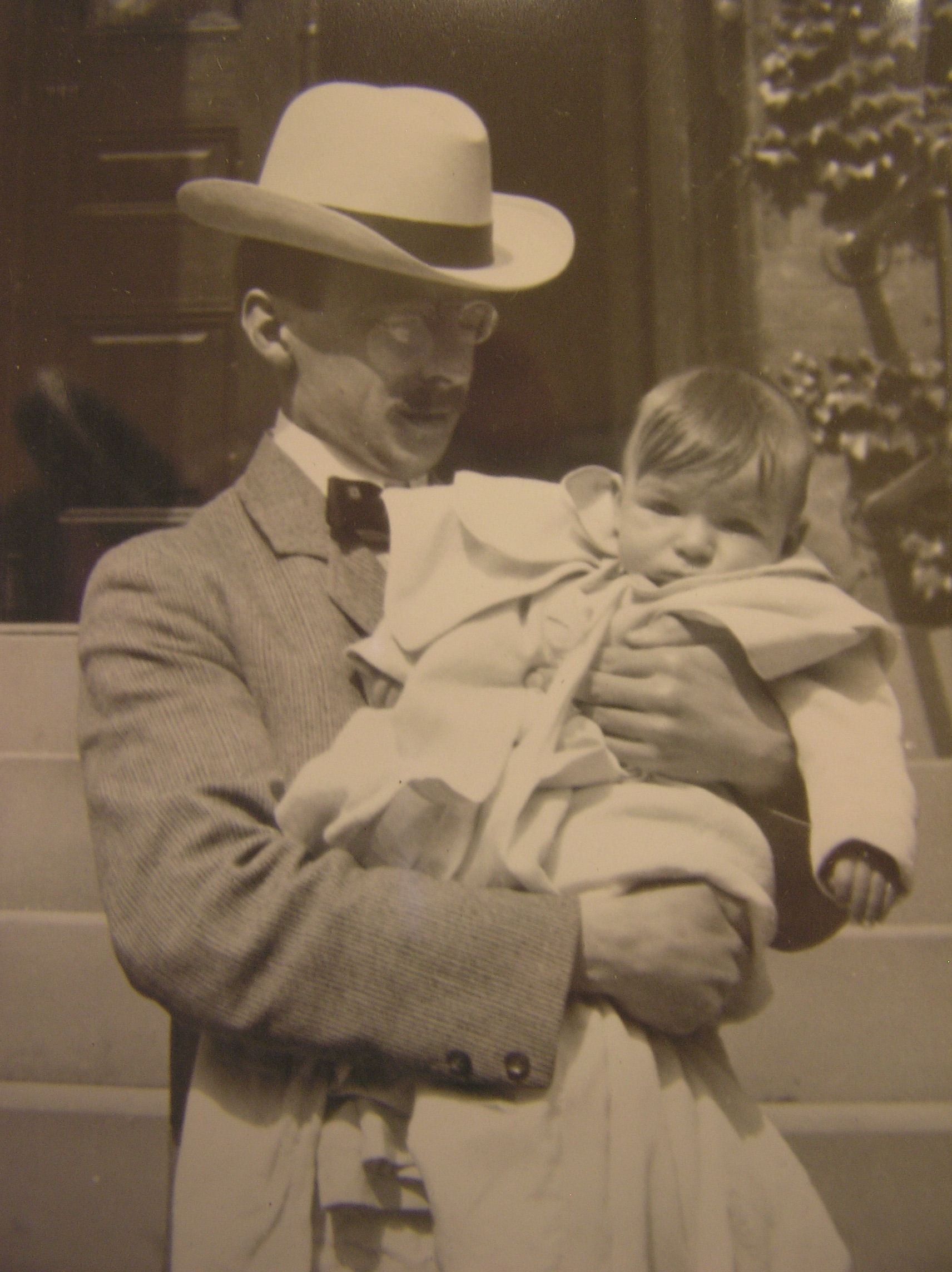
Young Melville Grosvenor is held by his father, Gilbert H. Grosvenor, first Editor of the National Geographic Magazine, 1902.

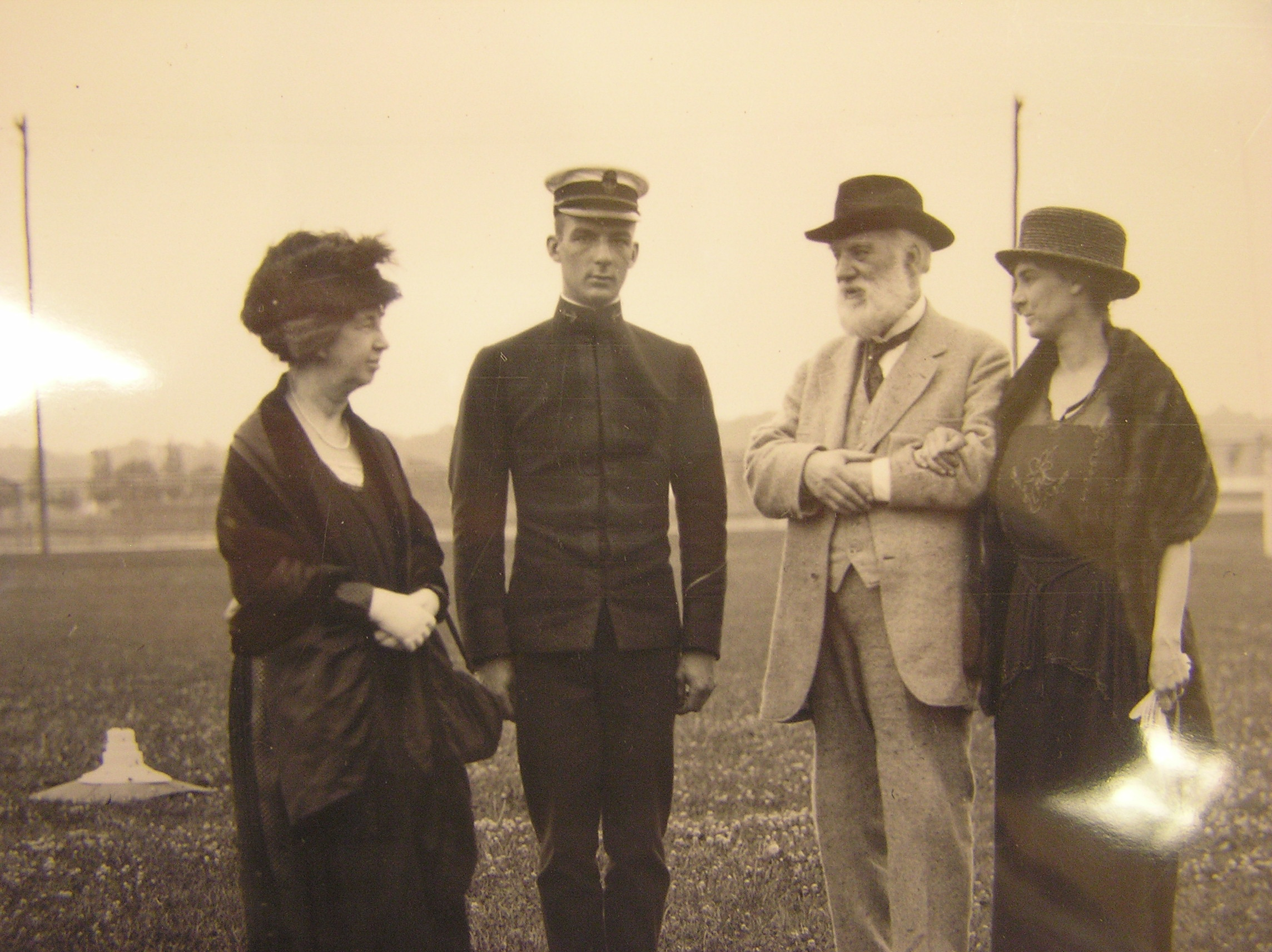
Melville Grosvenor's mother, Elsie May Bell Grosvenor (right), and grandparents, Mabel and Alexander Graham Bell, visit him at the U.S. Naval Academy. Grosvenor was a member of the Class of 1923.

Grosvenor was born in Washington, D.C., on November 26, 1901. His parents were Gilbert Hovey Grosvenor, the first editor of The National Geographic Magazine, and Elsie May (née Bell) Grosvenor, the daughter of Alexander Graham Bell. The year following his birth, he was present at the laying of the cornerstone of the National Geographic Society's first building, Hubbard Hall, while in his grandfather's arms.

In 1919, Grosvenor enrolled in the U.S. Naval Academy. On June 8, 1923, he graduated from the academy with the Class of 1923, which included his lifelong friend, Admiral Arleigh Burke.

== Career ==
After his graduation from the Naval Academy in 1923, Grosvenor was commissioned an ensign in the United States Navy.

In 1924, Grosvenor resigned from the Navy and joined the staff of the National Geographic Society as a picture editor. Grosvenor is credited with taking the first color aerial photograph when he took a shot of the Statue of Liberty by circling the monument in a Navy Airship ZM C2. The photograph was published in the September 1930 issue, leading the Society to adopt the Finlay process, then the newest method for producing color photographs. He also took early aerial color photographs of Washington, D.C., which appeared in the magazine.

=== Accomplishments ===
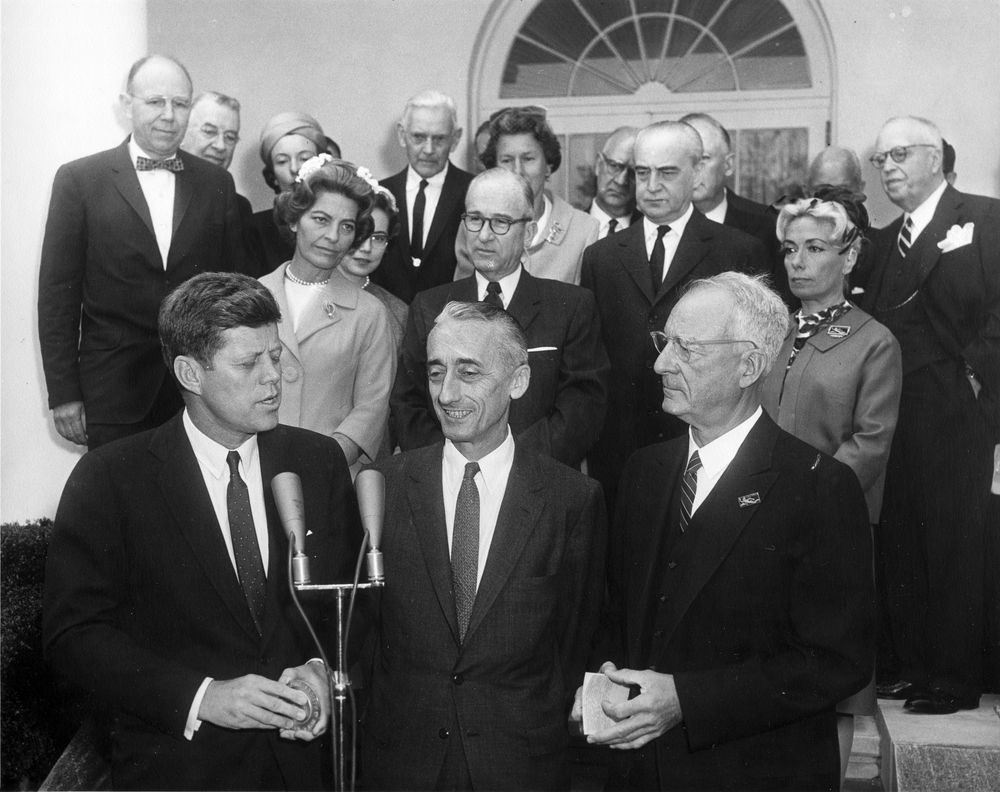
Melville Grosvenor looks on as President Kennedy awards a NGS Gold Medal to Jacques Cousteau, who received one of his first grants from the Society.

After he became President of the Society and Editor of The National Geographic Magazine in 1957, Melville Grosvenor initiated major changes which are credited with resuscitating the organization and increasing membership from 2.1 million to 5.5 million. He added or promoted new editorial staff including Wilbur Garrett and Joseph Judge, and photographers such as Thomas Nebbia and Bruce Dale.

"Under his editorship, the magazine added full-color photographs to its black-white-yellow cover and installed new presses and equipment to enhance its high-quality color picture spreads", commented Robert McFadden about Melville Grosvenor in The New York Times. "Dr. Grosvenor did not dramatically modify the magazine's traditional tone of gentlemanly detachment from the ugliness, misery and strife in the world."

Grosvenor pushed the Society to create new products including television documentaries, books, globes, and its first Atlas of the World, and published articles on exotic African, Asian and South American locations; wildlife, insects, and other natural splendors and anthropological studies on primitive tribal societies. He also commissioned articles on space, polar and undersea research and other subjects.

Grosvenor sharply increased grants for research and exploration. The Society gave one of the first grants to oceanographer Jacques-Yves Cousteau, and supported anthropologists Louis S.B. and Mary Leakey, primatologist Jane Goodall, and other modern pioneers. Grosvenor also campaigned to save the California redwoods before conservation became a popular cause.

Grosvenor oversaw construction of the Society's new headquarters in Washington in 1963, dedicated by President Lyndon B. Johnson.

== Personal life ==
Shortly after he received his commission in the Navy, he married Helen North Rowland (1902–1985) of Washington, D.C., in 1924. Together, they were the parents of:

- Helen Rowland Grosvenor (1925–1988), who was engaged to Robert Barry Dunigan in 1944. In 1947, she was engaged to Robert Clement Watson Jr.
- Alexander Graham Bell Grosvenor (1927–1978), a naval officer Captain who was married to Marcia Braman (1930–2002).
- Gilbert Melville Grosvenor (born 1931), who was editor of National Geographic from 1970 to 1980 before becoming president of the National Geographic Society, which he served until 1996. He was married to Mary Helen Wiley Jarman in 1979.

Grosvenor's second wife, Anne Elizabeth Revis, whom he married in 1950, was a longtime photographer for National Geographic. Together, they were the parents of:

- Edwin S. Grosvenor (born September 17, 1951), who is the President and Editor-in-Chief of American Heritage magazine.
- Sara Grosvenor, president of The Alexander and Mabel Bell Legacy Foundation.

Grosvenor died on April 22, 1982, at his winter home in Miami. He was buried in Rock Creek Cemetery.
