= Gilbert M. Grosvenor =

American editor

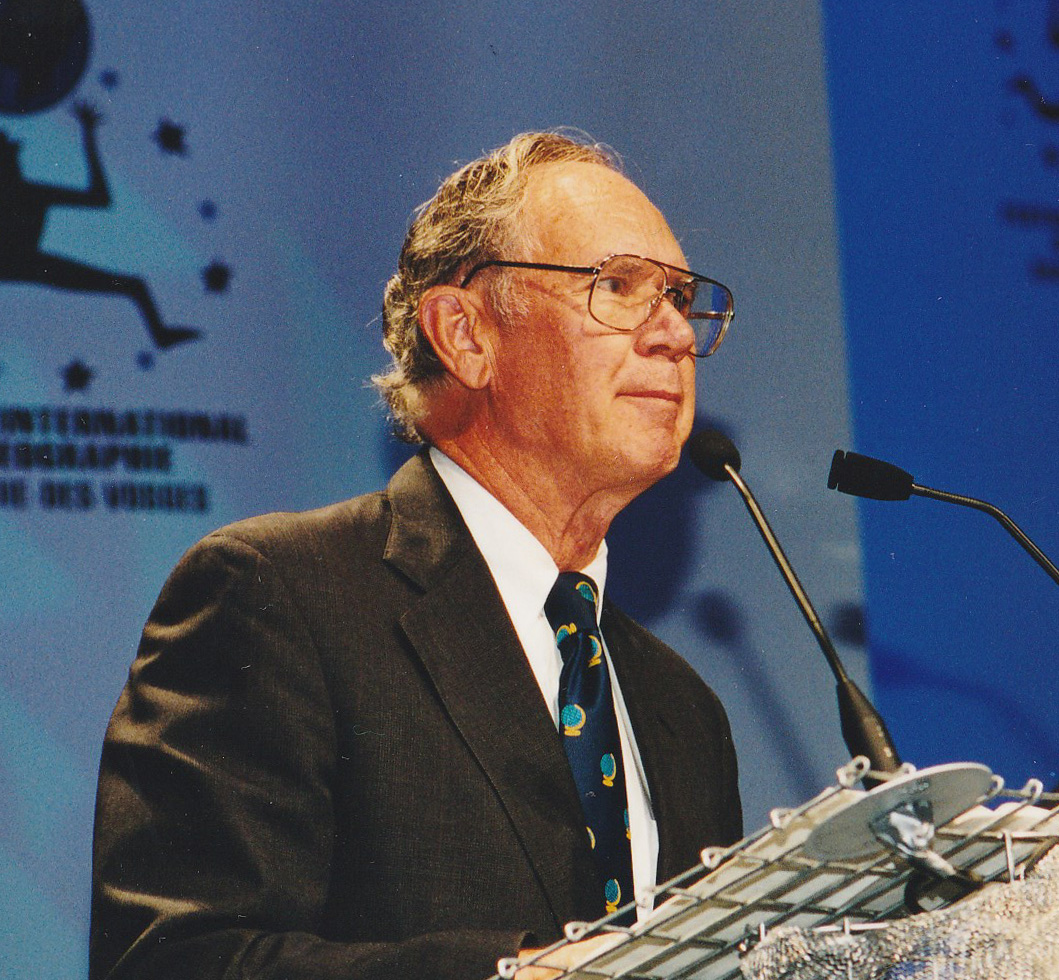
- Gilbert M. Grosvenor, guest of honor at the 1999 International Geography Festival
- Born: May 5, 1931 (age 95); Washington, D.C., U.S.
- Education: Yale College
- Occupations: Chairman Emeritus, National Geographic Society
- Spouse: Donna Kerkam (m. 1961; div. 1977) Mary Helen Wiley Jarman (m. 1979)
- Children: 3
- Parents: Melville Bell Grosvenor; Helen Rowland
- Relatives: Alexander Graham Bell Grosvenor, brother; Edwin S. Grosvenor, brother; Gilbert H. Grosvenor, grandfather; Alexander Graham Bell, great-grandfather
- Awards: Presidential Medal of Freedom (2005)

Gilbert Melville Grosvenor (born May 5, 1931) is the former president and chairman of the National Geographic Society, who previously served as the editor of National Geographic magazine. Now largely retired, Grosvenor and his wife Wiley live in Virginia.

== Biography ==
Born in Washington, D.C., Grosvenor is the son of Melville Bell Grosvenor and the great-grandson of Alexander Graham Bell. He attended Deerfield Academy. He received a B.A. in psychology from Yale University in 1954. Between his junior and senior years, he volunteered in the Netherlands in efforts to recover from the North Sea flood of 1953 and co-authored an article that was published in the National Geographic. "Although I'm not sure I realized it at the time, it changed my life," Grosvenor recently recalled. "I discovered the power of journalism. And that's what we are all about—recording those chronicles of planet Earth." He subsequently joined the staff of the magazine as a picture editor.

In 1970, Grosvenor assumed the position of editor of National Geographic Magazine. He married Mary Jarman in 1979. He served as editor until 1980, when he became president of the National Geographic Society, additionally becoming chairman of the board of trustees (on which he served from 1966 to 2014) in 1987. He retired as president in 1996 and chairman in 2011, since which time he has served as an honorary director of The Explorers Club.

In 1996, Grosvenor was awarded a gold medal by the Royal Canadian Geographical Society and the Scottish Geographical Medal by the Royal Scottish Geographical Society.

In 1996, Grosvenor received the Golden Plate Award of the American Academy of Achievement presented by Awards Council member Sylvia Earle.

Grosvenor was awarded the Presidential Medal of Freedom, the highest civilian honor in the United States, by President George W. Bush on June 23, 2004.

== Writings ==
- "The Water Crisis," Huffington Post
- "Bali of the Back Roads," National Geographic Magazine, November, 1969.

Non-profit organization positions
Preceded by Robert E. Doyle	President of the National Geographic Society; March 1980 – 1996	Succeeded by J. Reginald Murphy
