= If It Ain't Got That Swing =

2000 non-fiction book by Mark Gauvreau Judge

- Author: Mark Gauvreau Judge
- Subject: Swing music
- Genre: American culture
- Published: 2000
- Publisher: Spence Publishing Company
- Publication place: United States
- Media type: Hardcover
- Pages: 128
- ISBN: 978-1890626242
- OCLC: 43728944
- LC Class: 00-26706
- Preceded by: Wasted: Tales of a GenX Drunk (1997)
- Followed by: Damn Senators (2003)

If It Ain't Got That Swing: The Rebirth of Grown-Up Culture is a 2000 non-fiction book about swing music and changes in American culture, written by Mark Gauvreau Judge. Judge had previously written a memoir about his alcoholism titled Wasted: Tales of a GenX Drunk. If It Ain't Got That Swing chronicles the author's experimentation with swing dancing lessons, and his reluctance to do so due to his prior usage of alcohol as a way to relax himself in large social situations.

Judge ascribes the 1996 film Swingers and a 1998 Gap Inc. commercial with youths dancing to the Lindy Hop as evidentiary of the swing revival. Judge criticizes the American culture of the 1960s and rock and roll, as forms of adolescence society in the United States. The book documents the author's shift from liberalism to support of right-wing politics.

If It Ain't Got That Swing received negative book reviews from Library Journal, Kirkus Reviews, The Wall Street Journal, and Reason. Library Journal criticized the book's writing style and called it a "sophomoric, opinionated diatribe". Kirkus Reviews called it a "diatribe" and wrote that it failed due to "single-mindedness and humorlessness". The Wall Street Journal called Judge's argumentation "persuasive" but "incomplete", and pointed out inconsistencies in the book. Writing for Reason, Jesse Walker also found factual errors in Judge's work.

== Contents summary ==
If It Ain't Got That Swing chronicles the author's transition from support of liberalism towards right-wing politics. Judge says he was influenced by the writings of Christopher Lasch, especially his work The Culture of Narcissism. The author's shift from left-wing politics to conservatism was additionally motivated by his initial foray into swing dancing. Judge examines the contemporary period of swing revival.

The author recounts what he views as a subculture appreciative of rock and roll within American society which is devoid of any real meaning. Judge argues that this rock and roll culture is representative of an adolescent mentality. He criticizes changes which took place in the United States during the 1960s and praises cotillions as a way to return to an earlier period within American society.

Judge writes that he himself took up swing dancing in the locality of Washington, D.C. in 1995. He describes for the reader the nervousness he felt while entering his first swing dance lesson, because he had previously relied upon alcoholic beverages as a way to make himself feel more comfortable in public gatherings. He charts the swing revival to two factors: the 1996 film Swingers, and a 1998 advertisement with youths performing the Lindy Hop while promoting Gap Inc. clothing.

Judge pines for a culture in the United States reminiscent of more conservative ideology. Judge cites the adultery of Bill Clinton as evidence of a breakdown in social values. He criticizes feminism and instead embraces a culture of chivalry. The author puts forth an argument that liberalism is hypocritical. Judge asserts that culture within the United States lacks organization, freedom, and connectedness. He argues that these qualities can be found in swing revival.

== Composition and publication ==
Prior to writing If It Ain't Got That Swing, Judge had worked as a journalist in his early twenties. Before publishing If It Ain't Got That Swing, Judge had written Wasted: Tales of a GenX Drunk (1997). If It Ain't Got That Swing was first published in hardcover format in 2000, by Spence Publishing Company. An eBook was published by the same publisher in the same year. The author was interviewed on the NPR program Talk of the Nation in August 2000 about his book, and said that the 1996 film Swingers represented a resurgence of swing culture in the United States. By February 2001, Judge's book had become a bestseller in the United States. Judge subsequently published other books including Damn Senators, God and Man at Georgetown Prep (2005), and A Tremor of Bliss: Sex, Catholicism, and Rock 'n' Roll (2010).

== Critical reception ==
If It Ain't Got That Swing received a negative book review from Library Journal, which observed the author advocated a society in the United States represented by Leave It to Beaver. The book review described the author's writing style as "meandering pages". The review concluded, "Displaying little knowledge or understanding of past or current American culture, Judge presents a sophomoric, opinionated diatribe that offers little to any reader."

Kirkus Reviews published a critical book review of If It Ain't Got That Swing, commenting that the author's writing style "has a tone of moral penitence and self-righteousness." Kirkus Reviews concluded, "In the end, his diatribe comes to resemble a rant." The book review characterized Judge's work as, "Ambitious pop-cult criticism that fails because of its single-mindedness and humorlessness."

Judge's work garnered a book review from The Wall Street Journal, which wrote of the author's argument that swing dancing could improve American culture: "There is much that is persuasive in this argument, but it is incomplete." The review pointed out factual errors in Judge's writing, such as that dancing in public was curtailed after a U.S. tax on nightclubs in 1944. The Wall Street Journal pointed out that Judge's view of swing dancing as a way to improve civil discourse in American culture, led him to falsely conflate early swing dancing with a completely different later period of swing dancing culture. The Washington Post recommended the book, and classed it among others on the topic including Dance of Days, Our Band Could Be Your Life, and D.C. Hand Dance.

Jesse Walker reviewed If It Ain't Got That Swing for Reason. Walker wrote that Judge "gets the genealogy of neo-swing wrong, and that he does so precisely because he's trying to reduce a complex phenomenon to a simple explanation." Walker criticized Judge's "distorted chronology" about the evolution of the swing revival, citing factual inaccuracies in the presentation of swing dance history in the book. He said that the swing revival "obviously predated" the Gap Inc. commercial. He argued that Judge wrote from a stance of narcissism. The Reason book review concluded, "His new book's subtitle may invoke 'grown-up culture,' but his prose betrays him: He writes like he's going through a stage."
