= A Tremor of Bliss =

2010 non-fiction book by Mark Judge

A Tremor of Bliss: Sex, Catholicism, and Rock 'n' Roll
- Author: Mark Judge
- Original title: A Tremor of Bliss: Sex, Catholicism, and Rock 'n' Roll
- Working title: A Tremor of Bliss: Sex and the American Catholic Church
- Subject: American culture
- Genre: Religion
- Publisher: Doubleday Religion
- Publication date: 2010
- Publication place: United States
- Media type: Paperback
- Pages: 192
- ISBN: 978-0385519205
- OCLC: 262430744
- Preceded by: God and Man at Georgetown Prep (2005)

A Tremor of Bliss: Sex, Catholicism, and Rock 'n' Roll is a non-fiction book about sexual morality, Catholicism and religion in the United States written by Mark Judge. Prior to research on the work, Judge's background in Catholicism included education at Catholic schools Georgetown Preparatory School and Catholic University of America. Judge's previous books, including Wasted: Tales of a GenX Drunk and God and Man at Georgetown Prep chronicled his time at Catholic school.

In A Tremor of Bliss Judge argues that the sexual revolution in 1960s United States resulted in a decline in American values which previously had been rooted in Christian theology. He criticizes abortion, birth control, pornography, and sexual liberation. Judge advocates a return to a religious morality to combat what he views as evils in society and inappropriate attitudes towards sexuality in the U.S.

Judge's work received reviews in The Washington Times and First Things. Writing for The Washington Times, Jeremy Lott observed that A Tremor of Bliss served as a form of confessional about the author's personal life. First Things called the book, "An insightful history of the rise of contraception in the last century".

== Contents summary ==
A Tremor of Bliss recounts the author's experiences in Catholic school during the 1970s and 1980s. In particular, he describes his time at Georgetown Preparatory School during his secondary education and how they approached sex education. Judge writes that his sex education teacher, Bernie Ward, went on to move to San Francisco and lead a talk show focusing on left-wing politics. noting that "Ward would also be arrested and convicted for sending pornographic images of children over the Internet." Judge recalls that in the initial lecture about sex education Ward gave an assignment to read about feminism and sexual activity written by Betty Friedan. Judge criticized Ward for de-emphasizing virtuous religious values and embracing liberal ideas about sex and women's bodies.

Judge argues that liberalism has encouraged a society embracing pornography, which he says is a danger to American culture. Judge cites his own Catholic school background to discuss the broader topic of sex education and its impact on him as a youth. He criticizes American sexual mores including hookup culture, abortion, and the sexual revolution in the United States. and criticizes baby boomers, an age group to which he belongs. Judge examines why, in his view, the sexual revolution in 1960s United States led to a decline in American values and an exodus from religious conservatism. He cites lyrics from contemporary rock and roll music to argue his point about the decrease in virtues in American society. Judge discusses the impact of musicians, including Louis Armstrong and Justin Timberlake, on American society.

A Tremor of Bliss presents a chronology of birth control in the United States. He discusses the leadership roles in the birth control movement of Margaret Sanger, and sexual attitude changes in American society as furthered by the research of Alfred Kinsey. The author discusses the encyclical Humanae vitae written by Pope Paul VI and its attempts to argue a return to traditional Catholic values regarding sexuality. Judge recounts the history of moral theologian Charles Curran. Pope John Paul II is featured in a hagiographic fashion as a protagonist of the book. Judge recounts Theology of the Body by John Paul II, and argues that it is a model for how Catholic teachings can be incorporated into American societal views on sex. Judge also extols the views of some other Christian theological writers including Hans Urs von Balthasar and Dietrich von Hildebrand. Judge heavily criticizes the views of Catholic commentators Andrew Sullivan and E.J. Dionne. Judge subsequently states that he supports same-sex marriage in the United States.

The author recounts intimate details from his own sexual history to illustrate his points in A Tremor of Bliss. He states that he engaged in frequent sexual activity, and describes a girlfriend whom he refers to as Ellen, and relates how Ellen discovered she was pregnant by the author, and had an abortion without first informing him. Judge discusses the impact of this on him. At first he says the impact was minimal, due to his liberal sex education as taught by Ward at Georgetown Preparatory School. This informed him that condom use was encouraged, and that the anti-abortion movements was akin to a form of fascism. He recounts that he cried when he heard about the abortion. He describes her choice as a disaster and a catastrophe tied to his narcissism and his sexual liberalism.

A Tremor of Bliss argues for a counterrevolution rooted in Catholic beliefs to serve as a counter to the original sexual revolution in the United States. Judge criticizes what he views as a liberal attitude towards sexuality in the United States, and believes Catholic education can serve as a counter-balance to these.

== Composition and publication ==
Prior to writing A Tremor of Bliss, Judge had worked as a journalist in his early twenties. He was a freelance writer in 1989 in the Washington, D.C. area. Judge received his Bachelor of Arts degree from Catholic University of America in 1990. By 1990 he had become a contributor to The Progressive, In These Times and Sojourners. Judge briefly taught at Georgetown University but left in the 1990s. Before publishing A Tremor of Bliss, Judge's previously published books included: Wasted: Tales of a GenX Drunk, If It Ain't Got That Swing, Damn Senators, and God and Man at Georgetown Prep.

By August 2008, Judge had contracted with Doubleday with plans to publish A Tremor of Bliss in 2009, under the planned title of A Tremor of Bliss: Sex and the American Catholic Church. A Tremor of Bliss was first released in a print format, in hardcover edition, in 2010. An eBook edition was released the same year. Judge led a discussion forum in 2010 on themes in A Tremor of Bliss, at the Catholic Information Center in Washington, D.C. By September 2010, A Tremor of Bliss had reached the "Catholic Bestsellers" printed in Publishers Weekly.

== Critical reception ==
A Tremor of Bliss received a review from Jeremy Lott in The Washington Times, who said "Some authors try to separate themselves from their arguments. Mr. Judge's books tend toward the confessional." Lott's review concluded, "Judge proposes a Catholic sexual counterrevolution, though he doesn't want to call it that. What he clearly does want is U.S. Catholic education to play a vital role in countering the current almost-anything-goes culture."

First Things contributor Matthew Kenefick wrote in his review of A Tremor of Bliss, "An insightful history of the rise of contraception in the last century provides the most valuable material in A Tremor of Bliss." Kenefick recommended the book, concluding, "A Tremor of Bliss is a book well worth reading from an author unafraid of showing some 'attitude.'"
