= Race to Incarcerate: A Graphic Retelling =

Graphic novel by Marc Maurer and Sabrina Jones

Race to Incarcerate: A Graphic Retelling is a graphic novel published by The New Press and illustrated by Sabrina Jones.

== Background ==
The graphic novel was published by nonprofit publisher The New Press. The book focuses on the increasing incarceration rates in the United States noting that in the 1970s there were only 250,000 incarcerated, whereas by the 2010s there are more than 2.3 million. The graphic novel does not contain the citations you might expect in an academic work. Jones visited prisons and spoke to inmates there as part of her research for the graphic novel.

The foreword is written by Michelle Alexander. The preface is written by Mark Mauer.

The book that the graphic novel was based on was written by Mark Mauer and published in 1999. The book was on the Washington Post bestseller list for two months.

== Reception ==
Martha Cornog praised the book in LibraryJournal, saying that the "black-and-white visuals from Jones add clarity and vividness to complex issues." In Shelf Awareness, Nancy Powell declared that "Jones's gritty illustrations punctuate Mauer's main points." Similarly, Jesse Walker wrote in Reason that "Jones' grim yet lively art accentuates every argument."
