= Damn Senators =

2003 book by Mark Gauvreau Judge

- Damn Senators
- Author: Mark Gauvreau Judge
- Subject: Major League Baseball
- Genre: Biography
- Published: 2003
- Publisher: Encounter Books
- Publication place: United States
- Media type: Hardcover
- Pages: 160
- ISBN: 978-1893554702
- OCLC: 51615233
- Preceded by: If It Ain't Got That Swing (2000)
- Followed by: God and Man at Georgetown Prep (2005)

Damn Senators: My Grandfather and the Story of Washington's Only World Series Championship is a biography by author Mark Gauvreau Judge about his grandfather, Major League Baseball player Joe Judge, and the Washington Senators. The book focuses on baseball players Judge and Walter Johnson, detailing how they took the Washington Senators to win the 1924 World Series.

The book cites baseball statistics to argue that Judge was on a par with the skills of Mickey Mantle, and argues he should be included in the Baseball Hall of Fame.

Damn Senators received a positive reception from multiple publications.

== Contents summary ==
Damn Senators chronicles the Major League Baseball career of Joe Judge, grandfather of author Mark Gauvreau Judge. Judge played in the position of first baseman for the Washington Senators. He was with the team from 1915 through 1932. The author discusses how the baseball player was the inspiration for the character Joe from the novel by Douglass Wallop that was adapted into the play Damn Yankees. The title of the book is a reference to Damn Yankees.

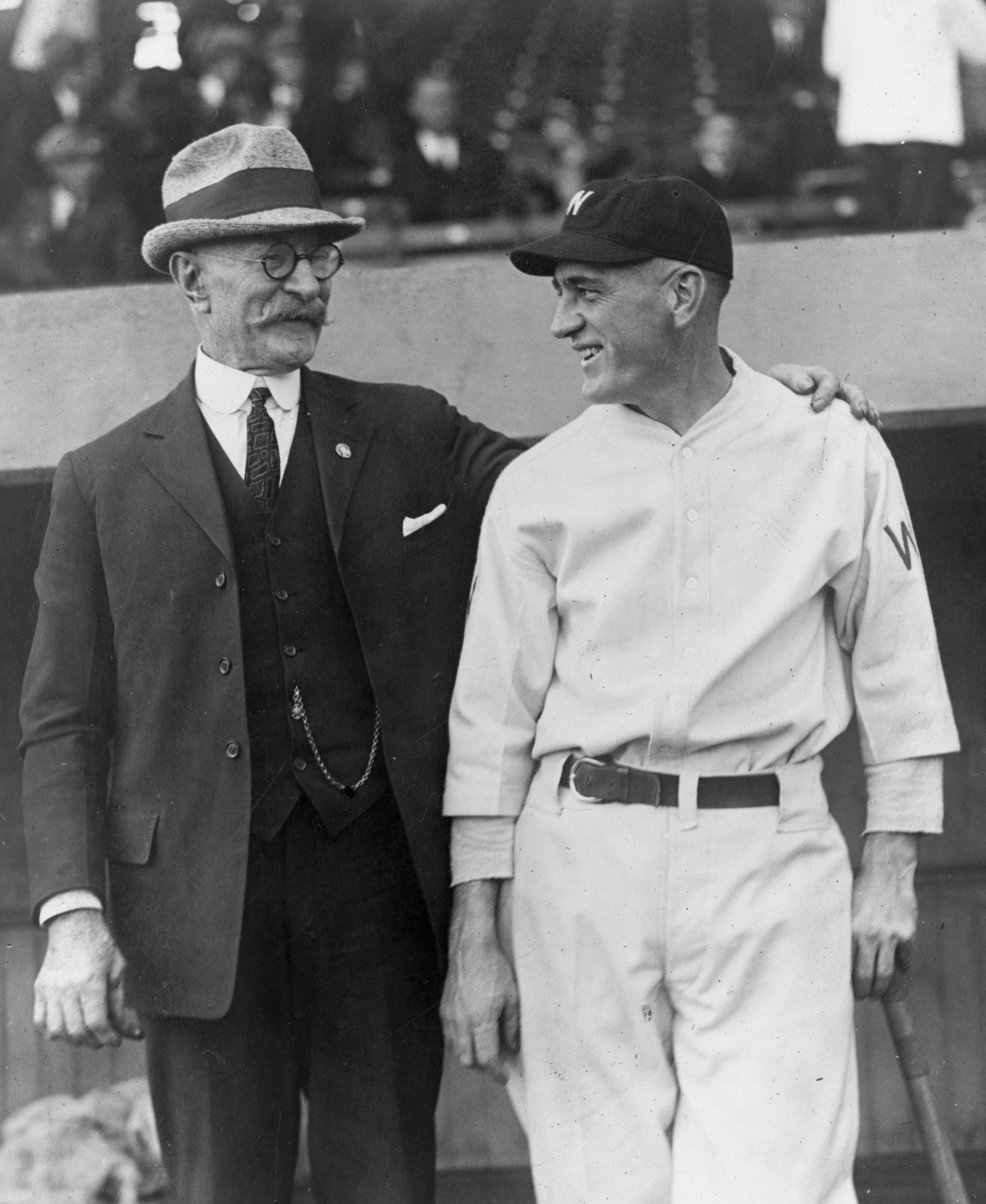
Joe Judge and his father at the 1924 World Series

During his era, Judge was regarded as among both the top players for his position as first baseman, and also as a fielder. Judge had among the best fielding average in Major League Baseball. His batting average over a twenty-year career was .298, exactly the same numeric garnered by Mickey Mantle over his career of 18 years. The author cites these baseball statistics to argue that Judge should be included in the Baseball Hall of Fame.

Walter Johnson is described in the book as an excellent baseball pitcher from Idaho who was respected for his genuine and good-natured qualities both on and off the baseball field. The author recounts the baseball pitcher's August 7, 1907 first game with the Washington Senators. They were matched by the Detroit Tigers, who claimed player Ty Cobb. Johnson was able to disguise his pitches so they appeared initially to be slower, when in actuality they surprised batters with their speed. The Detroit Tigers were impressed by Johnson's pitching skills in his first game as a rookie baseball pitcher.

Cobb is described in the work as utilizing a tactic to injure other baseball players during the game. Cobb maintained a strategy of sharpening the cleats on his shoes and then sliding into bases at an angle such as to hurt the players on the opposing team. Prior to a match with the Washington Senators, Cobb is depicted in the book as marching over to their baseball dugout and prominently sharpening his cleats in front of the opposing players. The author writes that Judge noticed this provocation, and threatened Cobb with a baseball bat and a potential trip to the hospital, leading Cobb to cease his behavior.

Damn Senators details the successful 1924 World Series win by the Washington Senators, assisted by Judge and Johnson. Earlier in the season, in September, President of the United States Calvin Coolidge had invited the Washington Senators to the White House and instructed them he hoped to be a spectator at the World Series in Washington, D.C. During the season the team would go on to beat Babe Ruth with the New York Yankees. The author recounts for the reader key moments in the World Series held at Griffith Stadium. Both the first and last games of the series lasted 12 innings long. The author describes Johnson's role helping to win the game during the seventh game of the series, in the 12th inning of the game. Bucky Harris played for the Washington Senators and made his solitary home run in his professional baseball experience. This home run caused the spectators to stand and cheer, including President Coolidge. The game was won by the Washington Senators against the New York Giants.

After their defeat, the New York Giants were respectful to their opposing players. One player for the New York Giants remarked that divine intervention helped Johnson win the game, due to his reputation for kindness towards others. Johnson and Cobb would later go on to develop a friendship.

== Composition and publication ==
Prior to writing Damn Senators, Judge had worked as a journalist in his early twenties. He was a freelance writer in 1989 in the Washington, D.C. area. Judge received his bachelor of arts degree from Catholic University of America in 1990. By 1990 he had become a contributor to The Progressive, In These Times and Sojourners. Judge briefly taught at Georgetown University but left in the 1990s. Before publishing Damn Senators, Judge had written prior books including: Wasted: Tales of a GenX Drunk (1997), and If It Ain't Got That Swing (2000). Judge's grandfather and the inspiration for Damn Senators died in 1963, the year prior to the author's birth. Judge recalls in a piece for The New York Times, being pleasantly surprised by the positive reaction by attendees at Robert F. Kennedy Stadium when his grandfather was added to the Hall of Stars for Washington, D.C. sportspeople on October 21, 1990. Damn Senators was first published in hardcover format in 2003. It was released in an eBook format the same year. The book was subsequently published in a paperback edition in 2004. An eBook was released for that edition as well. Judge subsequently published other books including God and Man at Georgetown Prep (2005), and A Tremor of Bliss: Sex, Catholicism, and Rock 'n' Roll (2010).

== Critical reception ==
The Wall Street Journal wrote that Judge "so nicely captured" the "glory of Washington baseball" in Damn Senators. The Boston Globe journalist Michael Kranish was interviewed on Weekend Edition for NPR in 2004, and highlighted Judge's book Damn Senators among his favorite summer reading picks. He commented about his favorite portion of Judge's book, "My favorite part of Damn Senators was learning who Joe Judge was". Kranish explained further, "He's before my time but it gave me a peek into baseball and that time. I love to read a book that puts you in a time and place and this certainly did that."

The Boston Herald recommended the work among other similar sports-themed monographs to place on a "baseball bookshelf". The newspaper called it, "A slim but satisfying memoir of the author's grandfather, long-ago Washington Senators first baseman Joe Judge." The Weekly Standard wrote of the author's description of 1924: "Mark Gauvreau Judge, has beautifully captured the excitement and intensity of that season in Damn Senators." Human Events wrote of the book, "Any book that re-creates the glory days of the Washington Senators (there were so few), salutes the greatness of Walter Johnson and tells the overlooked story of the author's grandfather, first baseman Joe Judge, is worth writing about. In Damn Senators, Mark Gauvreau Judge accomplishes all three."

A book review in April 2003 in The Washington Times wrote, "Judge does a nice job recapturing the excitement of the World Series". The book review criticized Judge's work for poor research leading to a few minor inaccuracies. The review concluded, "This thin volume may be of some interest to historians studying the formerly woebegone Washington Senators drive to the franchise's only World Series championship in 1924." A subsequent book review in November 2003 by The Washington Times called it an "evocative" work. The second book review by The Washington Times wrote, "Judge has an interesting story to tell, one he learned from his father, who presumably had it from his father, Joe Judge. It's not in any standard Cobb biography." The book review commented of Judge's writing style, "Judge's main account, the 1924 World Series, is one of baseball's great stories."
