= Joe Judge (baseball) =

American baseball player (1894–1963)

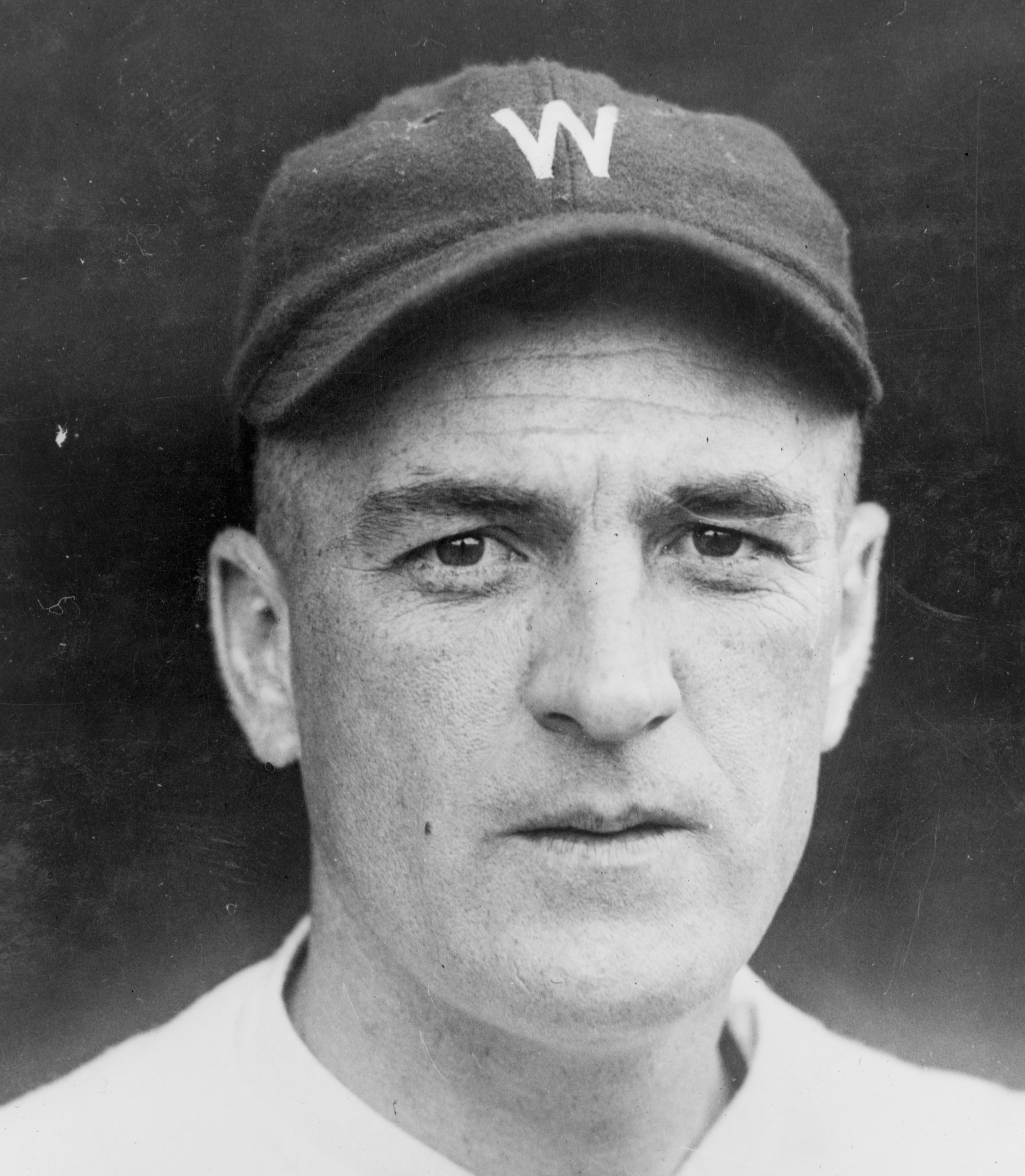
- First baseman
- Born: May 25, 1894; Brooklyn, New York, U.S.
- Died: March 11, 1963 (aged 68); Washington, D.C., U.S.
- Batted: Left Threw: Left

MLB debut
- September 20, 1915, for the Washington Senators

Last MLB appearance
- May 12, 1934, for the Boston Red Sox

MLB statistics
- Batting average: .298
- Hits: 2,352
- Home runs: 71
- Runs batted in: 1,034
- Stats at Baseball Reference

Teams
- Washington Senators (1915–1932); Brooklyn Dodgers (1933); Boston Red Sox (1933–1934)

Career highlights and awards
- World Series champion (1924)

Joseph Ignatius Judge (May 25, 1894 – March 11, 1963) was an American professional baseball player and coach. He played in Major League Baseball as a first baseman from 1915 through 1934, most notably as a member of the Washington Senators team with whom he won a World Series championship in 1924. Judge set American League records for career games (2,056), putouts (19,021), assists (1,284), total chances (20,444), double plays (1,476) and fielding percentage (.993) at first base, and led the AL in fielding average five times, then a record. He also batted over .300 nine times, and hit .385 in the 1924 World Series as the Senators won their only championship. At the time of his retirement in 1934, he ranked tenth in AL history in hits (2,328) and doubles (431), seventh in games played (2,129), eighth in triples (158) and at bats (7,786), and ninth in walks (958).

== Career ==
Judge, who batted and threw left-handed, was born in Brooklyn, New York to parents from Ireland and grew up on New York's Upper East Side near 66th Street and 1st Avenue on what is now the site of Rockefeller University. He was noticed as a 12-year-old shortstop by a local postman, Bud Hannah, who bought him a first baseman's glove so that he could play at a more natural position.

After playing semipro ball in the New York area and having a tryout with the New York Giants in 1911, he signed with the Boston Red Sox in 1914. He hit over .300 as a minor leaguer before his contract was sold to the Senators in 1915, and broke into the major leagues with 12 games late that season. Right fielder Sam Rice, who would be his teammate for the next 18 years, made his debut a month earlier.

In the early years of his career, Judge was slowed by the dead ball, and by playing his home games in Griffith Stadium, which defied power hitting. In 12 of his 18 seasons with the Senators, fewer home runs were hit there than in any other AL park. Judge hit 2 home runs in 1917, but that was half of the entire team's total of 4 (three of which were hit in road games; also, opponents hit only 3 HRs while visiting Washington); the only major league team since 1900 to have fewer home runs were the 1908 Chicago White Sox, who had 3. Judge ended 1917 with the seventh highest slugging average in the AL at .417, despite having only 2 homers and 15 doubles; however, he also added 15 triples, one of three times he would hit that many. In 1918, he had one of the Senators' five total home runs. In 1919 he set a club record with 81 walks, topping the 1911 total of 74 shared by Clyde Milan and Doc Gessler; Joe Cronin broke his record with 95 in 1929.

On July 1, 1920, Judge preserved the only no-hitter of Walter Johnson's career by snaring Harry Hooper's line drive down the first base line, tossing the ball to Johnson for the final out of the 1–0 victory over the Red Sox. He ended the season with a career-high .333 batting average, and would hit over .300 every year through 1930 except 1922 and 1926. In 1922 he tied Ed Delahanty's 1902 club record of 10 home runs; Goose Goslin broke the record with 12 in 1924.

Judge also passed Howard Shanks to take over the team's career home run record with 27; Goslin moved ahead of him in 1925. In addition, Judge collected 15 triples again along with 32 doubles, and finished eighth in the MVP voting. His 131 double plays that year broke Earl Sheely's AL record of 121 and came within one of George Kelly's major league mark, both set in 1921; Joe Hauser tied the AL record in 1924 before Sheely broke it again with 136 in 1925.

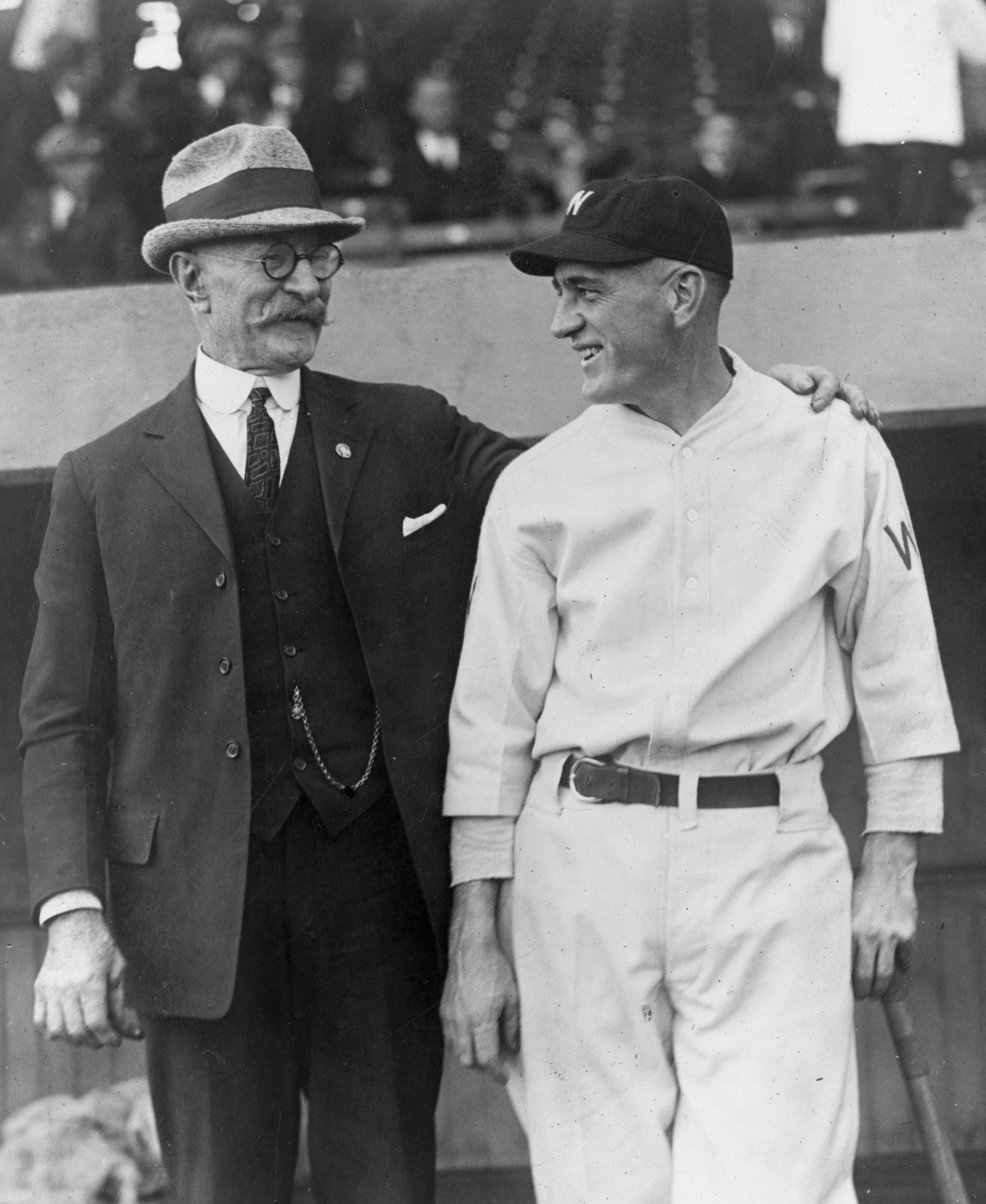
Joe Judge and his father at the World Series baseball game, 1924

The Senators had traditionally struggled, finishing higher than fourth place only four times in their first two decades, but now entered the strongest period in their history. Second baseman Bucky Harris had joined the starting lineup in 1920, and shortstop Roger Peckinpaugh had been acquired in 1922, with rookie third baseman Ossie Bluege also arriving briefly the same year. In 1922 Washington set a major league team record of 161 double plays, breaking the mark of 155 shared by the 1921 Giants and White Sox, and in 1923 – the first full season in which all four played together – the Senators shattered their own mark with 182; the record would be broken by the 1928 Cincinnati Reds, with 194. In 1923 the Senators also became only the fifth team in major league history – and the first since the 1912 Philadelphia Athletics with their "$100,000 infield" – to have all four infielders lead the league in double plays. Judge led the AL in fielding for the first time that year with a .993 average.

In 1924 the Senators won their first pennant, edging the three-time defending league champion New York Yankees by two games. Batting fifth in the World Series against the Giants, Judge scored on Peckinpaugh's double with one out in the ninth inning of Game 2 for a 4–3 victory; he also completed three double plays in the game, one of which ended an inning with the bases loaded. He got three hits each in the losses in Games 3 and 5; Washington took the Series in seven games, winning 4–3 in 12 innings in the last game. They repeated as league champions in 1925, with Judge again pacing the AL with a .993 fielding average, and met the Pittsburgh Pirates in the World Series. Batting cleanup, Judge hit a home run in the second inning of Game 2 at Forbes Field for a 1–0 lead, though Pittsburgh won 3–2. In Game 3 he doubled to drive in the tying run in the third inning, and had a sacrifice fly with the bases loaded in the seventh to again tie the game 3–3; Washington went on to win 4–3. In Game 7 he drew a bases-loaded walk and later scored in a 4-run first inning, but Pittsburgh came back to win 9–7 and take the championship.

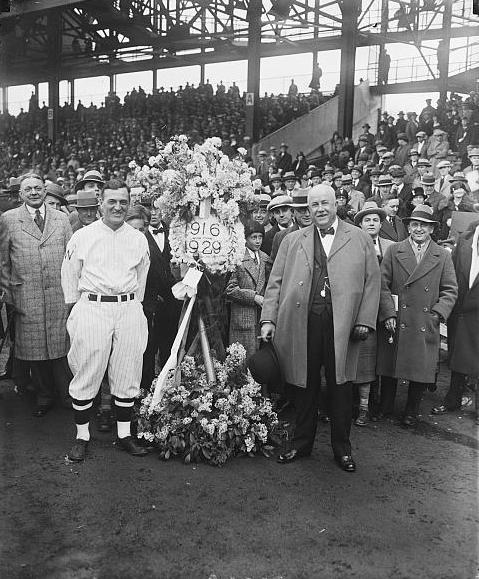
Joe Judge (front left), receives a flower tribute from the Elks Club for the team before a game in April 1929

Despite his small frame for a first baseman – 5 feet 8½ inches and 155 pounds – Judge led the AL in fielding average five times, an AL record for first basemen until Don Mattingly did so six times between 1984 and 1993. (Some sources credit Judge with leading the AL six times, but they count 1924 as a tie when he actually lost the title to Wally Pipp by a fraction of a point.) He led the AL in 1927 (.996), 1929 (.996) and 1930 (.998), committing only two errors in the latter season. In 1926 he broke Clyde Milan's team record of 105 career triples, though Sam Rice passed him the next year. In 1927, Judge also tied Milan's team record of 685 career walks. His career .993 fielding average set an AL mark that stood for more than three decades. In 1928 Judge collected a career-best 93 runs batted in and finished third in the MVP balloting. That year he passed George Burns to take over the league record for career games at first base, and he broke Burns' AL mark of 16,892 career putouts in 1929 and his record of 18,231 total chances in 1930. Judge broke George Sisler's AL record of 1134 career double plays in 1928, and his mark of 1251 career assists in 1932. In 1930 he enjoyed his last strong season, again reaching double figures in doubles (29), triples (11) and home runs (10). By the time he left the Senators after the 1932 season he was among the AL's top ten players in career runs and total bases, though he was edged out of the top ten by the time he retired.

Judge was disappointed over not being named manager of the Senators in 1933, being passed over in favor of 26-year-old shortstop Cronin, who led the team to the pennant in his first year. Although Judge had no hard feelings about the decision, respecting owner Clark Griffith's hunch and remembering that 27-year-old Harris had managed the Senators to the 1924 championship in his first year, he joined the Brooklyn Dodgers for the 1933 season. After hitting .214 in 42 games in his first National League experience, he switched to the Red Sox in midseason and batted .296 in 35 games for them. He finished his career with 10 games for the Red Sox in early 1934, batting .333, and then briefly managed the minor league Baltimore Orioles for several weeks.

In a 20-season career, Judge hit .298 with 1034 RBI in 2171 games; he also collected 2,352 hits and 213 stolen bases with a .378 on-base percentage. He ranked second to Sam Rice in Washington history in games (2084), at bats (7663), hits (2291), runs (1154), RBI (1004), doubles (421), triples (157) and total bases (3239). His 71 career home runs, all with Washington, were second in club history to Goslin's 125. His 249 sacrifice hits for the team remain the record for the Senators/Minnesota Twins franchise. His 2084 career games at first base then trailed only Jake Beckley (2377) and Charlie Grimm (2094) in major league history, and his 1543 double plays trailed only Grimm's 1733. Lou Gehrig broke his AL records for career games, putouts, total chances and double plays at first base in 1938; Mickey Vernon broke his league record for career assists in 1955. Eddie Yost broke his franchise record of 943 career walks in 1955 as well.

== Post-playing career, personal life and death ==
Following his retirement as a player, Judge coached the Georgetown University baseball team between 1936 and 1958, except for two seasons as a Senators coach in 1945–46 under manager Ossie Bluege. With his 1946 service, Judge barely qualified for the newly established pension system; his initial $250 investment qualified him for a $510 monthly pension after he turned 63. He was offered the Senators' managing job after the 1947 season, but he declined due to his desire to not travel heavily.

Judge's son Joseph Judge became a writer and editor, most notably at National Geographic. His grandson, Mark Judge, is a non-fiction author and conservative essayist. Mark wrote a book about his grandfather entitled Damn Senators in 2004.

Judge died at 68 after suffering a heart attack while shoveling snow outside his home in the Chevy Chase neighborhood of Washington, D.C., and was buried in Gate of Heaven Cemetery in Silver Spring, Maryland.

== Trivia ==
- Walter Johnson's roommate, Judge virtually ended Johnson's career in 1927 spring training when a batting practice line drive broke his ankle.
- The character of Joe Hardy in the 1955 Broadway musical Damn Yankees may have been based on Joe Judge. The author, Douglass Wallop, dated Judge's daughter Dorothy in the 1940s.

== See also ==
- List of Major League Baseball career hits leaders
- Murderers' Row
- List of Major League Baseball career doubles leaders
- List of Major League Baseball career triples leaders
- List of Major League Baseball career runs scored leaders
- List of Major League Baseball career runs batted in leaders
- List of Major League Baseball career stolen bases leaders
- List of Major League Baseball triples records
