= God and Man at Georgetown Prep =

2005 memoir by Mark Gauvreau Judge

- Author: Mark Gauvreau Judge
- Subject: Catholic school Alcoholism; Binge drinking Hookup culture
- Genre: Memoir
- Published: 2005
- Publisher: Crossroad Publishing Company
- Publication place: United States
- Media type: Paperback
- Pages: 182
- ISBN: 978-0824523138
- OCLC: 58546219
- Preceded by: Damn Senators (2003)
- Followed by: A Tremor of Bliss (2010)

God and Man at Georgetown Prep: How I Became a Catholic Despite 20 Years of Catholic Schooling is a 2005 memoir about Catholic school, alcoholism, binge drinking, and hookup culture at Georgetown Preparatory School, written by Mark Gauvreau Judge. The name of the book is a reference to conservative writer William F. Buckley Jr.'s 1951 college memoir God and Man at Yale. Judge had previously written a 1997 memoir about the same institution, Wasted: Tales of a GenX Drunk. He would go on to publish a third book about Catholicism in 2010, A Tremor of Bliss.

The author details rampant alcohol abuse at Georgetown Preparatory School, including downing beers with a music teacher from the school, while the teacher was entertained by a stripper. The author recounts a "100 Kegs or Bust" challenge, where the goal was to consume 100 kegs of beer before the end of the school year. Judge chronicles his exit from religiousness, followed by a return to Catholicism later in life. He criticizes those who diverge from traditional Catholicism and advocates for a return to more stringent religious practices.

Judge's book garnered reviews from multiple publications including Publishers Weekly, First Things, Christianity Today, and the National Catholic Register. Publishers Weekly called the book "a humorous, edgy look" at the author's Catholic school experiences. First Things called it "a compelling account". Christianity Today recommended the book as "a model for an intellectual life". National Catholic Register characterized the work as a "wonderful and ultimately hopeful book". Jerry Oppenheimer wrote in his 2015 book, RFK Jr. that Judge's book significantly affected Georgetown Preparatory School. Oppenheimer commented that the book "caused quite a storm", due to its revelation by Judge that "alcoholism was rampant" at the school.

God and Man at Georgetown Prep received increased attention in 2018 during the Brett Kavanaugh Supreme Court nomination in the wake of statements by psychologist Christine Blasey Ford that implicated Brett Kavanaugh and Mark Judge in possible sexual assault. Demand for Judge's work significantly increased after reporting by The Washington Post on his books and the statements by Ford. The price of the book rose to US$550 in Internet purchases. In the wake of the increased attention to student alcohol consumption, the president of Georgetown Preparatory School released a public letter saying he was trying to change the situation.

== Contents summary ==
God and Man at Georgetown Prep examines the author's trials and travails at three different well-respected Catholic educational institutions in the United States. Judge discusses how his initial education in multiple Catholic schools motivated him to wish to become less religious in nature. He circles back to religion later in life, and discusses how he eventually found a renewed strength in Catholicism. The author recounts the religiousness of his father, Joseph Judge. Judge discusses a broken road of various mistakes made throughout his lifetime, which in the end brought him back to Catholicism as his choice of how to practice his faith.

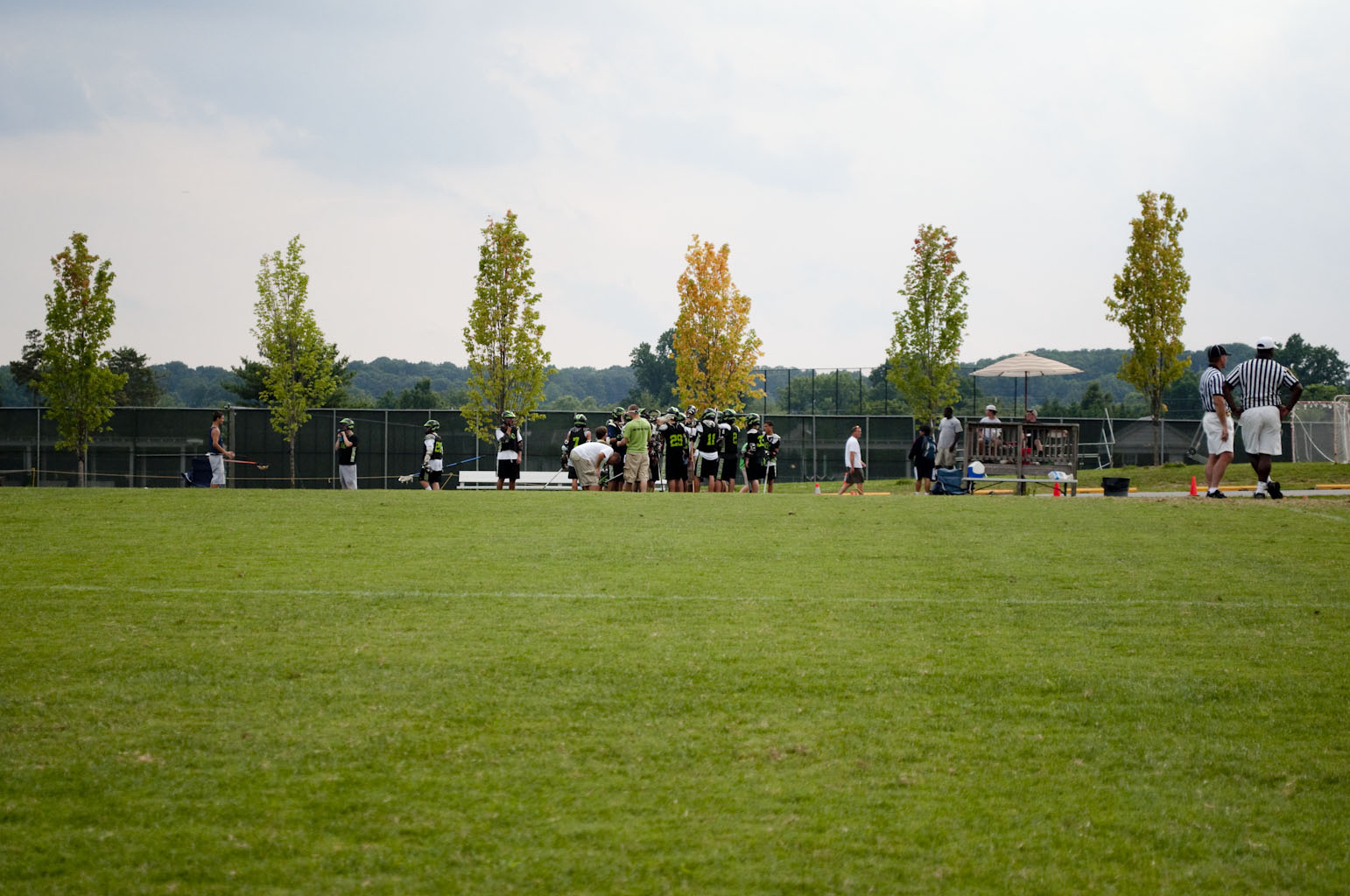
Georgetown Preparatory School in 2009

The author criticizes what he views as a form of atheism through non-religious practice of Catholicism among Christians in the American middle class. Judge explains his perspective that the Catholic faith he observed being taught in Catholic schools from his youth in the 1970s had been unnecessarily simplified from its traditional moorings. He laments that at Georgetown Preparatory School during his time as a student there, the faculty appeared to embrace sexuality and New Age views in favor of Catholic doctrine. Judge writes that the faculty at Georgetown Prep contained a multitude of homosexual priests.

God and Man at Georgetown Prep details an atmosphere of unmonitored copious alcohol consumption among members of the student body at Georgetown Preparatory School. The book recounts how the author published the school's underground newspaper that had information on wild parties. The paper was distributed among students at Georgetown Preparatory School, and entitled, The Unknown Hoya, also released under the title The Heretic. In one periodical, the newspaper showed an image of a music teacher attending a bachelor party. According to Judge, the music teacher was shown, "chugging a beer, surrounded by a group of us with raised mugs, sitting down while being entertained by the stripper." The author admits that at Georgetown Preparatory School, the students "partied with gusto–often right under the noses of our teachers". The author recounts a "100-Keg Quest" also known as "100 Kegs or Bust" in the book, an attempt during his time at Georgetown Preparatory School to have consumed 100 kegs of beer by the end of the school year. Judge states that his and his fellow students' attempt to reach the 100 kegs of beer challenge resulted in a "disastrous" drinking incident "at my house where the place was trashed".

The author extends to a critique of his time at Catholic University of America as a baccalaureate student. Similar to his writings about Georgetown Preparatory School, Judge criticizes his university for eschewing traditional Catholic doctrine in favor of newer views such as those who advocated an ability to oppose a ban on birth control. Judge writes that these views are a form of apostasy.

Judge traces his career as a journalist after obtaining his undergraduate degree. He cites the impact of his early success, publishing articles on society, belief, and culture for In These Times, The Progressive, and The Washington Post. Unfortunately, although he writes that he achieves early success as a journalist, at the same time Judge was suffering from negative impacts of alcoholism. He attributes his ability to overcome alcoholism to Alcoholics Anonymous, later also criticizing the organization for its casting off of its original influences from Christianity.

After the author's father passes away from cancer, Judge explains this motivated him to return to his original faith and religion of Catholicism. Judge explains his period of religious renewal, writing, "My father had been dead for several months before it dawned on me that he'd been a Catholic." The author recounts reading the collected books on Catholicism previously owned by his father, including writings by Dietrich von Hildebrand, Joseph Pieper, Jacques Maritain, and G.K. Chesterton. The author realizes what he was missing from his experiences at three Catholic schools, writing, "I am a member of a generation of Catholics raised after Vatican II who was cheated out of a Catholic education."

== Composition and publication ==
Prior to writing God and Man at Georgetown Prep, Judge had worked as a journalist in his early twenties. He was a freelance writer in 1989 in the Washington, D.C. area. Judge received his bachelor of arts degree from Catholic University of America in 1990. By 1990 he had become a contributor to The Progressive, In These Times, and Sojourners. Judge briefly taught at Georgetown University, but left in the 1990s. Before publishing God and Man at Georgetown Prep, Judge had written a previous book on the subject of alcoholism at the same school, Wasted: Tales of a GenX Drunk. Judge published God and Man at Georgetown Prep in 2005. The book was released in a print format by Crossroad Publishing Company. It was published in eBook format the same year. Judge's subsequent book on the same topic of Catholicism and religious practice, A Tremor of Bliss: Sex, Catholicism, and Rock 'n' Roll, was published in 2010.

== Critical reception ==
Publishers Weekly called the book, "a humorous, edgy look at his experiences in three prestigious U.S. Catholic schools." First Things reviewed the book, and called it a "compelling account". The religious journal concluded, "God and Man at Georgetown Prep is warmly recommended for young people, their parents and teachers".

Christianity Today published a book review of Judge's work, and observed, "In God and Man at Georgetown Prep, Mark Gauvreau Judge writes as a survivor not of abuse, but of neglect." The book review drew comparisons to God and Man at Yale by William F. Buckley. Christianity Today concluded, "Catholics and non-Catholics alike will find in his account a model for an intellectual life firmly rooted in the particularities of one faith tradition, yet determined to speak to the world in a common language."

National Catholic Register found Judge's writing to be too vague, commenting, "There are too many theories and too little space." The reviewer lamented the author had found no true religious meaning from his early Catholic upbringing. The book review observed, "Judge has written an autobiography that is part Thomas Merton, part Augustine with a rock and roll beat in the background." National Catholic Register worried the author's views echoed those of others who had also become less religious since their initial Catholic upbringing, "Sadly, his story–laid out in painful detail in this wonderful and ultimately hopeful book—differs little from that of millions of baby-boomer Catholics." The Washington Times commented, "Some authors try to separate themselves from their arguments. Mr. Judge's books tend toward the confessional." God and Man at Georgetown Prep received a book review in Crisis Magazine.

Jerry Oppenheimer wrote in his 2015 book RFK Jr.: Robert F. Kennedy Jr. and the Dark Side of the Dream that Judge's book affected the educational institution of Georgetown Preparatory School itself: "It caused quite a storm, especially among the alumni and administration going back decades, because Judge, a conservative Catholic, had alleged that 'alcoholism was rampant' among the 'left-wing Jesuits' and claimed that the school had been a hotbed of 'rampant homosexuality.' Half of the faculty, he asserted, 'was gay.'"

God and Man at Georgetown Prep received increased attention in 2018 during the Brett Kavanaugh Supreme Court nomination, in the wake of statements by psychologist Christine Blasey Ford that implicated Brett Kavanaugh and Mark Judge in possible sexual assault. Judge wrote to the U.S. Senate to say he had "no memory" of the incident described by Ford. Judge said he did not wish to testify. God and Man at Georgetown Prep and the author's previous book about the same educational institution, Wasted, were highlighted in The Washington Post after the statements by Ford. Multiple U.S. Senators acquired copies of Judge's books on his time with Kavanuagh at Georgetown Preparatory School, to prepare for questioning of Kavanaugh and Ford before the United States Senate Committee on the Judiciary. Both the demand for Judge's work in light of the comments by Ford, in addition to the reporting by The Washington Post, drove renewed interest in works by the author about his time at Georgetown Preparatory School. Demand for God and Man at Georgetown Prep, drove the price of the book up to US$550 online. James Van Dyke, the president of Georgetown Preparatory School, released a public letter after reporting on Judge and Kavanaugh and the history of alcoholic drinking at the educational institution, stating he was attempting to change the culture at the school.
