= Mark Judge (writer) =

American journalist and author (born 1964)

- Born: September 24, 1964 (age 61)
- Education: Catholic University of America (BA)
- Occupation: Writer
- Years active: 1989–present
- Notable work: Wasted: Tales of a GenX Drunk (1997); If It Ain't Got That Swing (2000); Damn Senators (2003); God and Man at Georgetown Prep (2005); A Tremor of Bliss (2010)
- Father: Joseph Judge
- Relatives: Joe Judge (grandfather)

Mark Gauvreau Judge (born September 24, 1964) is an American author and journalist known for books about his suburban Washington, D.C. youth, recovery from alcoholism, and the role of music in American popular culture.

Judge briefly drew national attention during the 2018 Supreme Court nomination hearings of Brett Kavanaugh, when professor Christine Blasey Ford alleged that Judge was present and laughing as Kavanaugh sexually assaulted her when they were high school students over 30 years previously. Judge said that he had no memory of the incident. He wrote a book about his experiences titled The Devil's Triangle: Mark Judge vs the New American Stasi. It was published in 2022.

== Early life and education ==
Judge was born in 1964. His father, Joseph Judge, graduated from Catholic University of America in 1950 and subsequently became a journalist for Life and then for National Geographic. Judge is the grandson of Joe Judge, a Major League Baseball player for the Washington Senators for the period 1915–1932; he later wrote a book about his grandfather.

Judge grew up in Montgomery County, Maryland. He describes his parents as often inattentive and recounts that he observed his father's heavy drinking of alcohol. Judge started drinking at 14. He attended Georgetown Preparatory School, graduating in 1983. Judge was friends with classmate Brett Kavanaugh; both were in the same class there with Maryland State Senate member Richard Madaleno. The period became the subject of scrutiny in 2018 when Kavanaugh was nominated to the United States Supreme Court, and allegations were made that in 1982 Judge witnessed Kavanaugh sexually assaulting Christine Blasey Ford, then a student from a local girls' school. Judge received his Bachelor of Arts degree from Catholic University of America (CUA) in 1990.

== Career ==
Judge was a freelance writer in 1989 in the Washington, D.C. area. By 1990 he had become a contributor to The Progressive, In These Times, and Sojourners. Judge briefly taught at Georgetown University but left in the 1990s. In 1997 Judge wrote Wasted: Tales of a GenX Drunk, a memoir about his youthful alcoholism. The New York Times review called it a "naive and earnest" book. Judge resided in Potomac, Maryland in 1998. Judge was a contributing writer to the New York Press, an alternative weekly, in 1999.

Judge published If It Ain't Got That Swing: The Rebirth of Grown-Up Culture in 2000. The book chronicled the author's transition from support of liberalism towards right-wing politics. Judge writes that he was influenced by the writings of Christopher Lasch, especially his work The Culture of Narcissism. By February 2001, Judge's book If It Ain't Got That Swing had become a bestseller in the United States; The book received largely negative reviews.

Judge's book Damn Senators, about his Major League Baseball player grandfather Joe Judge, was published in 2003 to favorable reviews. The Weekly Standard wrote of the author's description of 1924: "Mark Gauvreau Judge, has beautifully captured the excitement and intensity of that season." On Weekend Edition, journalist Michael Kranish highlighted Judge's book Damn Senators among his favorite summer reading picks in 2004. The Wall Street Journal wrote that Judge "so nicely captured" the "glory of Washington baseball" in Damn Senators.

In God and Man at Georgetown Prep (2005), Judge wrote that the faculty at Georgetown Prep contained a multitude of homosexual priests, and heavy drinking and wild parties were rampant among the students. Biographer Jerry Oppenheimer wrote in his 2015 book RFK Jr.: Robert F. Kennedy Jr. and the Dark Side of the Dream, that Judge's book "caused quite a storm, especially among the alumni and administration going back decades, because Judge, a conservative Catholic, had alleged that 'alcoholism was rampant' among the 'left-wing Jesuits' and claimed that the school had been a hotbed of 'rampant homosexuality.' Half of the faculty, he asserted, 'was gay.'" Publishers Weekly called the book "a humorous, edgy look at his experiences in three prestigious U.S. Catholic schools." National Catholic Register found Judge's writing to be too vague, commenting, "There are too many theories and too little space."

The Wichita Eagle recommended a piece by Judge for Christianity Today in 2006, commenting it evidenced the ability of religious believers to appreciate the good that musical culture can bring to society. Judge's book, A Tremor of Bliss: Sex, Catholicism, and Rock 'n' Roll, was published in 2010. First Things wrote, "An insightful history of the rise of contraception in the last century provides the most valuable material in A Tremor of Bliss." The publication recommended Judge's work, concluding, "A Tremor of Bliss is a book well worth reading from an author unafraid of showing some 'attitude.'" Jeremy Lott of The Washington Times reviewed the book, concluding, "Judge proposes a Catholic sexual counterrevolution, though he doesn't want to call it that. What he clearly does want is U.S. Catholic education to play a vital role in countering the current almost-anything-goes culture." In addition to writing books, Judge has contributed to The Wall Street Journal, The New York Times, The Washington Post, The Weekly Standard, and First Things.

Regarding LGBT people, Judge wrote in The Daily Caller, "We simply are not allowed to talk about certain things at the risk of our jobs and reputations. One is human anatomy, another is the problem of promiscuity in the gay community." Judge wrote a piece titled "Hard Case Crime: the Beauty of Male Passion" on Splice Today lamenting that "today's social justice warriors don't like a sexy damsel in distress". Judge elaborated that "Of course ... no means no and yes means yes. But there's also that ambiguous middle ground, where the woman seems interested and indicates, whether verbally or not, that the man needs to prove himself to her. And if that man is any kind of man, he'll allow himself to feel the awesome power, the wonderful beauty, of uncontrollable male passion."

== Brett Kavanaugh Supreme Court nomination ==
In 2018, Judge was implicated in an alleged sexual assault that surfaced after his high school classmate Brett Kavanaugh was nominated to the Supreme Court of the United States. On September 27, Christine Blasey Ford testified under oath before the United States Senate Committee on the Judiciary that when all three were in high school at a party in 1982, Judge and Kavanaugh pushed her into a bedroom where Kavanaugh pinned her to a bed, groped her, and attempted to remove her clothes against her will while Judge watched and laughed. Judge told The New Yorker that he had "no recollection" of the alleged incident. In a follow-up interview with The Weekly Standard, Judge called the allegations "just absolutely nuts. I never saw Brett act that way." Asked if there was "rough-housing" with female peers that the Weekly Standard interviewer suggested "might have been interpreted differently by parties involved", Judge said he only recollected it taking place among the male students of the all-boys school: "I don't remember any of that stuff going on with girls." He subsequently sent a letter to the Senate Judiciary Committee saying, "I have no memory of this alleged incident." Judge also stated he did not wish to speak further about the incident. Following the announcement of the allegations Judge disappeared from the Washington D.C. area as a media firestorm erupted, temporarily moving to a beach house 130 miles away in Bethany Beach, Delaware on the recommendation of his lawyer. He was finally tracked down and found a week later by a Washington Post reporter outside the home, along with his car, which was filled with his belongings.

Multiple U.S. senators acquired copies of Judge's books about his time with Kavanaugh at Georgetown Preparatory School, to prepare for questioning Kavanaugh and Ford before the United States Senate Committee on the Judiciary. In a subsequent New Yorker article, Elizabeth Rasor, who was once in a relationship with Judge for three years, stated that "Mark told me a very different story." She said he told her of taking turns having sex with drunk women at Georgetown Prep. Another woman also disputed Judge's account of the social scene at the time, sending a letter to Ford's lawyers saying that she had witnessed boys at parties, that included Georgetown Prep students, engaging in sexual misconduct.

On September 28, 2018, Senator Richard Blumenthal made a motion before the United States Senate Committee on the Judiciary to subpoena Judge to testify about Kavanaugh. Blumenthal said before calling his motion, "He has never been questioned by any member of our committee. He has never submitted a detailed account of what he knows and so I move ... that we subpoena Mark Judge." Blumenthal noted, "The third person in the room was Mark Judge, who was never questioned by the FBI or interviewed by the committee." Republicans defeated the motion for a subpoena on a party-line vote. US Congressman Ted Lieu of the United States House Committee on the Judiciary and Congressman Elijah Cummings of the United States House Committee on Oversight and Government Reform stated their intentions to subpoena Judge and call him for testimony before the US Congress, after the 2018 US midterm elections. After Republican US Senator Jeff Flake called for an FBI investigation, Judge released a statement that he would cooperate with all law enforcement authorities regarding the allegations against Kavanaugh. After a request from Flake, followed by a request from the US Senate Judiciary Committee, President Trump ordered an FBI investigation into the sexual assault allegations.

== Publications ==
=== Books ===
- Judge, Mark Gauvreau (1997). Wasted: Tales of a GenX Drunk. Hazelden. ISBN 978-1568381428.
- Judge, Mark Gauvreau (2000). If It Ain't Got That Swing: The Rebirth of Grown-Up Culture. Spence Publishing Company. ISBN 978-1890626242.
- Judge, Mark Gauvreau (2003). Damn Senators: My Grandfather and the Story of Washington's Only World Series Championship. Encounter Books. ISBN 978-1893554702.
- Judge, Mark Gauvreau (2005). God and Man at Georgetown Prep: How I Became a Catholic Despite 20 Years of Catholic Schooling. Crossroad Publishing Company. ISBN 978-0824523138.
- Judge, Mark (2010). A Tremor of Bliss: Sex, Catholicism, and Rock 'n' Roll. Doubleday Religion. ISBN 978-0385519205.
- Judge, Mark (2022). The Devil's Triangle: Mark Judge vs the New American Stasi. Bombardier Books. ISBN 978-1637580721.

=== Articles ===
- Judge, Mark Gauvreau (October 1, 1995). "Dance of Democracy: The Cheek-to-Cheek Cure for the Alienation That Ails Us". The Washington Post. p. C1.
- Judge, Mark Gauvreau (April 5, 1998). "All Grown Up and No Place to Go". The Washington Post. p. C1.
- Judge, Mark Gauverau (March 10, 1997). The New Conservative Attack on the Suburbs. Archived from the original on September 20, 2018.
- Judge, Mark Gauvreau (February 28, 2000). The End of Woodstock. Archived from the original on September 20, 2018.
- Judge, Mark Gauvreau (2001). Ken Burns Ain't Got That Swing. Claremont Institute for the Study of Statemanship and Political Philosophy.
- Judge, Mark Gauvreau (November 2006). The Gospel of Kurt Elling.

== See also ==
- List of American conservatives
- List of Catholic University of America people
- List of Georgetown Prep alumni
