= Brett Kavanaugh Supreme Court nomination =

2018 US Supreme Court nomination

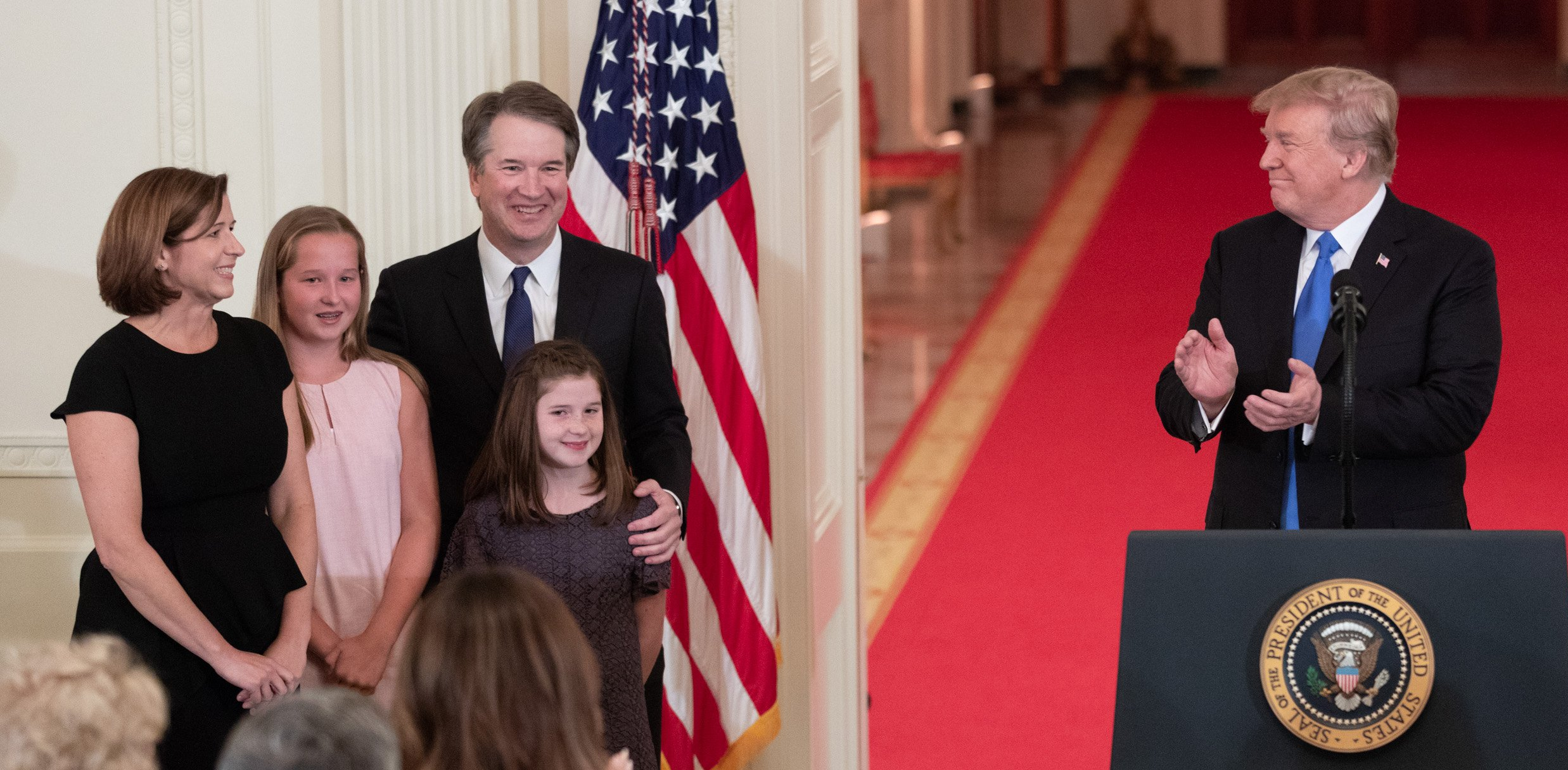
- President Trump announcing the nomination, joined by Kavanaugh and Kavanaugh's family
- Nominee: Brett Kavanaugh
- Nominated by: Donald Trump (president of the United States)
- Succeeding: Anthony Kennedy (associate justice)
- Date nominated: July 9, 2018
- Date confirmed: October 6, 2018
- Outcome: Approved by the U.S. Senate

Vote of the Senate Judiciary Committee
- Votes in favor: 11
- Votes against: 10
- Result: Reported favorably

Senate cloture vote
- Votes in favor: 51
- Votes against: 49
- Result: Cloture invoked

Senate confirmation vote
- Votes in favor: 50
- Votes against: 48
- Not voting: 2
- Result: Confirmed

On July 9, 2018, President Donald Trump nominated Brett Kavanaugh for Associate Justice of the Supreme Court of the United States to succeed retiring Justice Anthony Kennedy. When nominated, Kavanaugh was a judge of the United States Court of Appeals for the District of Columbia Circuit, a position he was appointed to in 2006 by President George W. Bush.

The Senate Judiciary Committee questioned Kavanaugh and heard witness testimonies concerning his nomination to the Supreme Court over the course of a four-day hearing, September 4–7, 2018. Several days later, it was revealed that psychology professor Christine Blasey Ford had written a letter to Senator Dianne Feinstein in July accusing Kavanaugh of sexual assault while they were both in high school in 1982. The Committee postponed its vote and invited both Kavanaugh and Blasey Ford to appear at a public Senate hearing. In the interim, two other women, Deborah Ramirez and Julie Swetnick, accused Kavanaugh of separate past instances of sexual assault.

Both Kavanaugh and Blasey Ford testified before the Committee on September 27; the following day the nomination was forwarded to the full Senate on an 11–10 vote. Then, on October 6, 2018, following a supplemental FBI investigation into the allegations, the Senate voted 50–48 to confirm Kavanaugh's nomination to the Supreme Court.

== Nomination ==
=== Potential candidates ===
Associate Justice Anthony Kennedy, a pivotal swing vote on the Supreme Court, announced on June 27, 2018, that he would retire at the end of July, after having served on the court for over 30 years. His departure gave President Donald Trump his second opportunity to appoint a justice to the Supreme Court (following the nomination of Neil Gorsuch a year earlier).

During the 2016 presidential campaign, then-candidate Trump released two lists of potential Supreme Court nominees, along with a supplemental list in November 2017. While responding to reporters' questions following Kennedy's announcement, President Trump said that the vacancy would be filled by "somebody from that list." Those considered front-runners for the nomination by press reports, in addition to Kavanaugh, were Amy Coney Barrett, Raymond Gruender, Thomas Hardiman, Raymond Kethledge, William H. Pryor Jr., and Amul Thapar. It was reported by Politico that Kennedy had expressed partiality towards Kavanaugh in his conversations with Trump and was more inclined to retire after Kavanaugh's addition to Trump's list.

=== Announcement ===
President Trump announced that he would nominate Kavanaugh, then a judge of the United States Court of Appeals for the District of Columbia Circuit, to succeed Justice Anthony Kennedy on July 9, 2018. Trump's stated reasons for choosing Kavanaugh included his "impeccable credentials, unsurpassed qualifications, and a proven commitment to equal justice under the law", and he emphasized that "what matters is not a judge's political views, but whether they can set aside those views to do what the law and the Constitution require."

From 1993 to 1994, Kavanaugh had served as a law clerk for Justice Kennedy. His name was not on either of the Trump campaign's pre-election "potential nominees" lists but was one of those added in November 2017. This was speculated to have been a decision intended to make Kennedy more comfortable with retiring.

=== Voting alignment ===
FiveThirtyEight attempted to analyze Kavanaugh's likely voting tendencies via Judicial Common Space scores (which are not based on a judge's behavior, but rather the ideology scores of home state senators and the appointing president) to find that Kavanaugh would likely be more conservative than Justices Samuel Alito and Neil Gorsuch, but less conservative than Justice Clarence Thomas if placed on the Supreme Court. A Washington Post statistical analysis estimated that the ideologies of most of Trump's announced candidates were "statistically indistinguishable" and placed Kavanaugh between Justices Gorsuch and Alito.

== Responses to the nomination ==
=== American Bar Association rating ===
The American Bar Association (ABA) gave Kavanaugh a unanimous "well qualified" rating for his nomination. However, on October 5, after Kavanaugh was accused of sexual impropriety, the chairman of the ABA Standing Committee on the Federal Judiciary announced that the committee had reopened its evaluation "regarding temperament" and that reassessment and re-vote would not be completed before the Senate vote. Following Kavanaugh's confirmation, the standing committee discontinued the re-evaluation because there is "no process for the evaluation of sitting judges or justices."

=== Support ===
Senate Republican leaders expressed support for Kavanaugh's nomination. Senate Majority Leader Mitch McConnell stated his intent to support the nomination, referring to Kavanaugh as "highly regarded throughout the legal community". Senate Judiciary Committee chairman Chuck Grassley also had high praise for Kavanaugh, calling him "one of the most qualified Supreme Court nominees to come before the Senate."

Former president George W. Bush stated his support for Kavanaugh and called President Trump to congratulate him on his choice. When the confirmation became more difficult, he actively called moderate Republican senators to ask them to vote in favor of Kavanaugh, such as Jeff Flake of Arizona and Susan Collins of Maine, as well as moderate Democrat Joe Manchin of West Virginia.

Stanford Law School professor Nathaniel Persily, a scholar of constitutional law, election law, and the democratic process, responded to the nomination writing that Kavanaugh "is eminently qualified and a very talented jurist." However, he went on to observe, "that is all quite beside the point in today’s political environment. The norms of Supreme Court confirmations have been degrading for some time."

Yale Law School professor Akhil Reed Amar, an expert on constitutional law and originalism, whose notable students include Kavanaugh, Chris Coons, and Cory Booker, called the nomination of Kavanaugh Trump's "finest hour, his classiest move". Amar also remarked that Kavanaugh "commands wide and deep respect among scholars, lawyers, and jurists".

Robert S. Bennett, an attorney who represented President Bill Clinton during the Lewinsky scandal (opposite Kavanaugh, who worked for independent counsel Kenneth Starr), stated that he supported Kavanaugh's confirmation.

In their blog, The Libre Initiative, a group funded by Freedom Partners, a nonprofit group backed by the Koch brothers and other conservative donors, encouraged Latinos to support Kavanaugh. The Latino Coalition (TLC), established in 1995 by Hispanic business owners and whose chairman is Hector Barreto, Administrator of the United States Small Business Administration from 2001 to 2006, also supported Kavanaugh.

=== Opposition ===
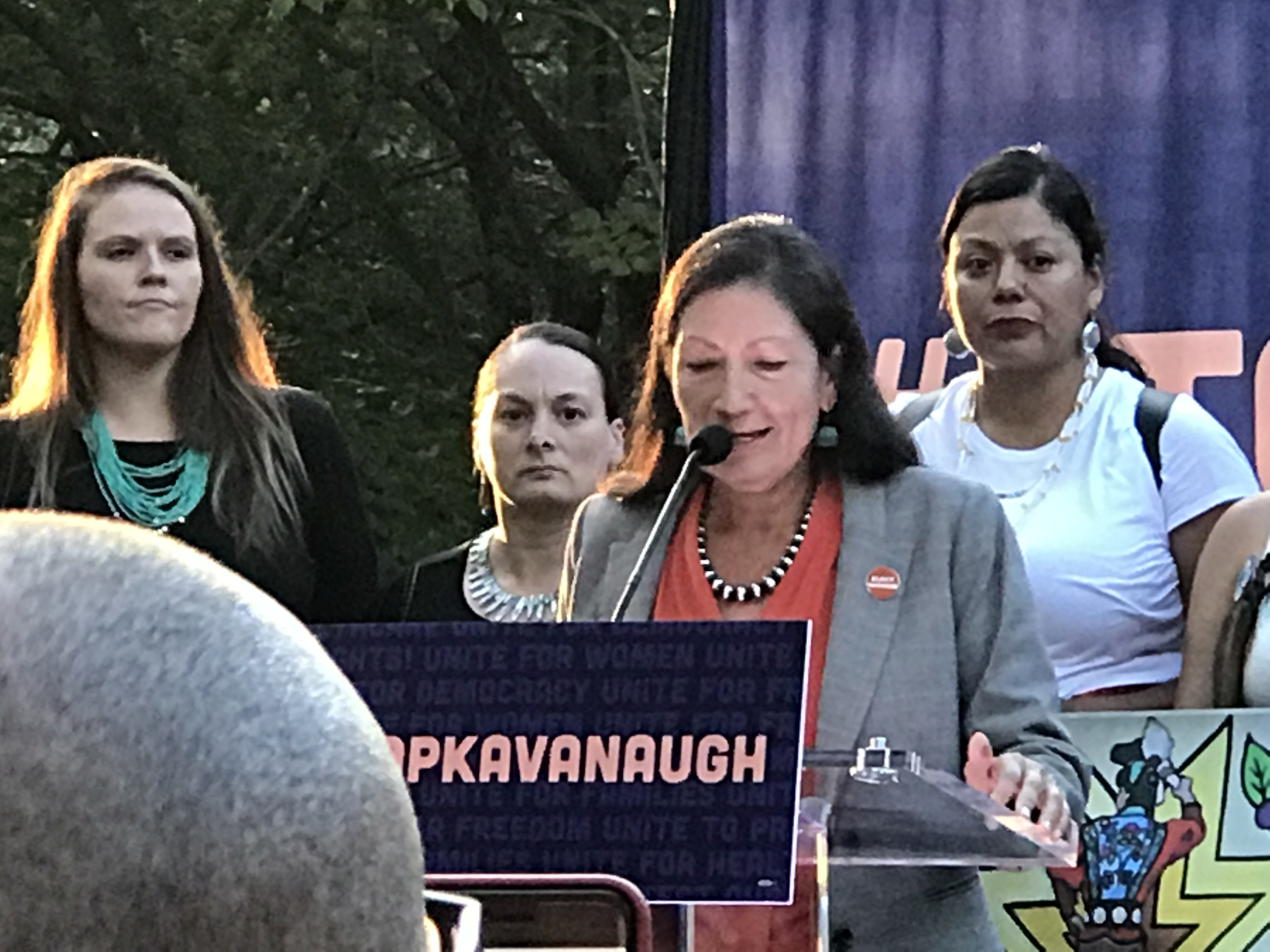
Deb Haaland and several other Native American women at Stop Kavanaugh Rally on the U.S. Capitol Grounds, September 4, 2018

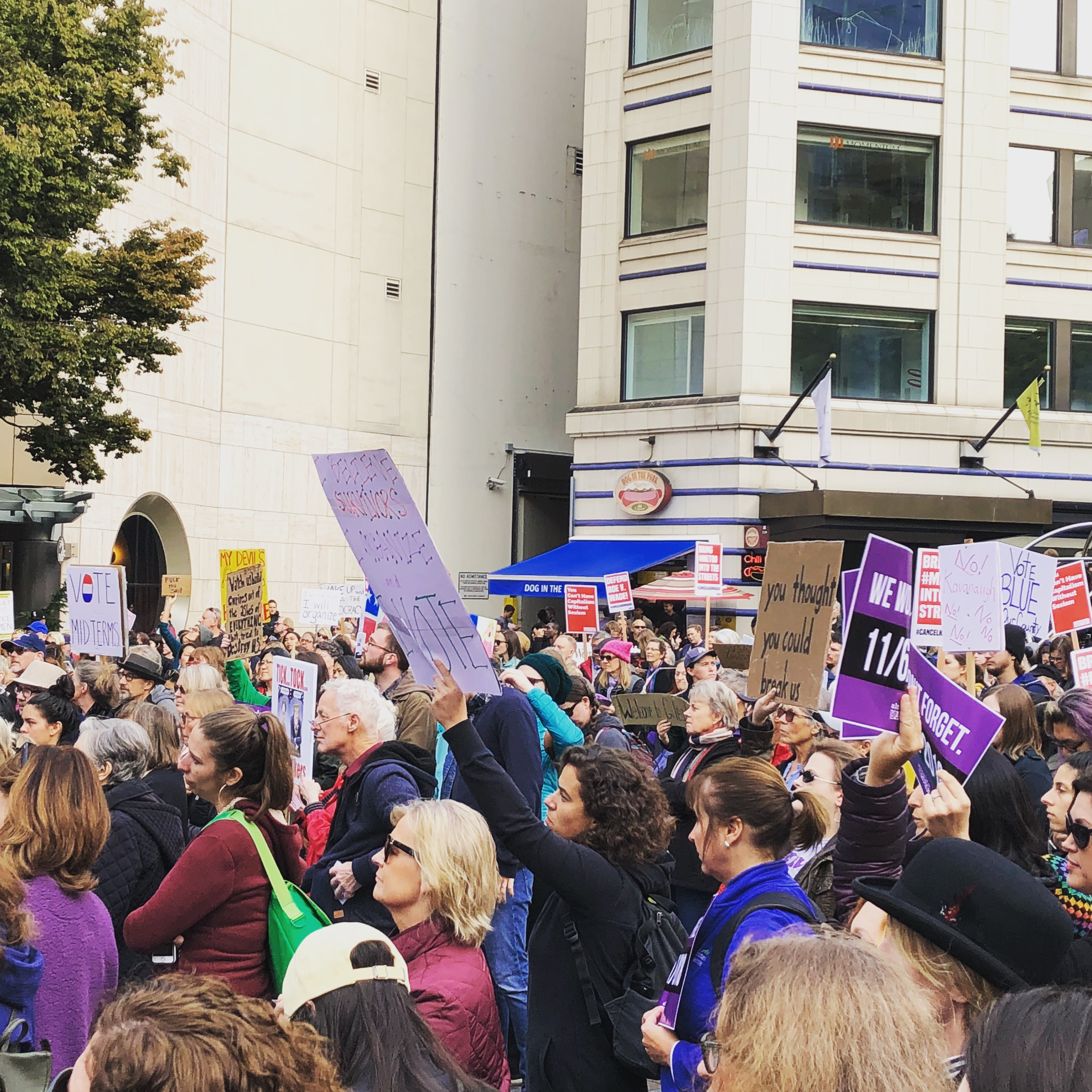
Following Kavanaugh's confirmation, several protests were held around the United States by women's rights activists.

A number of Senate Democrats, including Senate Minority Leader Chuck Schumer, stated their intent to oppose Kavanaugh's confirmation shortly after his nomination was announced.

A progressive group, Demand Justice, pledged $5 million to block the nomination. Demand Justice is a Sixteen Thirty Fund initiative. It purchased ads on Twitter, Facebook, and TV.

It was reported by Vox that some social conservatives were disappointed that Trump nominated Kavanaugh. The American Family Association, a socially conservative organization founded in 1977, immediately called on its members to rally against Kavanaugh. March for Life also expressed concerns that Kavanaugh's leadership bore similarities to that of Vice President Mike Pence, saying that the judge lacked the "backbone" to overturn Roe v. Wade.

An open letter rebuking Yale Law School over a press release celebrating Kavanaugh's nomination was signed by over 600 of its alumni.

The American Civil Liberties Union stated that Kavanaugh's record "demonstrates hostility to international law as a constraint on government action as well as an unwillingness to hold the government to account when it violates the constitutional and human rights of U.S. citizens and noncitizens" and that his "approach would give the president exceedingly broad and dangerous powers".

A number of progressive groups joined to launch a campaign known as #WhipTheVote to rally opposition to Kavanaugh's nomination, aimed particularly among moderate and conservative Democrats. "Democratic senators should be united in opposition to Kavanaugh, instead of letting Republican senators ram through the confirmation of a nominee who was selected to protect the president from prosecution,” read a statement from the effort's website. An open letter from Native Americans called upon senators to closely examine Kavanaugh's record regarding Native peoples, and felt he had failed to acknowledge the sovereignty, natural resources, and history and heritage of native people.

Benjamin Wittes, an official at the Brookings Institution and the Hoover Institution and a vocal critic of Donald Trump, initially expressed support for Kavanaugh but said that he would be confirmed "for all the wrong reasons" in an article attacking partisanship surrounding Supreme Court nominations. Wittes withdrew his support after Ford and Kavanaugh's testimony before the Senate, finding Ford "wholly credible" and Kavanaugh's account not credible on his drinking habits, and his performance improper and "unacceptable in a justice."

More than 2,400 American law professors signed a letter opposing Kavanaugh's confirmation on the basis of his "intemperate, inflammatory and partial manner" during his congressional testimony, without referencing any of the accusations about his behavior decades earlier.

Former Supreme Court justice John Paul Stevens, 98 years old at the time, stated on October 4, 2018, that he previously thought Kavanaugh "had the qualifications for the Supreme Court should he be selected," but "his performance in the hearings ultimately changed my mind."

Between September 10 and 16, 2018, Kavanaugh had the highest opposition (42%) of any of the eleven Supreme Court nominees Gallup had polled since Robert Bork in 1987.

The interdenominational National Council of Churches, which represents 100,000 congregations and 45 million churchgoers, released a statement on October 3, saying that Kavanaugh "possesses neither the temperament nor the character essential for a member of the highest court in our nation.”

On October 4, a Washington Post editorial opposing Kavanaugh's confirmation was released, their first opposition to a nominee since Robert Bork, citing his "hyperpartisan rhetoric" that "poisoned any sense that he could serve as an impartial judge."

That same day, three of Kavanaugh's Yale "drinking buddies" published an opinion piece opposing his confirmation, asserting that he was dishonest in his sworn testimony and in a Fox News interview without referencing any of the accusations against him.

=== Hearing preparations ===
Kavanaugh's nomination was submitted to the Senate on July 10, 2018. White House officials provided him with legal background materials, and Kavanaugh, along with key senators of the Judiciary Committee, held intensive preparations on the full range of questions that might be asked by committee members. Leonard Leo played a crucial role in orchestrating political and financial support for Kavanaugh's confirmation hearings.

Kavanaugh's guide through the confirmation process, informally titled "chief sherpa", was Jon Kyl. Kyl was tasked with creating a smooth path for Kavanaugh by acting as his advance man, media messenger and etiquette advisor. At the time he agreed to be Kavanaugh's guide, Kyl was a former U.S. senator. After Senator John McCain's death on August 25, 2018, the governor of Arizona Doug Ducey named Kyl as McCain's successor. He was sworn in on September 5, 2018, the opening day of the confirmation hearing.

== Documents battle ==
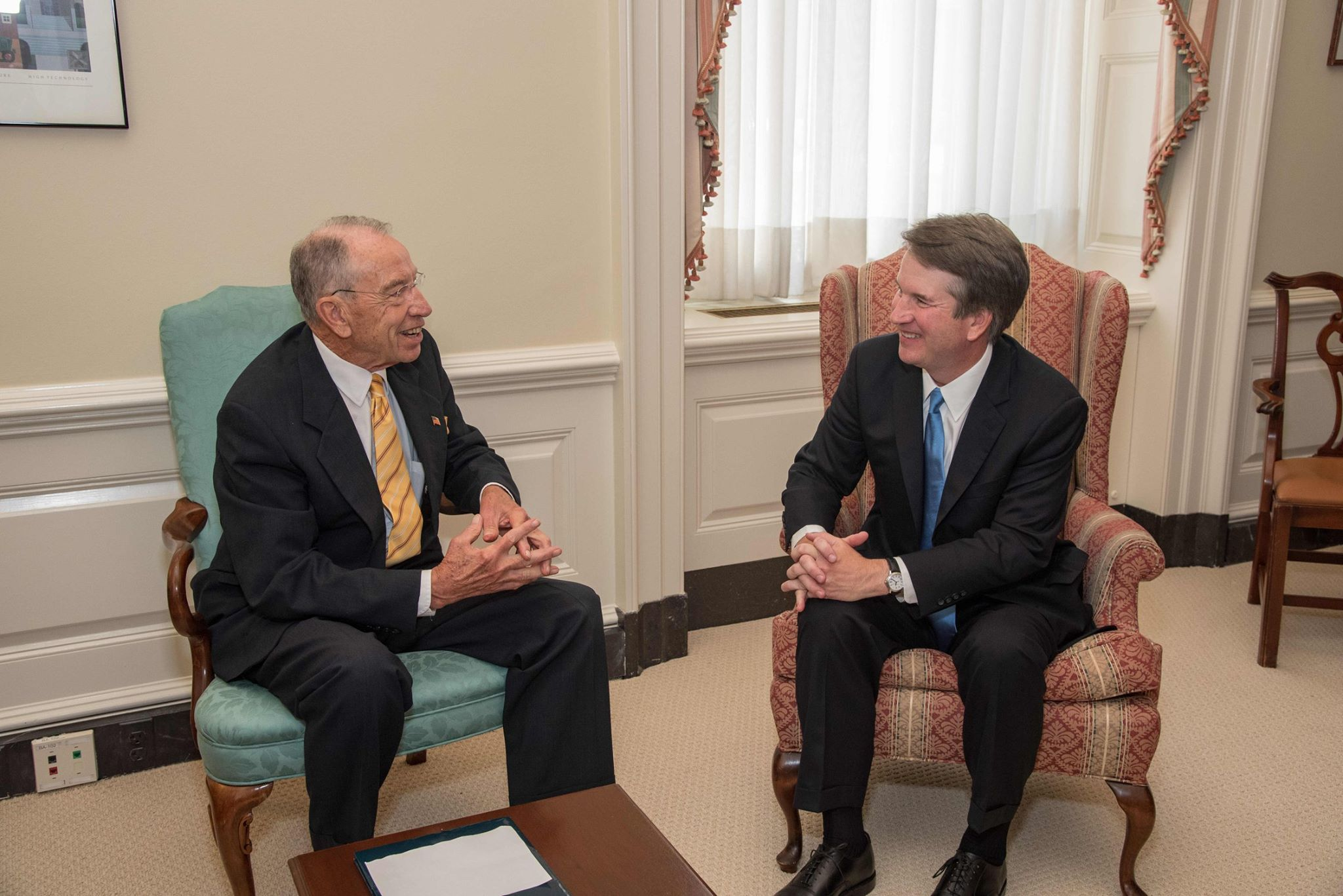
Brett Kavanaugh with Senate Judiciary Committee Chairman Chuck Grassley on July 12, 2018

Shortly after being nominated, Kavanaugh began making courtesy visits to senators at their Capitol Hill offices. By the first week of August, Kavanaugh had met with 47 senators, all but one of them Republican, with Joe Manchin the exception. According to the Senate Historical Office, this custom was initiated by Supreme Court nominee Harry Blackmun in 1970 and has been an important part of the process since.

Senate Democrats initially refused to meet with Kavanaugh, saying that before they did, the Republican leadership needed to agree to make available for their review all documents (perhaps exceeding 1 million pages) pertaining to Kavanaugh's tenure as White House staff secretary in the George W. Bush administration, his work on the 2000 United States presidential election recount in Florida, and his work on Independent Counsel Ken Starr's investigations concerning President Bill Clinton. By mid-August, however, several Democrats had either met with or had scheduled meetings with Kavanaugh.

By August 10, when Judiciary Committee chairman Chuck Grassley announced the confirmation hearing start date, the committee had received more than 184,000 pages of records from Kavanaugh's work as a White House lawyer and his work for Independent Counsel Ken Starr. It had also received documents detailing the 307 cases in which Kavanaugh wrote an opinion as an appeals court judge, the hundreds more opinions he joined, and the more than 17,500 pages of material he provided in response to the committee's bipartisan questionnaire. Subsequently, on September 3, the day before the hearing began, an additional 42,000 pages of documents became available to the committee. Altogether, about 415,000 pages of information had been transmitted to the committee, with about 147,000 of them withheld from public view. Though the Trump administration had released to the committee the largest number of Executive Branch records ever for the consideration of a Supreme Court nominee, it blocked release of over 101,000 additional pages of records, citing executive privilege.

== Confirmation hearing ==
=== September 4, 2018 ===
The Kavanaugh confirmation hearing before the Senate Judiciary Committee, chaired by Chuck Grassley, began September 4, 2018, in the Hart Senate Office Building. The hearing quickly became chaotic with protesters and also Senator Kamala Harris interrupting Senator Grassley's opening statement. The hearings were delayed by one hour because of procedural questions by Harris, Cory Booker and others, who called for a delay in the proceedings because of the last-minute release by former president George W. Bush's lawyer of 42,000 pages of documents from Kavanaugh's service under then-president Bush. Senate Minority Leader Chuck Schumer called for a delay prior to the proceedings saying that, "Not a single senator will be able to review these records before tomorrow to delay the proceedings."

Once the hearing was underway, the nominee first listened to senators’ opening statements before being formally introduced by the testimony of former Secretary of State Condoleezza Rice, Senator Rob Portman, and liberal appellate attorney Lisa Blatt. Kavanaugh then read his own statement, in which he praised his parents, his daughters, his favorite sports teams, and professed that "I'm not a pro-prosecution or pro-defense judge. I am a pro-law judge."

The Capitol Police reported that 17 protestors were arrested in the first hour of the hearing. Linda Sarsour was one of the first in line for the hearing and was one of the first to be arrested. Ultimately, 70 people were arrested that day. Altogether, at least 227 protestors were arrested over the course of the four-day hearing, with most being charged with disorderly conduct, crowding or obstructing with fines paid between $35 – $50 USD. Senator Orrin Hatch said, "These people are so out of line they shouldn't even be allowed in the doggone room." His statements were echoed by President Trump who expressed concern over "...why don't they take care of a situation like that..." and "I think it's embarrassing for the country to allow protestors, you don't even know which side the protestors were on."

=== September 5, 2018 ===
The second day of the hearing began with the senators asking direct questions of Kavanaugh about specific incidents, or his personal position on cases or general ideas. Members of the committee were allowed 30 minutes per individual to question the judge on his record, with key points being his judicial philosophy, Roe v. Wade, and his role in programs implemented after 9/11 by the Bush administration. Kavanaugh testified that he believed Roe was "settled as a precedent of the Supreme Court" and that Planned Parenthood v. Casey was "precedent on precedent". He explained that he "did my level best in an emergency posture" when voting to deny a detained teenager an abortion in Garza v. Hargan.

There were several contentious exchanges between Kavanaugh and Democratic senators during the day. During one, Cory Booker implied that Kavanaugh had been open to racial profiling tactics, citing an email exchange between Kavanaugh and a colleague, emails marked "committee confidential," meaning that they could not be discussed publicly. In another, Kamala Harris pointedly asked Kavanaugh if he had ever discussed the Robert Mueller investigation with anybody at the Kasowitz Benson Torres firm, that was founded by Marc Kasowitz, a former personal attorney of President Trump. Kavanaugh was reticent about answering, saying that he would need the names of people who worked there to know if he spoke with anyone about it. Harris repeated her question over and over again as Kavanaugh repeatedly evaded giving a direct answer.

Interruptions from protestors continued to be seen in the courtroom, with both Judge Kavanaugh and Senator Grassley and others speaking about the disruptions, with Grassley placing blame on the Democratic senators. According to Capitol Police officials, 73 protesters were arrested and charged for unlawful demonstrations during the day of the hearing including 66 who were removed from the hearing room.

=== September 6, 2018 ===
The third day of the hearing saw Kavanaugh answering some questions posed to him by the committee, but declining to answer others. One such refusal came when he was asked to comment on Senator Richard Blumenthal's concern over President Trump's "blatant, craven and repeated attacks" on the federal judiciary, referring specifically to then-candidate Trump's July 2016 tweet asserting that Justice Ruth Bader Ginsburg had "embarrassed all by making very dumb political statements about me. Her mind is shot – resign!"

The hearing also saw highly charged arguing between senators about whether key documents were being withheld. Cory Booker released a series of documents containing communications Kavanaugh had made while serving President Bush, including the email regarding racial profiling that Senator Booker referenced on the second day of the hearing. Senator John Cornyn accused Booker of being disruptive because he was "running for president" and threatened him with expulsion from the United States Congress. Booker responded by stating, "I understand the penalty comes with potential ousting from the Senate", and, viewing the release of emails that were marked confidential as an act of "civil disobedience", defiantly declared that this was his "I am Spartacus moment." Former president Bush's attorney later announced that he had already granted Booker's request to make the documents public the day before, and criticized Booker for "histrionics".

=== September 7, 2018 ===
On the fourth day, outside witnesses in support or dissent of Judge Kavanaugh being appointed to the Supreme Court gave testimony to the committee on their position. One such invited individual was John Dean, a former Nixon administration White House counsel, who testified against the administration during the Watergate scandal. Senators also heard from a survivor of the Stoneman Douglas High School shooting, the attorney who represented an undocumented teenager whose request for an abortion Kavanaugh was legally involved in, former law clerks, students, representatives of the American Bar Association, former U.S. solicitors general during the G. W. Bush administration and former Boston Marathon running partners.

Panel II
Witness	Association		
Paul T. Moxley	American Bar Association Standing Committee on the Federal Judiciary Chair		
John R. Tarpley	American Bar Association Standing Committee on the Federal Judiciary Principal Evaluator		
Panels III–V
Majority Witness	Association	Minority Witness	Association
Luke McCloud	Former Law Clerk	Rep. Cedric Richmond	Chairman, Congressional Black Caucus
Louisa Garry	Friends Academy	Rochelle Garza	Garza & Garza Law
Theodore Olson	Solicitor General of the United States (2001–2004)	Elizabeth Weintraub	Association of University Centers on Disabilities
Colleen E. Roh Sinzdak	Former Student	Alicia Baker	
Akhil Amar	Sterling Professor Yale Law School	Melissa Murray	New York University School of Law
A.J. Kramer	Federal Public Defender for the District of Columbia	Aalayah Eastmond	
Rebecca Taibleson	Former Law Clerk	Jackson Corbin	
Maureen Mahoney	Deputy Solicitor General of the United States (1991–1993)	Hunter Lachance	
Kenneth Christmas	MarVista Entertainment	Melissa Smith	
Monica Mastal	Basketball player's mother	John Dean	White House Counsel (1970–1973)
Paul Clement	Solicitor General of the United States (2004–2008)	Rebecca Ingber	Boston University School of Law
Adam White	Antonin Scalia Law School	Lisa Heinzerling	Georgetown University Law Center
Jennifer Mascott	Antonin Scalia Law School	Peter M. Shane	Moritz College of Law

== Sexual assault allegations ==
During the confirmation process, Kavanaugh was accused of sexually assaulting Christine Blasey Ford while they were both in high school. Ford's accusations were made public in a Washington Post report on September 16, 2018, four days before the Judiciary Committee was scheduled to vote on whether to send the Kavanaugh nomination to the Senate floor for final consideration. Several senators, including Jeff Flake and Lindsey Graham, said the committee should hear from Ford before the vote.

Kavanaugh issued a statement on September 17, denying Ford's allegations, saying he has "never done anything like what the accuser describes – to her or to anyone." In response, Trump expressed his complete confidence in Kavanaugh and stated firmly that he would not withdraw the nomination, though he did acknowledge that there could be a "little delay."

On September 17, it was announced that the nomination would not proceed until the Judiciary Committee had interviewed both Ford and Kavanaugh, who were initially scheduled to testify before the Committee on September 24. Ford was given the option of testifying before the Judiciary Committee either in public or in private. On September 20, Ford's lawyers sent a message to the committee stating that Ford was willing to testify, but on a different day. After much back and forth between Chairman Grassley and Ford, she agreed to speak to the Judiciary Committee on September 27 about the alleged incident.

On September 23, a second woman, Deborah Ramirez, accused Kavanaugh of sexual assault in 1983. Kavanaugh categorically denied the allegations made by Ford and Ramirez. On September 26, Michael Avenatti released a sworn declaration by a third woman, Julie Swetnick, who alleged another incident had occurred.

=== Allegations ===
==== Christine Blasey Ford ====
Professor Christine Blasey Ford testimony

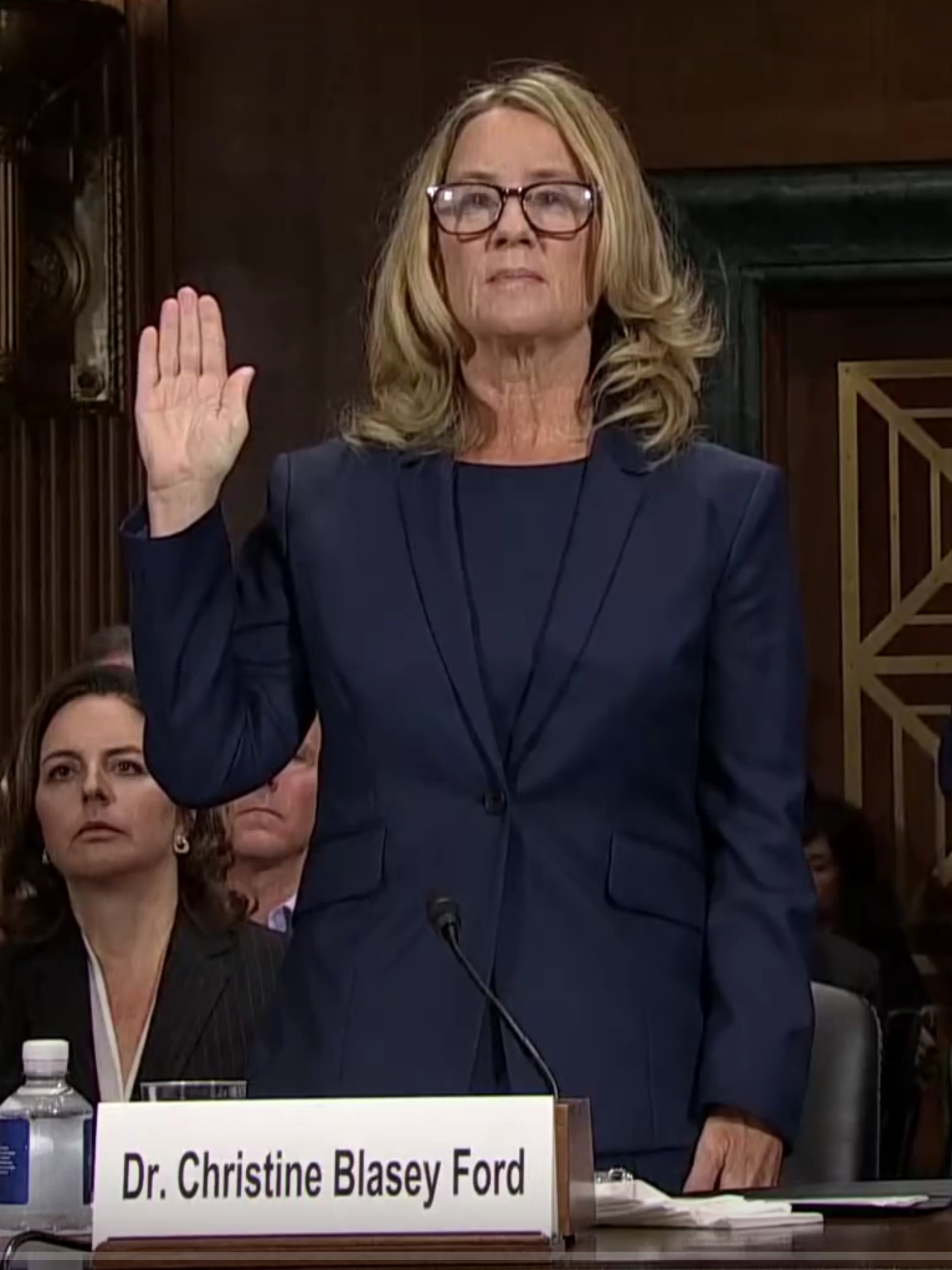
Christine Blasey Ford

Judiciary Committee Ranking Member Dianne Feinstein calls for postponement of Kavanaugh confirmation process, for FBI investigation

President Trump: Judge Brett Kavanaugh Is 'Anxious To Testify'. Video from MSNBC published on September 18, 2018

On July 30, 2018, Christine Blasey Ford wrote U.S. Senator Dianne Feinstein a letter accusing Kavanaugh of having sexually assaulted her in the 1980s. Ford requested that her allegation be kept confidential. Feinstein did not refer the allegation to the FBI until September 14, 2018, after the Judiciary Committee had completed its hearings on Kavanaugh's nomination and "after leaks to the media about [the Ford allegation] had reached a "fever pitch".

On September 16, Ford was revealed by The Washington Post to be the author of the allegations against Kavanaugh. In her report to the Post, Ford stated that in the early 1980s, when she and Kavanaugh were teenagers, Kavanaugh and his classmate Mark Judge "corralled" her in a bedroom at a party in Maryland. According to Ford, Kavanaugh pinned her to the bed, groped her, ground against her, and tried to pull off her clothes and covered her mouth when she tried to scream. Ford said that she was afraid Kavanaugh "might inadvertently kill me" during the attack. She got away when Judge jumped on the bed, knocking them all over.

Ford said she later attended couples counseling with her husband where she first talked about the incident in 2012. The therapist's notes from the time, parts of which were released on September 16, 2018, said that she had stated that she was assaulted by students "from an elitist boys' school", who eventually became "highly respected and high-ranking members of society in Washington", although the notes do not name Kavanaugh. Notes from another session a year later say that Ford had previously described a "rape attempt" while in high school. In August, Ford took a polygraph test with a former FBI agent, who concluded Ford was being truthful when she endorsed a statement summarizing her allegations as accurate. Multiple U.S. senators acquired copies of Judge's books about his time at Georgetown Preparatory School, in order to prepare for questioning of Kavanaugh and Ford before the committee.

==== Deborah Ramirez ====
On September 23, Deborah Ramirez made a second allegation against Kavanaugh relating to sexual assault. The alleged incident occurred in 1983 when Kavanaugh was 18 years old (the U.S. age of majority). Kavanaugh and Ramirez, both freshman students at Yale University, are described as joining a dorm-room party at Lawrance Hall, in Yale's "Old Campus". In The New Yorker reporting of her account, an inebriated Kavanaugh "thrust his penis in her face, and caused her to touch it without her consent as she pushed him away", before pulling his pants back up and laughing at Ramirez. The New Yorker also reported that four people that Ramirez had identified as eyewitnesses explicitly denied that Kavanaugh had been involved in the incident (2 male classmates identified by Ramirez, the wife of a third male student, and one other classmate, Dan Murphy) The New York Times reported that Ramirez contacted some of her classmates and said she could not be certain Kavanaugh was the one who exposed himself.

==== Julie Swetnick ====
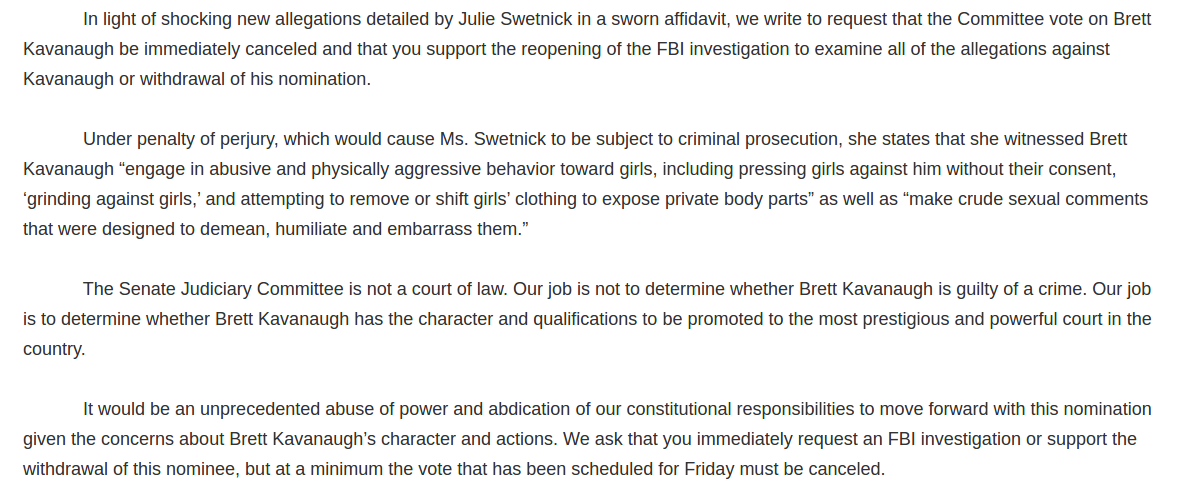
Judiciary Committee Democrats on affidavit of Julie Swetnick

A third allegation of sexual assault against Kavanaugh was announced by Michael Avenatti, the lawyer for a third woman, on September 23. On September 26, the woman, Julie Swetnick, released a sworn statement alleging that she had witnessed Kavanaugh and Mark Judge trying to get teenage girls "inebriated and disoriented so they could then be gang raped in a side room or bedroom by a 'train' of numerous boys". Swetnick also alleged Kavanaugh and Judge were both present when she was the victim of one such gang rape. Swetnick subsequently walked back the allegations. Swetnick contacted NBC News October 5 and reiterated her denial of ever seeing Kavanaugh spike punch or act inappropriately toward women, and accused Avenatti of twisting her words.

Several Democratic senators blamed Avenatti, as the Swetnick accusation "gave Republicans an opportunity to shift the narrative away from Ford's allegations and make a broader case that the growing accusations of sexual misconduct amounted to an orchestrated Democratic smear campaign". Senator Susan Collins, a Republican swing vote, called the Swetnick allegation "outlandish... [without] any credible supporting evidence", and ended up supporting Kavanaugh's nomination. Senator Gary Peters said that Avenatti's allegation "turns it into a circus atmosphere and certainly that's not where we should be", while another Senate aide said that "Democrats and the country would have been better off if Mr. Avenatti spent his time on his Iowa vanity project rather than meddling in Supreme Court fights". Avenatti fired back, criticizing anonymous Democrats as "cowards", arguing that this showed "failed leadership" in the Democratic Party.

On October 25, Judiciary Committee Chairman Chuck Grassley referred Avenatti and Swetnick for criminal investigation, claiming they made potentially false statements. Avenatti responded by tweeting that he and his client "welcome[d] the investigation."

==== Judy Munro-Leighton ====
During the hearings, another accusation of rape surfaced in a letter by "Jane Doe" from Oceanside, California, addressed to Grassley but mailed anonymously to Senator Kamala Harris on September 19. The Senate committee interrogated Kavanaugh about this claim on September 26; Kavanaugh called the accusation "ridiculous".

On November 2, 2018, Grassley announced that a woman named Judy Munro-Leighton, from Kentucky, had come forward by e-mail on October 3 as the anonymous accuser, and admitted that her accusations were fabricated. When committee staff managed to talk with her on November 1, Munro-Leighton changed her story, denying that she had penned the anonymous letter while stating that she had contacted Congress as "a ploy" in order to "get attention". She was referred to the Department of Justice and FBI for making false accusations and obstructing justice.

=== Support for parties involved and investigation ===
==== Kavanaugh ====
Kavanaugh letter to Judiciary Committee chairman Grassley, after second allegation of sexual assault

During a cabinet meeting regarding the National Council for the American Worker, President Trump commented on the initial sexual assault allegation against Brett Kavanaugh for the first time on September 17, 2018, saying, "Judge Kavanaugh is one of the finest people that I've ever known. He's an outstanding intellect, an outstanding judge, respected by everybody. Never had even a little blemish on his record. The FBI has, I think, gone through a process six times with him over the years, where he went to higher and higher positions. He is somebody very special."

Patrick J. Smyth, who attended the same school and graduated in 1983 with Kavanaugh released a statement concerning the allegations. "I understand that I have been identified by Dr. Christine Blasey Ford as the person she remembers as 'PJ' who supposedly was present at the party she described in her statements to the Washington Post," Smyth says in his statement to the Senate Judiciary Committee. "I am issuing this statement today to make it clear to all involved that I have no knowledge of the party in question; nor do I have any knowledge of the allegations of improper conduct she has leveled against Brett Kavanaugh." Ford did not actually identify or name Smyth in connection to the party in her public account.

On September 20, at a Las Vegas rally, Trump again strongly endorsed Kavanaugh, stating that "Brett Kavanaugh is one of the finest human beings you will ever have the privilege of knowing or meeting." Trump also responded to Democrats' insistence upon an FBI probe by asking why the FBI wasn't notified of the alleged attack, 36 years ago. He added, "So we'll let it play out, and I think everything is going to be just fine. This is a high-quality person." That same day, Politico reported that former Democratic staffer Ricki Seidman is serving as an adviser to Ford; Seidman had previously assisted in prepping Anita Hill in her testimony against Clarence Thomas. Her involvement was criticized by Cassie Smedile, press secretary for the Republican National Committee who stated "If you're concerned about an appearance of partisanship, hiring a Democratic operative with a history of smearing conservative judges doesn't exactly mitigate that." Kavanaugh retained litigator Beth Wilkinson to assist in his preparation. At another rally on October 2, Trump mocked the testimony of Ford, specifically the gaps in her memory about the assault and that her accusation had left a man's life in tatters.

A YouGov/The Economist poll on September 23–25 found 55% of Republicans thought he should be confirmed even if the allegations of sexual assault were true, compared to 28% of the whole sample and 13% of Democrats.

==== Accusers ====
On September 19, Ford's schoolmate Cristina King Miranda stated on a Facebook post that while she did not attend the party where the alleged incident happened, she did hear an incident regarding Ford being discussed at their school. However, in a later interview, she stated "That it happened or not, I have no idea." It was also reported that as a result of the allegations, Trump's daughter Ivanka had told her father she would not support Kavanaugh's nomination.

On September 21, actress and author Patti Davis, the daughter of Ronald Reagan, wrote an op-ed supporting Ford. Davis writes how she herself was sexually assaulted around 40 years earlier by an unnamed famous music executive, and that she "never told anyone for decades", not even her husband, due to shame over her own inaction to stop the assault. Davis explained the gaps in Ford's memories with her own experience of "how memory works in a traumatic event" – the haunting memory of the actual sexual assault remained with Davis even while the other details of the event were forgotten.

On September 24, Yale Law School students staged a sit-in at the law school in protest against the nomination of Kavanaugh, with some professors canceling classes to accommodate the sit-in and not penalize the students.

==== Investigation ====
On September 18, 2018, Anita Hill penned an op-ed for The New York Times in which she compared her accusations of sexual harassment against Clarence Thomas in 1991 to the accusations against Kavanaugh. In it, she wrote, "That the Senate Judiciary Committee still lacks a protocol for vetting sexual harassment and assault claims that surface during a confirmation hearing suggests that the committee has learned little from the Thomas hearing, much less the more recent #MeToo movement." She advocated for improvements to the ways in which these accusations are handled, and wrote, "The details of what that process would look like should be guided by experts who have devoted their careers to understanding sexual violence. The job of the Senate Judiciary Committee is to serve as fact-finders, to better serve the American public, and the weight of the government should not be used to destroy the lives of witnesses who are called to testify." Senator Orrin Hatch, who had previously spoken out against Hill in 1991 (saying "There are a lot of things that just don't make sense to me about Anita Hill's testimony. Some of it just doesn't square with what I think is basic reality and common sense") also spoke out against Ford in 2018, saying that her recollection of events was "mixed up".

On September 20, it was revealed that more than 1,000 alumnae of Ford's high school from between the 1940s and present day had signed a letter in support of Ford's call for a "thorough and independent investigation" before she testifies before the Senate Judiciary Committee. The letter also stated that the school has a long history of similar incidents. These signatories also stated that they were "survivors" who either heard about or experienced sex abuse at the school.

=== September 27, 2018 ===
Part 1: 'Brett Kavanaugh and Christine Blasey Ford testify before the Senate Judiciary Committee'. Video from Voice of America.

Part 2: 'Brett Kavanaugh and Christine Blasey Ford testify before the Senate Judiciary Committee'. Video from Voice of America.

The additional hearing on sexual abuse allegations featured just two witnesses: Kavanaugh and Ford, who were separately questioned. Republican members of the committee said they would not question the witnesses directly and instead enlisted Rachel Mitchell, a Phoenix sex crimes prosecutor, to question the witnesses on their behalf. Mitchell questioned Ford in five-minute segments, alternating with five-minute segments from the Democratic members of the committee. Mitchell did not question Kavanaugh, as most of the Republicans took back their time and used it to defend Kavanaugh.

The session began with statements by Republican Senator Grassley and Democratic Senator Feinstein. Ford began by describing the events leading up to the incident. She said that she and Kavanaugh had mutual friends while in school, and, in the summer of 1982, she and her friend Leland Keyser wound up attending a small gathering of Kavanaugh's friends, including Mark Judge, Patrick "PJ" Smyth and another boy whose name she did not recall. She stated that Kavanaugh and Judge were visibly drunk when she arrived. During the gathering, Ford said she was pushed into a bedroom by Judge and Kavanaugh before Kavanaugh pinned her down to the bed and aggressively groped and attempted to unclothe her. Ford said she was eventually able to escape and recalled Kavanaugh and Judge laughing as she fled. She stated that she felt ashamed afterwards and kept quiet about the assault until a couples counseling session in 2012. She said the assault had been "seared into my memory and haunted me episodically as an adult" and said that she felt it was her civic duty to testify.

Democrats entered into the record thousands of letters of support for Ford from her former classmates, other alumni, colleagues, students, mentors and 50 Yale Law School faculty members. They also noted that Ford passed a polygraph test, although polygraph tests are not generally admissible in court under these circumstances. Mitchell asked a number of probing questions, including if Ford had anything to drink or was on any medication during the gathering and if she was given tips before taking the polygraph test. She also contrasted Ford's record of flying with her stated fear of flying. In a subsequent memorandum reviewing Ford's allegations that was sent to all members of the Senate Republican Conference, Mitchell stated that she "[did] not think that a reasonable prosecutor would bring this case based on the evidence before the Committee. Nor do I believe that this evidence is sufficient to satisfy the preponderance-of-the-evidence standard." In the months following her testimony, Ford was inundated with death threats that forced her to flee her home and made her unable to return to work. She additionally hired private security.

Kavanaugh denied the allegations "immediately, categorically and unequivocally." He said that Ford's friend Keyser had no recollection of the incident and to "think about that." Keyser, a Democrat, stated that she believed Ford's allegation but never corroborated any details of Ford's account, saying she could not remember the incident. Keyser later stated that she no longer believed Ford's account, and was pushed into initially supporting Ford's allegations due to pressure from Ford's friends. Kavanaugh furiously condemned the Democrats for criticizing his record and called the confirmation process a "national disgrace" that had "ruined my good name." He spoke extensively about his schooling, where he "focused on academics and athletics, going to church every Sunday at Little Flower, working on my service projects, and friendship with my fellow classmates and friendship with girls from the local all-girls Catholic schools."

Democrats brought up Kavanaugh's high school yearbook page, which boasted of "Keg City Club (Treasurer)—100 Kegs or Bust" and referenced Mark Judge's memoir: Wasted: Tales of a GenX Drunk When asked about his drinking habits by Senator Amy Klobuchar, Kavanaugh said he "liked beer" and asked if she had a drinking problem before denying having one himself. However, two of his Yale classmates told CNN that he did indeed have a drinking problem, with one describing Kavanaugh as a "stumbling drunk." Democrats further questioned Kavanaugh about the terms "boofed" and "devil's triangle" in his yearbook page, which Kavanaugh said referred to flatulence and a drinking game, respectively.

Republican Senator Lindsey Graham decried Kavanaugh as a victim of "the most unethical sham" he had seen in his time in politics, claiming that if Kavanaugh was looking for fair process, he had "c[o]me to the wrong town at the wrong time" and comparing Kavanaugh's experience to "hell". A CNN commentator characterized Graham's speech as an "audition" for Attorney General.

During the day, an estimated 1,200-plus protesters streamed into Senate office buildings on Capitol Hill, mostly in support of Ford. Afterward, the Judiciary Committee announced that the committee would vote on the nomination the following day, September 28.

=== Supplemental FBI investigation ===
Avatar of Sarah Sanders

Sarah Sanders
(@PressSec)
tweeted:

Statement from President @realDonaldTrump: “I’ve ordered the FBI to conduct a supplemental investigation to update Judge Kavanaugh’s file. As the Senate has requested, this update must be limited in scope and completed in less than one week.”

September 28, 2018

Following the Judiciary Committee's vote to send the Kavanaugh nomination to the full senate with a "favorable" recommendation, Jeff Flake called for a one-week delay to the vote to allow for a brief FBI investigation into the misconduct allegations against Kavanaugh; he went so far as to say that his floor vote ("yes") would be contingent on such a probe. Several other senators, including Republicans Lisa Murkowski and Susan Collins along with Democrat Joe Manchin, voiced their support for the proposal. Dianne Feinstein, the senior Democrat on the committee, who along with Chris Coons had been advocating for an FBI investigation, supported the proposal, calling it "the best way to ensure a fair process to both Kavanaugh and Ford." In response, the president opened up a "limited" investigation into the accusations.

On September 29, it was reported that the FBI was looking into the second allegations and had contacted Ramirez. On September 30, it was confirmed that the FBI had spoken to her. On October 1, The New York Times reported that the FBI had communicated with all four people whom the White House had directed it to interview. Other individuals have spoken to the FBI about the case, such as a classmate of Kavanaugh's from Yale, detailing claims of "violent drunken behavior by Kavanaugh in college" and claims that Kavanaugh lied about the extent of his drinking during the hearing.

Also on September 29, NBC News reported that the White House had set several strict parameters for the investigation; these included heavy restrictions on investigating Mark Judge (including blocking any access to Judge's employment records) and limiting the investigation to looking into only Ford's and Ramirez's allegations; looking into Swetnick's was blocked. This report led to widespread controversy; Avenatti responded by calling the report "outrageous" and vowing to "take the facts to the American people" if Swetnick was not included in the investigation.

In response, the president denied the report, stating "I want them to interview whoever they deem appropriate, at their discretion". The White House followed up on this by stating that it was not restricting the investigation but that the investigation should not become a "fishing expedition". However, on September 30, it was confirmed by The New York Times that the restrictions were still in effect due to the parameters set by White House counsel Don McGahn. The article also stated that the investigation had been restricted to only 4 individuals that could be interviewed: Judge, Ramirez, Leland Keyser (a friend of Ford's who allegedly also attended the party) and P. J. Smyth (another party attendee). Access was denied to Swetnick and to any of Kavanaugh's classmates who stated that he drank heavily. In response to the reports, on September 30, Feinstein called for the White House and FBI to release the scope of the investigation.

On October 1, The New York Times reported that the White House had authorized the FBI to expand its investigation and interview "anybody they want within reason". McGahn followed up on this by calling the FBI and stating that the investigation could be expanded. On interviewing Swetnick, Trump stated "It wouldn’t bother me at all. Now I don’t know all three of the accusers. Certainly I imagine they’re going to interview two. The third one I don’t know much about." Despite this, later reports continued stating that the FBI had not contacted many people due to the White House restrictions, including Ford and Kavanaugh themselves. On October 4, the White House announced that it had found no corroboration of Ford's allegation after reviewing the FBI's latest probe into Kavanaugh's past. The following day, the Senate Judiciary Committee also released a report saying that they found "no corroboration of the allegations" against Kavanaugh.

On June 30, 2021, FBI assistant director Jill C. Tyson sent a letter to Democratic senators Chris Coons and Sheldon Whitehouse, in reply to a letter that the two senators had sent the Bureau on August 1, 2019, inquiring about the supplemental background investigation of Kavanaugh. The letter was publicly released by Senator Whitehouse in late July. In it, the Tyson disclosed that the White House Counsel had never granted the Bureau the authority to unilaterally investigate the tips it received without first receiving further approval from the White House Counsel. In the letter, Tyson claimed that the FBI received 4,500 tips through the tip line it established, and that "all relevant tips" were forwarded to the Office of the White House Counsel.

Following the letter to Whitehouse and Coons, Senators Sheldon Whitehouse, Chris Coons, Dick Durbin, Patrick Leahy, Richard Blumenthal, Mazie Hirono, and Cory Booker requested additional information from FBI Director Christopher Wray on the 2018 supplemental background investigation of Kavanaugh. On July 21, 2021, the senators wrote to Wray: "The admissions in your letter corroborate and explain numerous credible accounts by individuals and firms that they had contacted the FBI with information ‘highly relevant to . . . allegations’ of sexual misconduct by Justice Kavanaugh, only to be ignored." The senators ultimately asked for an explanation as to how the tips were evaluated, what follow-up occurred for this investigation, and why the FBI purposefully did not interview key witnesses.

During Kavanaugh's confirmation process the FBI received about 4,500 tips about him, which were referred to the White House. Five years later, the FBI confirmed that it didn't investigate many such tips. When it actually followed up some, the White House curtailed the scope of the investigations. During a Senate Judiciary Committee hearing in 2022, Rhode Island Senator Sheldon Whitehouse made these inquiries of FBI Director Christopher Wray, who was appointed to that post by Trump in 2017:

"As you know, we are now entering the fourth year of a frustrating saga that began with an August 2019 letter from me and Senator Chris Coons, regarding the Kavanaugh supplemental background investigation, and I'd like to try to get that matter wrapped up. First, is it true that after Kavanaugh-related tips were separated from regular tip-line traffic, they were forwarded to White House counsel without investigation?"

Wray responded:

"I apologize in advance that it has been frustrating for you. We have tried to be clear about our process. So when it comes to the tip line, we wanted to make sure that the White House had all the information we have. So when the hundreds of calls started coming in, we gathered those up, reviewed them, and provided them to the White House."

Whitehouse asked: "Without investigation?" After a long pause, Wray answered, "We reviewed them and then provided them to..." Whitehouse interjected: "You reviewed them for purposes of separating them from tip-line traffic, but did not further investigate the ones that related to Kavanaugh, correct?" Wray confirmed that process. Whitehouse asked, "Is it also true that, in that supplemental B.I. (background investigation), the FBI took direction from the White House as to whom the FBI would question, and even what questions the FBI could ask?" Wray confirmed that process.

Kavanaugh had eighty-three ethics complaints brought against him regarding his behavior during those Supreme Court confirmation hearings. Chief Justice John Roberts appointed a special federal panel of judges to investigate them. In December 2018, the panel dismissed all the complaints, calling them "serious" but deciding that lower court judges are without any authority to investigate Supreme Court appointees.

In October 2024, White House published a final report supporting the view that the supplemental investigation was heavily curtailed by the Trump administration.

=== Political impact ===
The hearings took place within weeks of the 2018 United States elections. They were seen as galvanizing support for Republicans in certain Senate races, a phenomenon that became known as the "Kavanaugh Effect." Republican challengers did manage to unseat some Democratic incumbents, in states that Donald Trump won in 2016. Democratic senators Claire McCaskill and Joe Donnelly blamed their election losses on how their party handled Kavanaugh's hearings.

Other researchers have claimed that the effect on the election was overblown, noting that several Democratic incumbent senators in Trump 2016 states voted against Kavanaugh's confirmation but still won re-election.

== Senate votes ==
=== Judiciary committee ===
Judiciary Committee votes on the nomination, September 28, 2018. Video from Voice of America

When the Judiciary Committee convened on September 28, 2018, to deliberate on whether to send Kavanaugh's nomination to the full Senate for final approval, Richard Blumenthal made a motion to subpoena Mark Judge to testify about Christine Blasey Ford's alleged sexual assault, Saying, "He [Judge] has never been interviewed by the FBI. He has never been questioned by any member of our committee." The motion was defeated, as every Republican on the committee voted against it in a party-line vote. Following the vote, Blumenthal, along with fellow Democrats Mazie Hirono, Kamala Harris, and Sheldon Whitehouse, staged a brief walkout in protest.

Later that day, after extensive debate, the committee voted 11–10 to send the Kavanaugh nomination to the full Senate with a favorable recommendation – all Republican members voted in favor of the motion and all Democratic members voting against it. The Judiciary Committee also announced that the Senate vote on Kavanaugh's confirmation would be delayed for one week to allow for a "supplemental FBI background investigation" into the "credible allegations [of sexual misconduct] against the nominee" raised during the hearings.

=== Cloture ===
Kavanaugh needed to win a simple majority vote of the full Senate to be confirmed. Republicans held 51 seats in the 100-seat Senate at the time, and, if needed, could count on the tie-breaking vote of Vice President Pence, acting in his Constitutional capacity as President of the Senate.

On October 5, the Senate voted 51–49 for cloture; a procedural vote that brought debate to end and allowed the Senate to move forward on the Kavanaugh nomination. The vote was almost entirely along party lines, with the exception of Democrat Joe Manchin, who voted yes, and Republican Lisa Murkowski, who voted no.

For many years, in order for a cloture motion on a Supreme Court nomination to pass in the Senate a three-fifths super-majority vote (60 senators) was required. However, in 2017, during the Neil Gorsuch confirmation process, Senate Majority Leader Mitch McConnell invoked the so-called nuclear option, which changed the 60 votes needed for cloture to 51.

On the eve of the cloture vote, Kavanaugh published an op-ed in the Wall Street Journal saying that he might have been too emotional at times in part due to his overwhelming frustration at being wrongly accused and that there were a few things he should not have said, but that going forward he would be an independent, impartial judge.

=== Full Senate vote ===
The Senate confirmed Brett Kavanaugh to the Supreme Court as an associate justice on October 6, by a vote of 50–48. One senator, Republican Steve Daines, who supported the nomination, was absent during the vote due to his attendance that day at his daughter's wedding in Montana. Republican Lisa Murkowski, who opposed the nomination, agreed to pair her vote with Daines' by voting "present" on the nomination, (Note: Votes of "present" do not count in tallying the vote negatively or positively.) so that their two votes would be cancelled out and the balance of the vote would be retained, while registering her opposition in the Congressional Record. All other Republicans voted to approve the nomination, and all Democrats voted in opposition, except Joe Manchin who voted to approve the nomination.

Kavanaugh's confirmation vote was historically close. In terms of actual votes, the only Supreme Court confirmation vote that was closer was the vote on Thomas Stanley Matthews, nominated by President James A. Garfield in 1881. Matthews was confirmed by the margin of a single vote, 24–23; no other justice has been confirmed by a single vote. However, in percentage terms, Kavanaugh's vote was even closer than Matthews'. Matthews was supported by 51.06% of the senators voting, but Kavanaugh only got 51.02% of the vote.

Vote to confirm the Kavanaugh nomination
October 6, 2018	Party			Total vote
October 6, 2018	Democratic	Republican	Independent	Total vote
Yea	1	49	0	50 (51.02%)
Nay	46	0	2	48 (48.98%)
Result: Confirmed
Roll call vote on the nomination: Senator / Party / State / Vote; Lamar Alexander / R / Tennessee / Yea; Tammy Baldwin / D / Wisconsin / Nay; John Barrasso / R / Wyoming / Yea; Michael Bennet / D / Colorado / Nay; Richard Blumenthal / D / Connecticut / Nay; Roy Blunt / R / Missouri / Yea; Cory Booker / D / New Jersey / Nay; John Boozman / R / Arkansas / Yea; Sherrod Brown / D / Ohio / Nay; Richard Burr / R / North Carolina / Yea; Maria Cantwell / D / Washington / Nay; Shelley Moore Capito / R / West Virginia / Yea; Ben Cardin / D / Maryland / Nay; Tom Carper / D / Delaware / Nay; Bob Casey Jr. / D / Pennsylvania / Nay; Bill Cassidy / R / Louisiana / Yea; Susan Collins / R / Maine / Yea; Chris Coons / D / Delaware / Nay; Bob Corker / R / Tennessee / Yea; John Cornyn / R / Texas / Yea; Catherine Cortez Masto / D / Nevada / Nay; Tom Cotton / R / Arkansas / Yea; Mike Crapo / R / Idaho / Yea; Ted Cruz / R / Texas / Yea; Steve Daines / R / Montana / Absent; Joe Donnelly / D / Indiana / Nay; Tammy Duckworth / D / Illinois / Nay; Dick Durbin / D / Illinois / Nay; Mike Enzi / R / Wyoming / Yea; Joni Ernst / R / Iowa / Yea; Dianne Feinstein / D / California / Nay; Deb Fischer / R / Nebraska / Yea; Jeff Flake / R / Arizona / Yea; Cory Gardner / R / Colorado / Yea; Kirsten Gillibrand / D / New York / Nay; Lindsey Graham / R / South Carolina / Yea; Chuck Grassley / R / Iowa / Yea; Kamala Harris / D / California / Nay; Maggie Hassan / D / New Hampshire / Nay; Orrin Hatch / R / Utah / Yea; Martin Heinrich / D / New Mexico / Nay; Heidi Heitkamp / D / North Dakota / Nay; Dean Heller / R / Nevada / Yea; Mazie Hirono / D / Hawaii / Nay; John Hoeven / R / North Dakota / Yea; Cindy Hyde-Smith / R / Mississippi / Yea; Jim Inhofe / R / Oklahoma / Yea; Johnny Isakson / R / Georgia / Yea; Ron Johnson / R / Wisconsin / Yea; Doug Jones / D / Alabama / Nay; Tim Kaine / D / Virginia / Nay; John Neely Kennedy / R / Louisiana / Yea; Angus King / I / Maine / Nay; Amy Klobuchar / D / Minnesota / Nay; Jon Kyl / R / Arizona / Yea; James Lankford / R / Oklahoma / Yea; Patrick Leahy / D / Vermont / Nay; Mike Lee / R / Utah / Yea; Joe Manchin / D / West Virginia / Yea; Ed Markey / D / Massachusetts / Nay; Claire McCaskill / D / Missouri / Nay; Mitch McConnell / R / Kentucky / Yea; Bob Menendez / D / New Jersey / Nay; Jeff Merkley / D / Oregon / Nay; Jerry Moran / R / Kansas / Yea; Lisa Murkowski / R / Alaska / Present; Chris Murphy / D / Connecticut / Nay; Patty Murray / D / Washington / Nay; Bill Nelson / D / Florida / Nay; Rand Paul / R / Kentucky / Yea; David Perdue / R / Georgia / Yea; Gary Peters / D / Michigan / Nay; Rob Portman / R / Ohio / Yea; Jack Reed / D / Rhode Island / Nay; Jim Risch / R / Idaho / Yea; Pat Roberts / R / Kansas / Yea; Mike Rounds / R / South Dakota / Yea; Marco Rubio / R / Florida / Yea; Bernie Sanders / I / Vermont / Nay; Ben Sasse / R / Nebraska / Yea; Brian Schatz / D / Hawaii / Nay; Chuck Schumer / D / New York / Nay; Tim Scott / R / South Carolina / Yea; Jeanne Shaheen / D / New Hampshire / Nay; Richard Shelby / R / Alabama / Yea; Tina Smith / D / Minnesota / Nay; Debbie Stabenow / D / Michigan / Nay; Dan Sullivan / R / Alaska / Yea; Jon Tester / D / Montana / Nay; John Thune / R / South Dakota / Yea; Thom Tillis / R / North Carolina / Yea; Pat Toomey / R / Pennsylvania / Yea; Tom Udall / D / New Mexico / Nay; Chris Van Hollen / D / Maryland / Nay; Mark Warner / D / Virginia / Nay; Elizabeth Warren / D / Massachusetts / Nay; Sheldon Whitehouse / D / Rhode Island / Nay; Roger Wicker / R / Mississippi / Yea; Ron Wyden / D / Oregon / Nay; Todd Young / R / Indiana / Yea; Sources:

Following Kavanaugh's confirmation, protesters began singing, "We Shall Not Be Moved," outside the capitol. Also, a throng of protesters pushed past a police line, storming up steps to pound on the doors of the U.S. Supreme Court.

== Swearing-in ceremony ==
Retired Associate Justice Anthony M. Kennedy administers the Judicial Oath to Justice Kavanaugh in front of his family and President Trump

Hours after his Senate confirmation, Kavanaugh was sworn in at a private ceremony, followed by a public ceremony in the White House on October 7. Chief Justice John Roberts administered the constitutional oath and retired Justice Anthony Kennedy administered the judicial oath. Also in attendance were officials that had supported Kavanaugh's nomination, the justice's wife, children and parents and four of the sitting Judges, while three were unable to attend due to previous engagements. In the past public swearing-in ceremonies have taken place once the newly placed justice's work is well underway rather than before their first official day on the bench.

President Trump spoke thanking those in attendance and then apologized to Kavanaugh and his family for "the terrible pain and suffering you have been forced to endure", calling the Senate hearing "a campaign of political and personal destruction based on lies and deception."

Justice Kavanaugh spoke thanking his family, friends, and those that had supported his nomination. He thanked President Trump for his "steadfast and unwavering support" and several Republican senators, including Majority Leader Mitch McConnell and Senator Susan Collins, who cast what was considered the deciding vote in his favor. He also thanked the only Democrat who voted for him, Sen. Joe Manchin III of West Virginia. He closed saying, "As a Justice on the Supreme Court, I will always strive to preserve the Constitution of the United States and the American rule of law."

== Ethics complaints filed against Kavanaugh ==
Multiple ethics complaints were filed against Kavanaugh during his confirmation hearings, 83 in all. The first two were filed in the U.S. Court of Appeals for the D.C. Circuit Court during the hearings by the Super PAC Democratic Coalition. The first on September 10, accused Kavanaugh of lying when he told the Senate Judiciary Committee he was unaware that he received information stolen from Senate Democrats when he was working in the Bush White House in the early 2000s; the second on September 27, alleging that Kavanaugh violated the judiciary's code of conduct by 'engaging in a public and partisan campaign of lies to cover-up and conceal sexual misconduct and crimes he committed in the past.'

On October 10, Chief Justice John Roberts appointed judges from the 10th Circuit Court of Appeals to address the complaints. In December 2018, the judicial panel dismissed all 83 ethics complaints, concluding that while the complaints "are serious," there is no existing authority that allows lower court judges to investigate or discipline Supreme Court justices.

== See also ==
- Nomination and confirmation to the Supreme Court of the United States
- Senate Judiciary Committee reviews of nominations to the Supreme Court of the United States
- Donald Trump Supreme Court candidates
