= Wasted: Tales of a GenX Drunk =

1997 memoir by Mark Judge

- Author: Mark Gauvreau Judge
- Subject: Alcoholism; Binge drinking Hookup culture
- Genre: Memoir
- Publisher: Hazelden
- Publication date: 1997
- Publication place: United States
- Media type: Hardcover
- Pages: 259
- ISBN: 978-1568381428
- OCLC: 36458263
- Followed by: If It Ain't Got That Swing (2000)

Wasted: Tales of a GenX Drunk is a 1997 memoir about alcoholism, binge drinking, and hookup culture at Georgetown Preparatory School, written by Mark Judge. Judge recounts his early formative experiences growing up in suburbs of Washington, D.C. under Catholic school education. The author describes his secondary education at Georgetown Preparatory School as filled with heavy drinking and experiences of teenage alcoholism. The book criticizes Alcoholics Anonymous for its lack of acknowledgement of physiological causes of alcoholism as a disease process.

Prior to authoring Wasted, Judge was a journalist and freelance writer in Washington, D.C., briefly teaching at Georgetown University. He explained his writing process behind the work on Wasted, saying he wanted to create a frank and comedic book about alcoholism. He observed that authors of prior recovery coaching books took pity upon themselves, and he wanted to make a book devoid of complaining so as to appeal to Generation X.

Wasted was reviewed by several publications, including The New York Times, Buffalo News, The Washington Times, and Psychiatric Services. The New York Times characterized Judge's book as a "naive and earnest" work about alcoholism. Buffalo News said the book had, "the drama of a made-for-television movie". The Washington Times commented that the author had been motivated by loneliness. Mother Jones placed Judge's work within the genre of books about teenage alcoholism.

Wasted received increased attention in 2018 during the Brett Kavanaugh Supreme Court nomination, in the wake of statements by psychologist Christine Blasey Ford that implicated Brett Kavanaugh and Mark Judge in possible sexual assault. Demand for Judge's work significantly increased after reporting by The Washington Post on his books and the statements by Ford. Washington Monthly and Arkansas Times concluded that "Bart O'Kavanaugh" in Wasted was likely a reference to Brett Kavanaugh.

== Summary ==
Wasted: Tales of a Gen-X Drunk is a memoir of the author's experiences with alcoholism. The author takes a cynical view towards Alcoholics Anonymous. He describes his early life growing up in relative suburbia in the state of Maryland, close to Washington, D.C. He recounts attending Catholic educational institutions where drinking alcohol was socially acceptable at a young age. Judge's behavior led to clashes with both the priests and the nuns at his Catholic schools. Judge engages in theft of school supplies from nuns. The author impersonates priests by wearing their attire. Alcoholic behavior was easy to maintain while his parents were absent from his life both by being away from the primary domicicle, and by being inattentive to their son.

The author describes how his father would drink alcohol every day, which had a negative impact on him. He paradoxically maintained a view in his youth that alcoholism was not a condition influenced by role-models, and at the same time tried to seek his father's approval. Judge relates how he felt after his first ever alcoholic drink, at the age of 14. This initial alcoholic experience at such a young age took place in Rehoboth Beach, Delaware, at the beach house of a peer of Judge's. He says he experienced a "warm cocoon of oceanic bliss", where he felt what he viewed as a physiological response of pleasure. He developed a taste for alcohol, and his drink of choice was beer. Judge reflects that he did not realize the addiction and development of alcoholism that he was manifesting at the time, writing, "Only years later would I understand what was happening." He subsequently admits that he had indeed become an alcoholic himself. By the time Judge had turned 15, he and a friend provided falsified identification for the purchase of alcohol to his fellow students at a secondary education Catholic institution. Judge writes that at age 15 a friend of his who worked as a bartender regularly supplied him with alcoholic beverages for consumption.

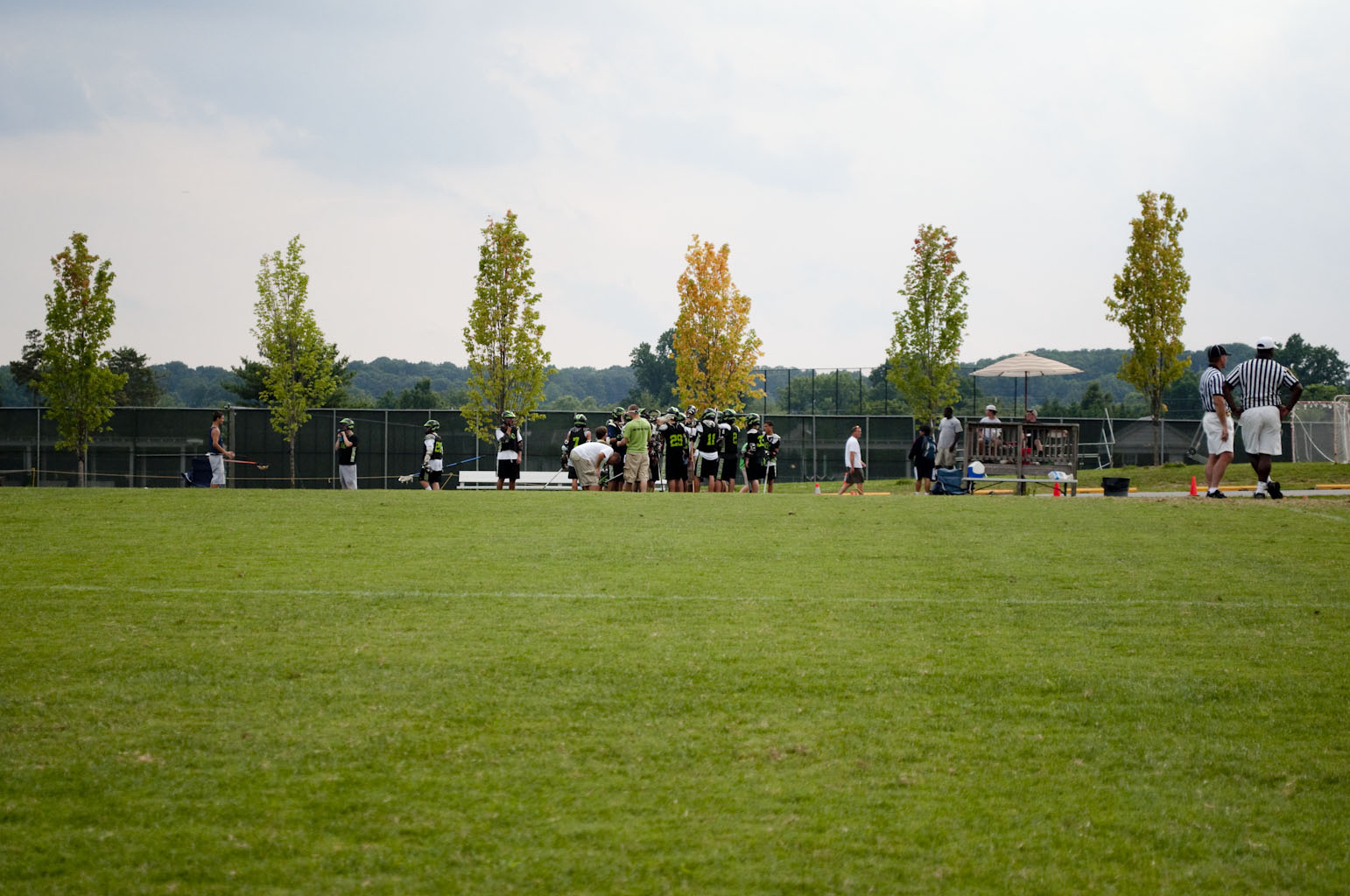
Georgetown Preparatory School in 2009

Wasted describes in detail the author's secondary education memories, particularly those involving heavy alcohol usage by his peers and himself at Georgetown Preparatory School. The author writes that the social environment of his peers at the school was, "positively swimming in alcohol". Judge recounts a hookup culture involving binge drinking, especially during a period of time at the school known as "Beach Week". Judge defined "Beach Week" at Georgetown Preparatory School as a "week-long bacchanalia of drinking and sex, or at least attempts at sex". The author discusses a phrase, "100 Kegs Or Bust", in relation to excessive alcohol drinking during his times at Georgetown Preparartory School. Judge remembers a student he refers to as Bart O'Kavanaugh who passed out and threw up in a car. The author recounts going to drink alcohol with his friends at bars for many evenings in a row. He presents in-depth memories of orgies and attempts to have sex fueled with alcohol at residences along the beach shoreline.

Judge recounts episodes of heavy drinking and blackouts during his four years of study at Catholic University of America. The author is able to graduate from university in spite of heavy alcohol use. Judge acknowledges in the book that in his later twenties, he regularly blacked out while drunk, and awoke in locations with no memory of having arrived there. The author describes a panic attack episode at a wedding of a peer, which brought him to the realization that he needed to stop drinking alcoholic beverages. He tried going to Alcoholics Anonymous for the first time, in January 1993. After quitting drinking, Judge recounts suffering from a significant amount of depression. Judge argues in the book that alcoholism is a disease process, and compares it to opiate and heroin. He brings forth research in the book attempting to demonstrate that the brain and liver of alcoholics predispose them to addictive tendencies not seen in otherwise healthy and normative humans. Alcoholics Anonymous is criticized repeatedly in the book, due to its reliance upon psychological themes to combact alcoholism. The author criticizes Alcoholics Anonymous for not emphasizing physiological and biochemical causes of alcoholism.

== Composition and publication ==
Prior to writing Wasted, Judge had worked as a journalist and freelance writer in the Washington, D.C. area. Judge briefly taught at Georgetown University but left in the 1990s. Regarding the specific writing process and motivation for Wasted, the author denied it had anything to do with a desire to make excuses for his prior alcoholic lifestyle. Judge said, "I wanted the book to be very funny and to put the blame on myself." He explained the appeal of his book to those of his generation, as differentiated from other books in the same genre, "A lot of recovery books are very 'poor me.' GenXers are tired of hearing other Xers whine."

Wasted was first published by Hazelden in hardcover format in 1997, and designed by Craig Davidson of Civic Design. An eBook was released by the same publisher in the same year. After the publication of Wasted, Judge went on to author a second book about his time at Georgetown Preparatory School. Judge published God and Man at Georgetown Prep in 2005. The memoir detailed how he published the school's underground newspaper which had information on wild parties.

== Critical reception ==
The New York Times called it a "naive and earnest" book about alcoholism and criticized the juvenile writing style of the book, concluding, "In the end, Wasted does stand as a cautionary tale – not necessarily for alcoholics, but for anyone who wants to write about alcoholism."

The Buffalo News reviewed the book, writing, "Mark Gauvreau Judge's memoir of his 'toxic addiction' to alcohol has all the drama of a made-for-television movie." The book review called Judge's work indulgent and disorganized, concluding, "What we really have is a sentimental tale of arrested development and a longing for the days when we still could drink with our Catholic school buddies."

The Washington Times reviewed the book, and commented upon the author's state of mind, "All Mark Judge knew was how loneliness pounded inside his head like an unforgiving hammer." Judge's work was the subject of a book review in the academic journal, Psychiatric Services. Mother Jones commented upon the book, placing it within the genre of memoirs about alcoholism experienced during adolescence, "Like many works of the genre, it devotes a lot of ink to the kinds of debauchery that leads to Alcoholics Anonymous and recovery."

Wasted received increased attention in 2018 during the Brett Kavanaugh Supreme Court nomination, in the wake of statements by psychologist Christine Blasey Ford that implicated Brett Kavanaugh and Mark Judge in possible sexual assault. Judge wrote to the U.S. Senate to say he had "no memory" of the incident described by Ford. Judge said he did not wish to testify. Wasted and the author's subsequent book about the same educational institution, God and Man at Georgetown Prep, were highlighted in The Washington Post after the statements by Ford. Multiple U.S. Senators acquired copies of Judge's books on his time with Kavanaugh at Georgetown Preparatory School, to prepare for questioning of Kavanaugh and Ford before the United States Senate Committee on the Judiciary. Both the demand for Judge's work in light of the comments by Ford, in addition to the reporting by The Washington Post, drove renewed interest in works by the author about his time at Georgetown Preparatory School. Demand for Judge's subsequent book about the topic, God and Man at Georgetown Prep, drove the price of the book up to US$550 online. James Van Dyke, the president of Georgetown Preparatory School, released a public letter after reporting on Judge and Kavanaugh and the history of alcoholic drinking at the educational institution, stating he was attempting to change the culture at the school.

Analysts commented that the Bart O'Kavanaugh in Wasted was a reference to Brett Kavanaugh. Arkansas Times wrote it was "obviously a nom de plume" for Brett Kavanaugh. Mother Jones wrote "Kavanaugh appears to make an appearance in the book under the name 'Bart O’Kavanaugh'." The Associated Press wrote that in Judge's book Wasted, "he makes passing reference to someone with a strikingly similar name". Washington Monthly concluded, Judge had "inadequately anonymized Brett Kavanaugh as 'Bart O’Kavanaugh'".

On September 27, 2018, the United States Senate Committee on the Judiciary held an additional day of public hearings to discuss Ford's allegations. Ford and Kavanaugh were the only witnesses scheduled. US Senator Patrick Leahy asked Kavanaugh in the testimony about incidents of alcohol-induced blackouts and vomiting described in Wasted, referring to "Bart O'Kavanaugh" in the book. Leahy asked Kavanaugh during the US Senate testimony, "Are you the Bart O'Kavanaugh that he's referring to? Yes or no?" Kavanaugh responded, "You'd have to ask him." The day after the testimony by Kavanaugh, demand for Wasted significantly increased such that there were zero available copies online. According to The New Yorker, the "last known available copy of the memoir in the U.S. available on the Internet" was purchased the day after Kavanaugh's testimony, for US$850.00.
