= Jesse Walker =

American writer (born 1970)

Jesse Walker (born September 4, 1970), an American writer, is books editor of Reason magazine. The University of Michigan alumnus has written the books The United States of Paranoia: A Conspiracy Theory (HarperCollins, 2013) and Rebels on the Air: An Alternative History of Radio in America (NYU Press, 2001), and he maintains a blog called The Perpetual Three-Dot Column. His articles have appeared in a number of publications, including The New York Times, The Wall Street Journal, The Washington Post, The Atlantic, Salon, The New Republic, Politico, L.A. Times, L.A. Weekly, Chronicles, Boing Boing, No Depression, and the Journal of American Studies.

== Views ==
Walker's writings display a definite libertarian bent, and he has cast a protest vote for the Libertarian Party's nominee in every presidential election of his adult lifetime except one, though "more often than not, I think they've put up a terrible candidate."

=== Foreign policy ===
Walker was critical of the war on terror and opposed the Patriot Act. He has stated that it is a myth that the U.S. pursued an "isolationist" foreign policy between World War I and World War II.

=== Conspiracy Theories ===
He has identified five kinds of conspiracy theories:

- The "Enemy Outside" refers to theories based on figures alleged to be scheming against a community from without.
- The "Enemy Within" finds the conspirators lurking inside the nation, indistinguishable from ordinary citizens.
- The "Enemy Above" involves powerful people manipulating events for their own gain.
- The "Enemy Below" features the lower classes working to overturn the social order.
- The "Benevolent Conspiracies" are angelic forces that work behind the scenes to improve the world and help people.

== Selected bibliography ==
- "Every Man a Sultan: Indigenous Responses to the Somalia Crisis". Telos 103 (Spring 1995). New York: Telos Press.
