= American Heritage (magazine) =

Mainstream magazine of American history

- Cover of the Spring 2018 issue featuring United States President William McKinley
- Editor-in-chief: Edwin S. Grosvenor
- Categories: American history
- Frequency: Quarterly
- Circulation: 160,000
- Founded: 1947; 79 years ago
- Final issue: 2013 (print; relaunched digitally in 2017)
- Company: American Heritage Publishing Company
- Country: United States
- Based in: Rockville, Maryland
- Language: English
- Website: www.americanheritage.com
- ISSN: 0002-8738

American Heritage is a magazine dedicated to covering the history of the United States for a mainstream readership. Until 2007, the magazine was published by Forbes. Since that time, Edwin S. Grosvenor has been its editor and publisher. Print publication was suspended early in 2013, but the magazine relaunched in digital format with the Summer 2017 issue after a Kickstarter campaign raised $31,203 from 587 backers. The 70th Anniversary issue of the magazine (Winter 2020) on the subject "What Makes America Great?" includes essays by such historians as Fergus Bordewich, Douglas Brinkley, Joseph Ellis, and David S. Reynolds.

== History ==
From 1947 to 1949 the American Association for State and Local History published a house organ, American Heritage: A Journal of Community History. In September 1949, AASLH launched the magazine with broader scope for the general public, but keeping certain features geared to educators and historical societies.

In 1954, AASLH sold the magazine to a quartet of writers and editors from Time, Inc. including James Parton, Oliver Jensen, Joseph J. Thorndike and founding editor Bruce Catton, the Pulitzer Prize-winning historian of the Civil War. They formed the American Heritage Publishing Company and introduced the hardcover, 120-page advertising-free "magazine" with Volume 6, Number 1 in December 1954. Though, in essence, an entirely new magazine, the publishers kept the volume numbering because the previous incarnation had been indexed in the Readers' Guide to Periodical Literature. Each year begins in December and continues through the following October, published every other month. For example, Volume XXV issues are December 1973, February 1974, April 1974, June 1974, August 1974, and October 1974. December 1974 begins Volume XXVI.

Bruce Catton remained with the magazine for 25 years until his death in 1979 and published over 100 essays. He warned historians against "regarding the past so fondly we are unable to get it in proper focus, and we see virtues that were not there.”

In 1964, David McCullough began his writing career as an editor and writer for American Heritage, which he sometimes calls "my graduate school". McCullough wrote numerous articles for the magazine. He turned his article for the June 1966 issue on the Johnstown Flood, Run for Your Lives, into a full-length book titled, The Johnstown Flood. When it became an unexpected bestseller, McCullough left the magazine in 1968 to commit full-time to writing. Later American Heritage articles by McCullough on the transcontinental railroad and Harry Truman also became bestselling books.

McGraw-Hill purchased the American Heritage Publishing Company in 1969. Samuel P. Reed acquired the magazine in 1978. By 1980, costs made the hardcover version prohibitive for a regular subscription. Subscribers could choose the new regular newsstand high-quality softcover or the "Collector's Edition", even plusher and thicker than the previous hardcover. Each is usually about 80 pages and has more "relevant" features and shorter articles than in the early years, but the scope and direction and purpose had not changed. Forbes bought the magazine in 1986.

On May 17, 2007, the magazine, published on a bimonthly basis, announced that it had stopped publication, at least temporarily, with the April/May 2007 issue. On October 27, 2007, Edwin S. Grosvenor, purchased the magazine from Forbes for $500,000 in cash and $10 million in subscription liabilities. Grosvenor, who serves as president and editor-in-chief, is the former editor of the fine arts magazine, Portfolio. Grosvenor was also the editor of the literary magazine, Current Books, and magazines for Marriott and Hyatt Hotels. He was also the CEO of KnowledgeMax, Inc., an online bookseller.

After suspending print publication in 2013, the magazine relaunched digitally in 2017 with a new website and subscriber management system.

== Contents ==
For a magazine that has lasted seven decades, its way of covering history has not changed much over the years. Each issue is still an collection of articles on the people, places, and events from the entire history of the United States. Today, there is mention of television shows and Web sites, and a greater diversity of articles such as Harvard professor Henry Louis Gates' 2012 article, "Growing Up Colored," about life as a young boy in segregated West Virginia.

Recent content has included a special 70th Anniversary issue on "What Makes America Great" (Winter 2020) and an issue on the history of gun control with essays by historian Joseph J. Ellis, law professor Adam Winkler, and gun rights advocate Robert A. Levy.

Some historians have criticized the magazine for what they say is a lack of seriousness. Reviewing David McCullough's book on John Adams in The New Republic, Sean Wilentz stated that during the 1950s, "[Bernard] DeVoto's style of seriousness [was] eclipsed by the more journalistic and sentimentally descriptive style of American Heritage, whose influence is everywhere." Wilentz claimed that McCullough and film maker Ken Burns followed the American Heritage style: "popular history as passive nostalgic spectacle" marching "under the banner of 'narrative'". The magazine's editor at the time, Richard Snow, replied that "this magazine has never taken an overly sentimentalized or simplistic view of the past" and that American Heritage is "a magazine addressed to a lay audience and thus it has the usual fixtures—columns, picture stories, and so forth—and a variety of topics, some of greater consequence than others... but that it publishes many historians "whose work nobody has ever called simplistic, or sentimental, or undemanding.

Numerous articles in American Heritage have later been expanded into bestselling books, including:

- Barbara W. Tuchman's three-part series on General Joseph Stilwell in 1970, beginning with "A Yankee Among The War Lords", that was later published as Stilwell and the American Experience in China, 1911-45, which won the Pulitzer Prize for General Nonfiction in 1972.
- Walter Lord's 1955 article "Maiden Voyage: The first and last trip of the 'unsinkable' Titanic", that became the bestselling A Night to Remember, which was made into a movie.
- Laura Hillenbrand's 1998 article, "Four Good Legs Between Us", that became the 2001 book, Seabiscuit: An American Legend and the 2003 film, Seabiscuit, which was nominated for the Academy Award for Best Picture.

In addition to running four to six articles, American Heritage's regular features include

- "History News" - news and happenings in museums, historic sites, movies
- "Heritage Travel" - guides to what to see in historic American areas
- "Now on the Web" - what's being written relating to history around the Web
- "Letters to the Editor" - readers' letters
- "My Brush With History" - readers' own stories about incidents in their lives that have some interesting historical significance

=== Other media ===
During the early 1960s, American Heritage sponsored a series of popular military board games produced by the Milton Bradley Company.

Beginning in 1973, and presumably as part of the then-current national lead-up to the Bicentennial, American Heritage teamed up with producer David L. Wolper for a series of four hour-long television specials (broadcast every few months between late 1973 and early 1975) based on events and people in American history, in documentary-like filmed dramatizations with actors taking the roles of historic figures, and key events re-enacted. The specials, sponsored by Texaco, were narrated by actor Cliff Robertson and broadcast on ABC.

==== The American Heritage Specials ====
- The World Turned Upside Down (George Washington and the Battle of Yorktown); originally broadcast November 27, 1973
- Lincoln: Trial by Fire (Abraham Lincoln, George McClellan and the Civil War); originally broadcast January 20, 1974
- The Yanks are Coming (General John J. Pershing and World War I); originally broadcast April 22, 1974
- The Honorable Sam Houston (Sam Houston and his failed efforts to keep Texas out of the Confederacy); originally broadcast January 22, 1975

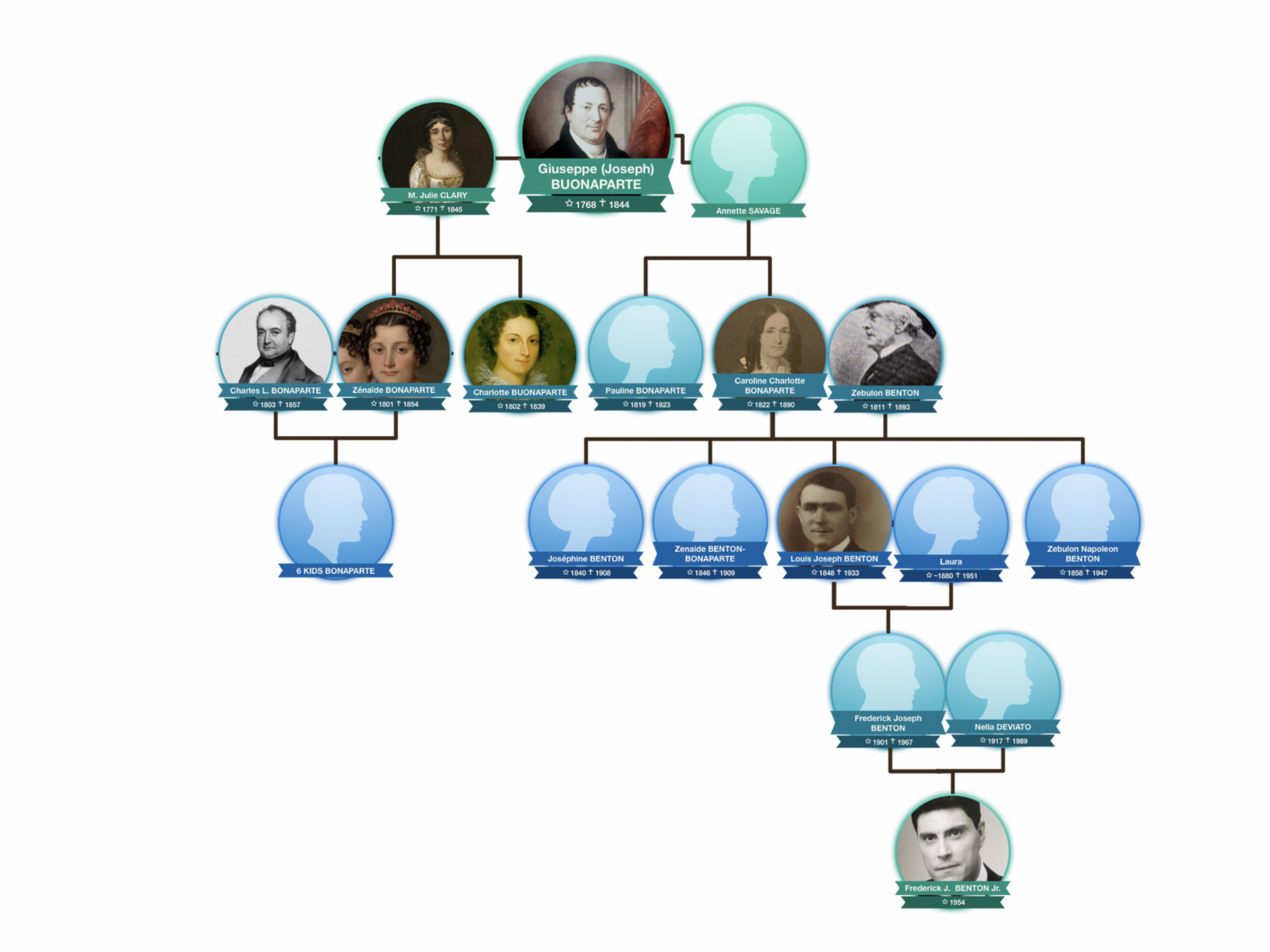
The Philadelphia descendants of former King Joseph-Napoléon Bonaparte featured in American Heritage 1970

== Editors ==
- Bruce Catton (1954–1959)
- Oliver Jensen (1959–1976)
- Alvin M. Josephy, Jr. (1976–1978)
- Geoffrey Ward (1978–1982)
- Byron Dobell (1982–1989)
- Richard Snow (1989–2007)
- Edwin S. Grosvenor (2007–present)

== Notable staff and contributors ==
- Daniel Aaron
- Elie Abel
- Dean Acheson
- Stephen Ambrose
- Cleveland Amory
- Kevin Baker
- Bernard Bailyn
- Carlos Baker
- Russell Baker
- Michael Beschloss
- David W. Blight
- Fergus Bordewich
- Alan Brinkley
- Douglas Brinkley
- Bruce Catton
- Sir Arthur C. Clarke
- Henry Steele Commager
- Malcolm Cowley
- Tom D. Crouch
- Paul Dickson
- John Dos Passos
- John Eisenhower
- Joseph Ellis
- Thomas Fleming
- James Thomas Flexner
- Eric Foner
- John A. Garraty
- Henry Louis Gates Jr.
- John Steele Gordon
- Annette Gordon-Reed
- T. A. Heppenheimer
- Harold Holzer
- Herbert Hoover
- A.E. Dick Howard
- James Horn
- Jane Kamensky
- John F. Kennedy
- Edward G. Lengel
- John Lukacs
- Gerard Magliocca
- Pauline Maier
- David McCullough
- James M. McPherson
- Peter S. Onuf
- Nathaniel Philbrick
- David S. Reynolds
- Jeffrey Rosen
- Arthur M. Schlesinger, Jr.
- Peter Schweizer
- Robert A. M. Stern
- Jean Strouse
- Alan Taylor
- Barbara Tuchman
- Steven Waldman
- Geoffrey Ward
- Bernard Weisberger
- Gordon S. Wood
- Joshua M. Zeitz

== Awards ==
American Heritage has been the finalist or winner of several National Magazine Awards, especially between 1985 and 1993:

- 1975, Finalist, National Magazine Award (Visual Excellence), Frank H. Johnson, editor
- 1985, Winner, National Magazine Award (General Excellence), Byron Dobell, editor
- 1985, Winner, National Magazine Award (Single-Topic Issue), Byron Dobell, editor
- 1986, Finalist, National Magazine Award (General Excellence), Byron Dobell, editor
- 1986, Finalist, National Magazine Award (Design), Byron Dobell, editor, Beth Whitaker, art director
- 1987, Finalist, National Magazine Award (General Excellence), Byron Dobell, editor
- 1988, Finalist, National Magazine Award (General Excellence), Byron Dobell, editor
- 1989, Winner, National Magazine Award (General Excellence), Byron Dobell, editor
- 1990, Finalist, National Magazine Award (Design), Byron Dobell, editor, Theodore Kalomirakis, art director
- 1990, Finalist, National Magazine Award (General Excellence), Byron Dobell, editor
- 1991, Finalist, National Magazine Award (General Excellence), Byron Dobell, editor
- 1993, Finalist, National Magazine Award (General Excellence), Richard F. Snow, editor
- 1999, Finalist, National Magazine Award (General Excellence), Richard F. Snow, editor

=== Samuel Eliot Morison Award ===
In 1976, the American Heritage Publishing Company founded and sponsored an award called the Samuel Eliot Morison Award, named for the historian Samuel Eliot Morison. It had the goal of annually honoring an American author whose work shows "that good history is literature as well as high scholarship." The first award was presented on September 28, 1977, by Henry A. Kissinger at the Pierpont Morgan Library, valued at $5,000. It ran for two years.

- 1976 Joseph P. Lash, Roosevelt and Churchill, 1939–1941: The Partnership That Saved the West
- 1977 David McCullough, The Path Between the Seas: The Creation of the Panama Canal, 1870-1914

== See also ==
- The American Heritage Dictionary of the English Language
- American Heritage of Invention & Technology
