= Green Tiger Press =

American publishing house

- Industry: Publishing
- Founded: 1960
- Founder: Harold Darling, Sandra Darling
- Headquarters: Seattle, Washington

Green Tiger Press was an American publishing company known for producing reproductions of illustrations from old children's books and creating children's and gift books. The company was founded by Harold and Sandra Darling in the mid-1960s.

== Early history ==
Before establishing Green Tiger Press, Harold Darling had previously set up The Sign of the Sun bookstore and The Shadow Box film theatre. Those businesses became the Unicorn Theatre and the Mithras Bookstore located in La Jolla, California. Sandra, a literature graduate who later pursued painting, designed film programs and posters for the Unicorn Theatre.

== Origins ==
Green Tiger Press started as a postcard business specializing in reproductions of out-of-print illustrations by artists such as Arthur Rackham, Edmund Dulac, Warwick Goble, Jessie Willcox Smith, and Boutet de Monvel. Sandra's suggestion to reproduce these illustrations led to a positive response, prompting the couple to move the business to larger premises and expand their offerings to include hand-tipped notecards, matted prints, and books. The press also began accepting manuscripts and commissioning artists to create books like The Book of Unicorns, which included a combination of old illustrations, newly commissioned pieces, and text written by Harold.

In 2023, the La Jolla Historical Society paid tribute to Green Tiger Press, The Unicorn Theatre, and The Mithras Bookstore in their exhibition titled 'Tigers, Unicorns, and Puppy Dog Tales'. The exhibition ran from September 23, 2023 to January 21, 2024.

== Publication history ==
Green Tiger Press published books such as All Mirrors Are Magic Mirrors, which emphasized. The press also released award-winning children's books, including The Teddy Bears' Picnic by Alexandra Day, which received recognition at the Children’s International Book Fair in Bologna, Italy. The press's popular series, The Good Dog, Carl, was based on an idea found in an old book, while 'The Night Rainbow' by Cooper Edens became one of their best-selling works.

In 1986, Green Tiger Press was acquired by Simon and Schuster. The Darlings continued with their stationery line and founded Laughing Elephant Publishing, focusing on gift books and paper products. The Darlings later reacquired Green Tiger in 2010, and the press continues to publish children's books.

== Present day ==
Chev and Benjamin Darling, the second generation of Darlings, founded Laughing Elephant Gifts and Books, respectively. Laughing Elephant Gifts, located in Seattle, Washington, specializes in unique gifts using vintage images from the Laughing Elephant and Green Tiger Press archives. Laughing Elephant Books, run by Benjamin Darling in San Diego, California, focuses on publishing children’s and gift books featuring vintage illustrations and designs from the archives.
