= Teddy Bears' Picnic (disambiguation) =

"The Teddy Bears' Picnic" is a song with melody by John Walter Bratton in 1907, and lyrics added by Jimmy Kennedy in 1932.

Teddy Bears' Picnic may also refer to:

- Teddy Bears' Picnic (film), a 2002 film by Harry Shearer
- The Teddy Bears' Picnic, 1983 book based on the song lyrics, illustrated by Alexandra Day
- The Teddy Bears' Picnic, 1989 short film, precursor to The Secret World of Benjamin Bear
- The Teddy Bears' Picnic, 1988 stage play by David Pinner
- Teddy Bears' Picnic, a festival in Winnipeg
- Teddy Bears' Picnic, part of Island Bay festival
