= Carl's Afternoon in the Park =

Book by Alexandra Day

- Author: Alexandra Day
- Language: English
- Genre: Children's literature
- Publisher: Farrar, Straus and Giroux
- Publication date: 10 May 1991
- Publication place: United States
- Media type: Print (hardback and paperback)
- ISBN: 0-374-31104-8
- Preceded by: Carl’s Christmas
- Followed by: Carl’s Masquerade

Carl's Afternoon in the Park (ISBN 0-374-31104-8) is a children's picture book by Alexandra Day. The book was copyrighted in 1991. The book is largely pictorial with text only on the very first and very last pages.

== Synopsis ==
The book starts when a woman walking in the park with her baby daughter and her rottweiler Carl run into a friend of hers. The lady's friend has with her a rottweiler puppy. The two friends decide to go off to have some tea and leave the baby alone with the rottweiler and the rottweiler pup. The book is a look at the adventures of a dog and a baby in the park. At the end of the book, the women return to express that they hope the dog and baby weren't bored after having been left alone too long.

== Reception ==
Publishers Weekly states 'Move over, Mary Poppins, and make room for Carl, the ravishing rottweiler babysitter who makes his fourth and perhaps finest appearance yet in this gorgeously colored picture book.', while Kirkus finds that 'The dogs are as charmingly true to life as ever, while the fantasy will beguile fans and worry a few literal-minded caregivers.'

== See also ==
- Good Dog, Carl
