= Cooper Edens =

American writer (born 1945)

- Born: 1945 (age 80–81); King County, Washington
- Occupations: Author, illustrator
- Writing career
- Genre: Children's books
- Notable awards: Children's Critic Award, 1980; Golden Apple Award nominee

Cooper Edens (born 1945) is an American author and illustrator of more than 25 children's books..[1] He is best known for "If You're Afraid of the Dark, Remember the Night Rainbow" and "Add One More Star to the Night". These works reflect his "horizontal" approach to storytelling. that asks the reader to solve a non-linear string of "problems" ("If you're afraid of the dark ...") rather than follow a hero or heroine through a linear progression of plot points He has also collaborated with other artists on a number of children's books and in compilations of classic children's story illustrations.

== History ==
Cooper Edens (the pen name of Gary Drager) was born and raised in the Seattle area. His parents' house, on Lake Washington, encouraged solitary daydreaming and reading. In first grade, his principal told his mother that he shouldn't return to class because he was too creative. His mom said "Good". He took a year off from school and spent much of his time with coloring books, graduating soon to channeling Monet and Van Gogh with crayons and cardboard.

Edens used that medium—crayon on cardboard—to illustrate his first words-and-art creation. He was steered by other publishers to Harold and Sandra Darling, of Green Tiger Press, who published "If You're Afraid of the Dark, Remember the Night Rainbow" in 1978. The title highlights the style: antique-looking images, colored in a luminous, impressionist style, are juxtaposed with brief, haiku-like "If ... (Then)" statements. The style found a large audience: over 1.3 million print copies of "...Night Rainbow" have been sold. Many of his works are now published by Chronicle Books.

While other books (such as "The Starcleaner Reunion", "Caretakers of Wonder" and "If You're Still Afraid of the Dark Add One More Star to the Night") use the same "horizontal" approach, Cooper has also worked with other artists on numerous collaborations. His partnership with Sandra Darling (Alexandra Day), author of the popular "Good Dog Carl" series, has produced seven books . Edens has also worked with partners to compile books that use art from the history of children's literature to retell the story, and to show how different artists create different realities for their stories. He is now working on projects to create digital, interactive versions of some of his classics.

According to Edens, he "is for infinite possibilities. If you don't like the way the world looks straight ahead, use your peripheral vision."

Edens also wrote lyrics for MerKaBa and the band White.

== Awards ==
Edens earned the Children's Critic Award in 1980 for The Starcleaner Reunion. He was also the American nominee for the Golden Apple Award (Prague) in 1983 for Caretakers of Wonder.

== List of Works ==
=== Author-Illustrator ===
1. If You're Afraid of the Dark, Remember the Night Rainbow, Green Tiger Press (San Diego, CA), 1978, 2nd edition, 1984, reprinted, Chronicle Books (New York, NY), 2002.
2. The Starcleaner Reunion, Green Tiger Press (San Diego, CA), 1979.
3. Caretakers of Wonder, Green Tiger Press (San Diego, CA) 1980.
4. With Secret Friends, Green Tiger Press (San Diego, CA), 1981.
5. Inevitable Papers, Green Tiger Press (San Diego, CA), 1982.(With others)
6. Paradise of Ads, Green Tiger Press (San Diego, CA), 1987.
7. Now Is the Moon's Eyebrow, Green Tiger Press (San Diego, CA), 1987.
8. Hugh's Hues, Green Tiger Press (San Diego, CA), 1988.
9. Nineteen Hats, Ten Teacups, an Empty Birdcage, and the Art of Longing, Green Tiger Press (San Diego, CA), 1992.
10. The Little World, Blue Lantern Books, 1994.
11. If You're Still Afraid of the Dark, Add One More Star to the Night, Simon & Schuster (New York, NY), 1998.

=== Author ===
1. Emily and the Shadow Shop, illustrated by Patrick Dowers, Green Tiger Press (San Diego, CA), 1982.
2. A Phenomenal Alphabet Book, illustrated by Joyce Eide, 1982.
3. The Prince of the Rabbits, illustrated by Felix Meroux, Green Tiger Press (San Diego, CA), 1984.
4. Santa Cows, illustrated by Daniel Lane, Green Tiger Press (San Diego, CA), 1991.
5. The Story Cloud, illustrated by Kenneth LeRoy Grant, Green Tiger Press (San Diego, CA), 1991.
6. A Present for Rose, illustrated by Molly Hashimoto, Sasquatch Books, 1993.
7. Shawnee Bill's Enchanted Five-Ride Carousel, illustrated by Daniel Lane, Green Tiger Press (San Diego, CA), 1994.
8. Santa Cow Island, illustrated by Daniel Lane, Green Tiger Press (San Diego, CA), 1994.
9. How Many Bears?, illustrated by Marjett Schille, Atheneum (New York, NY), 1994.
10. The Wonderful Counting Clock, illustrated by Kathleen Kimball, Simon & Schuster (New York, NY), 1995.
11. Santa Cow Studios, illustrated by Daniel Lane, Simon & Schuster (New York, NY), 1995.
12. Nicholi, illustrated by A. Scott Banfill, Simon & Schuster (New York, NY), 1996.(With Alexandra Day)
13. The Christmas We Moved to the Barn, illustrated by Alexandra Day, HarperCollins (New York, NY), 1997.
14. (With Alexandra Day) Taffy's Family, HarperCollins (New York, NY), 1997.
15. (With Harold Darling and Richard Kehl) Invisible Art, Blue Lantern Studio (Seattle, WA), 1999.
16. (With Daniel Lane) The Animal Mall, illustrated by Edward Miller, Dial (New York, NY), 2000.
17. (With Alexandra Day) Special Deliveries, illustrated by Alexandra Day, HarperCollins (New York, NY), 2001.

=== Illustrator ===
1. Alexandra Day, Helping the Sun, Green Tiger Press (San Diego, CA), 1987.
2. Alexandra Day, Helping the Flowers and Trees, Green Tiger Press (San Diego, CA), 1987.
3. Alexandra Day, Helping the Night, Green Tiger Press (San Diego, CA), 1987.
4. Alexandra Day, Helping the Animals, Green Tiger Press (San Diego, CA), 1987.

=== Other ===
1. (With Alexandra Day and Welleran Poltarnees) Children from the Golden Age, 1880–1930, Green Tiger Press (San Diego, CA), 1987.
2. (Compiler) The Glorious Mother Goose, illustrated by various artists, Atheneum (New York, NY), 1988.
3. (Compiler) Lewis Carroll, Alice's Adventures in Wonderland: The Ultimate Illustrated Edition, Bantam (New York, NY), 1989.
4. (Compiler) Beauty and the Beast, Green Tiger Press (New York, NY), 1989.
5. (Compiler) Goldilocks and the Three Bears, illustrated by various artists, Green Tiger Press (New York, NY), 1989.
6. (Compiler) Little Red Riding Hood, illustrated by various artists, Green Tiger Press (New York, NY), 1989.
7. (Compiler) The Glorious ABC, illustrated by various artists, Atheneum (New York, NY), 1990.
8. (Compiler) Day and Night and Other Dreams, Green Tiger Press (New York, NY), 1990.
9. (Compiler) Hansel and Gretel, illustrated by various artists, Green Tiger Press (New York, NY), 1990.
10. (Compiler) Jack and the Beanstalk, illustrated by various artists, Green Tiger Press (New York, NY), 1990.(
11. Compiler with Harold Darling) Favorite Fairy Tales, illustrated by various artists, Chronicle Books (San Francisco, CA), 1991.
12. (Compiler) The Three Princesses, illustrated by various artists, Bantam (New York, NY), 1991.
13. (With Alexandra Day and Welleran Poltarnees) An ABC of Fashionable Animals, Green Tiger Press (New York, NY), 1991.
14. (Compiler with Richard Kehl) The Flower Shop, illustrated by various artists, Blue Lantern Books (Seattle, WA), 1992.
15. (Compiler with Richard Kehl) The Heart Shop, illustrated by various artists, Blue Lantern Books (Seattle, WA), 1992.
16. (Compiler with Harold Darling), Clement Moore, The Night before Christmas, illustrated by various artists, Chronicle Books (San Francisco, CA), 1998.
17. (Compiler) Carlo Collodi, Pinocchio, illustrated by various artists, Chronicle Books (San Francisco, CA), 2001.
18. (Compiler) E. Charles Vivian, Robin Hood, illustrated by various artists, Chronicle Books (San Francisco, CA), 2002.
19. (Compiler) 'Tis the Season: A Classic Illustrated Christmas Treasury, illustrated by various artists, Chronicle Books (San Francisco, CA), 2003.
20. (Compiler) Robert Louis Stevenson, A Child's Garden of Verses, illustrated by various artists, Chronicle Books (San Francisco, CA), 2004.
21. (Compiler) Princess Stories, illustrated by various artists, Chronicle Books (San Francisco, CA), 2004.
22. (Compiler) The Glorious American Songbook, illustrated by various artists, Chronicle Books (San Francisco, CA), 2005.
