= Richard Snow =

American historian and writer

Richard F. Snow (born 1947) is an American historian and writer of novels and short stories.

Snow is the author of the 1981 novel, The Burning, a fictionalized account of the Hinckley, Minnesota, fire of 1894. His other works include The Funny Road (1975) and The Iron Road (1979), which was a Boston Globe–Horn Book Award Honor book in 1979.

== Biography ==
Snow graduated from Columbia University in 1970 and began working at American Heritage Magazine. Succeeding Byron Dobell, he served as the editor from 1990 to 2007.

After the magazine closed, he returned to writing full-time, writing:

- A Measureless Peril: America in the Fight for the Atlantic, the Longest Battle of World War II, about America's role in the Battle of the Atlantic during World War II (Scribner, 2011)
- I Invented the Modern Age: The Rise of Henry Ford, a biography of Henry Ford (2014).
- Iron Dawn: The Monitor, the Merrimack, and the Civil War Sea Battle that Changed History which won that year's Samuel Eliot Morison Award for Naval Literature.
- Disney's Land (2019), the story of Walt Disney's invention of the amusement park.
- Sailing the Graveyard Sea: The Deathly Voyage of the Somers, the U.S. Navy's Only Mutiny, and the Trial that Gripped the Nation (Scribner 2023).
