= Rottweiler =

Large German dog breed

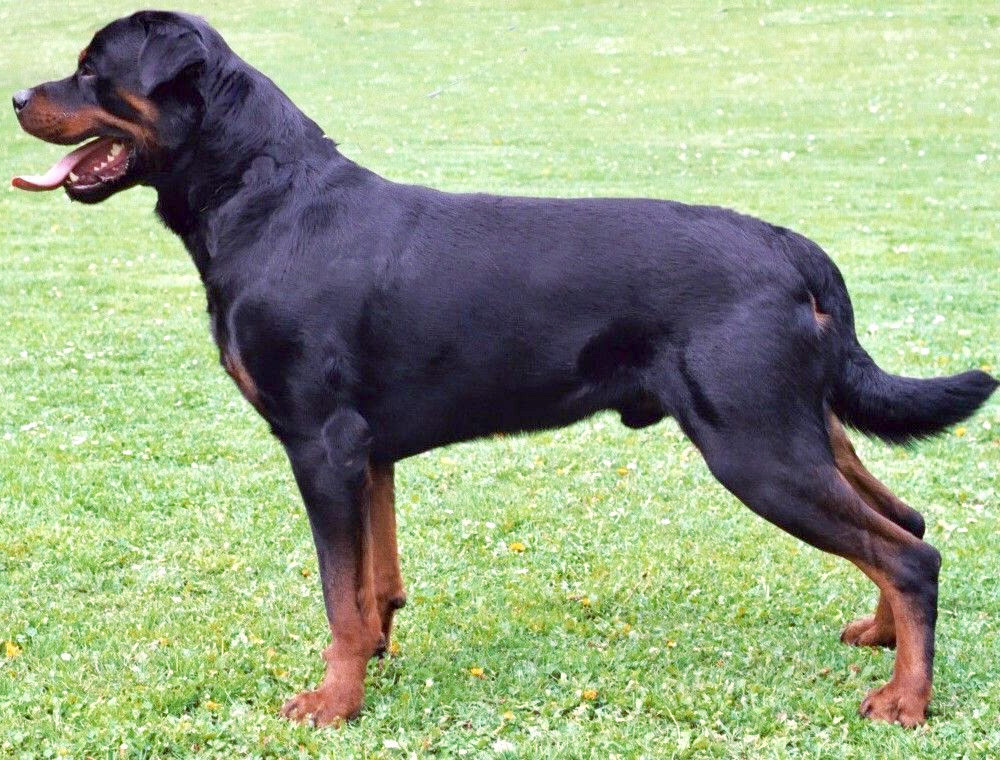
- Common nicknames: Rott; Rottie
- Origin: Germany
Traits
Height	Males	61–69 cm (24–27 in)
	Females	56–63 cm (22–25 in)
Weight	Males	50–60 kg (110–132 lb)
	Females	35–48 kg (77–106 lb)
- Coat: Double-coated, short, hard and thick
- Color: Black and tan, rust, and mahogany
- Litter size: 6-12 puppies
Kennel club standards
- VDH: standard
- Fédération Cynologique Internationale: standard

The Rottweiler (/ˈrɒtwaɪlər/, UK also /-vaɪlər/, German: [ˈʁɔtvaɪ̯lɐ]) is a breed of domestic mastiff type dog, regarded as medium-to-large or large. The dogs are known in German as Rottweiler Metzgerhund, meaning Rottweil butchers' dogs, because their main use was to herd livestock and pull carts laden with butchered meat to market. This continued until the mid-19th century when railways replaced droving. Although still used to herd stock in many parts of the world, Rottweilers are now also used as search and rescue dogs, guard dogs, and police dogs.

== History ==
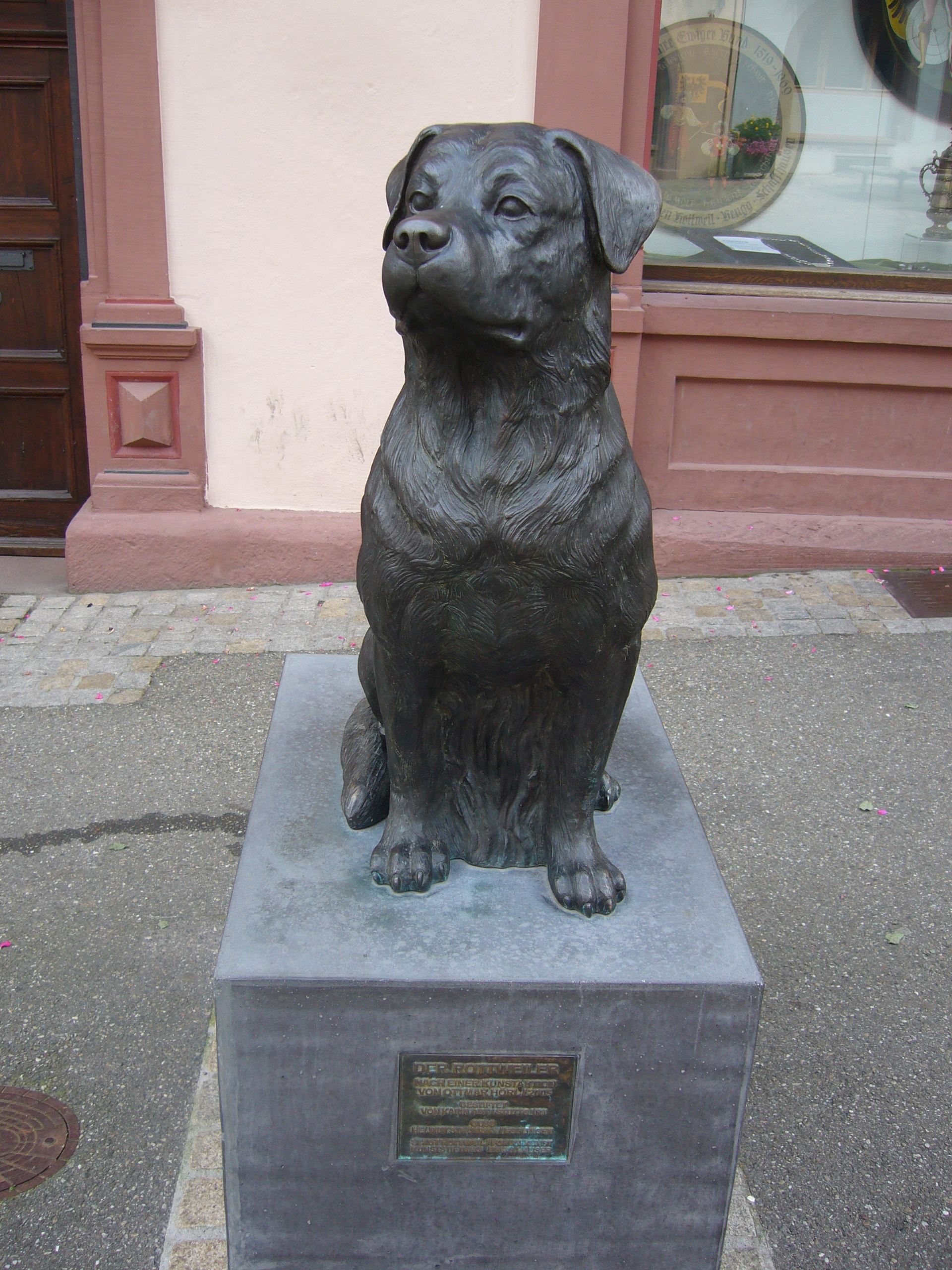
Rottweiler memorial in Rottweil

According to the FCI Standard, the Rottweiler is considered to be one of the oldest surviving dog breeds. Its origin goes back to Roman times. These dogs were kept as herder or driving dogs. They marched over the Alps with the Roman legions, protecting the humans and driving their cattle. In the region of Rottweil, these dogs met and mixed with the native dogs in a natural crossing. The main task of the Rottweiler now became the driving and guarding of the herds of cattle and the defence of their masters and their property. This breed acquired its name from the old free city of Rottweil and was known as the "Rottweil butcher's dog". The butchers bred this type of dog purely for performance and usefulness. In due course, a first rate watch and driving dog evolved which could also be used as a draught dog.

The buildup to World War I saw a great demand for police dogs, which led to a revival of interest in the Rottweiler. During the First and Second World Wars, Rottweilers saw service in various roles, including as messenger, ambulance, draught, and guard dogs.

The Deutscher Rottweiler-Klub (DRK, German Rottweiler Club), the first Rottweiler club in Germany, was founded on 13 January 1914, and followed by the creation of the Süddeutscher Rottweiler-Klub (SDRK, South German Rottweiler Club) on 27 April 1915 and eventually became the IRK (International Rottweiler Club). The DRK counted around 500 Rottweilers, and the SDRK 3,000 Rottweilers. The goals of the two clubs were different. The DRK aimed to produce working dogs and did not emphasise the morphology of the Rottweiler.

The various German Rottweiler Clubs amalgamated to form the Allgemeiner Deutscher Rottweiler Klub (ADRK, General German Rottweiler Club) in 1921. This was officially recorded in the register of clubs and associations at the district court of Stuttgart on 27 January 1924. The ADRK is recognised worldwide as the home club of the Rottweiler.

In 1931, the Rottweiler was officially recognised by the American Kennel Club. In 1936, Rottweilers were exhibited in Britain at Crufts. In 1966, a separate register was opened for the breed. In fact, in the mid-1990s, the popularity of the Rottweiler reached an all-time high, as it was the most registered dog by the American Kennel Club. In 2024, the American Kennel Club ranked the Rottweiler as the eighth-most popular purebred dog in the United States.

== Description ==
The Fédération Cynologique Internationale gives the following description of the Rottweiler standard: "Rottweiler breeders aim at a dog of abundant strength, black coated with clearly defined rich tan markings, whose powerful appearance does not lack nobility and which is exceptionally well suited to being a companion, service, rescue and working dog."

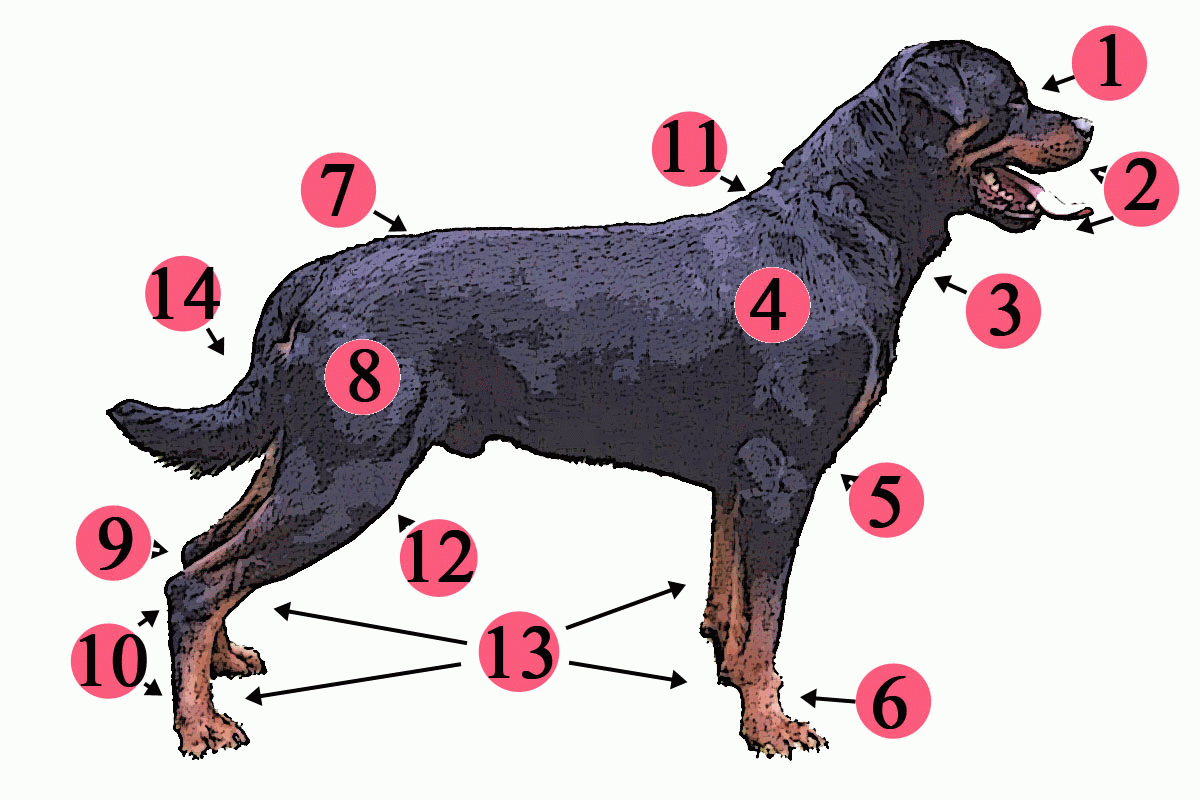
Anatomy of the Rottweiler (see left for description)

1. Head (eyes)
2. Snout (teeth, tongue)
3. Dewlap (throat, neck skin)
4. Shoulder
5. Elbow
6. Forefeet
7. Highest Point of the Rump
8. Legs (thighs and hips)
9. Hock
10. Hind feet
11. Withers
12. Stifle
13. Paws
14. Tail

=== Head ===
The skull is of medium length, relatively broad between the ears. The forehead line is moderately arched as seen from the side, with the occipital bone well developed without being conspicuous. The stop is relatively strong. Frontal groove not too deep.

The Rottweiler nose is well developed, more broad than round, with relatively large nostrils and always black. The muzzle should appear neither elongated nor shortened in relation to the cranial region. The ratio between the length of the muzzle and the length of the skull is about 1 to 1.5. The nasal bridge is straight, broad at the base and moderately tapered.

The lips are black and close fitting with the corner of the mouth not visible. The gums should be black, or as dark as possible. Both the upper and lower jaws are strong and broad. According to the FCI Standard Rottweilers should have strong and complete dentition (42 teeth) with scissor bite, the upper incisors closely overlapping the lower incisors. The zygomatic arches should be pronounced (but not exaggerated).

Upper and lower jaw strong and broad. Strong, complete dentition (42 teeth) with scissor bite, the upper incisors overlapping the lower incisors. The eyes should be of medium size, almond-shaped and dark brown in colour. The eyelids are close fitting and should not droop. The ears are medium-sized, pendant, triangular, wide apart, and set high on the head. With the ears laid forward close to the head, the skull appears to be broadened. The skin on the head is tight fitting overall. When the dog is alert, the forehead may be slightly wrinkled.

Faults: Hound-type head. Narrow, light too short, long, coarse or excessively molossoid head; excessively broad skull, (lack of stop, too little stop or too strong stop). Very deep frontal groove. Foreface long, pointed or too short muzzle (any muzzle shorter than 40 percent of the length of the head is too short). split nose; Roman nose (convex nasal bridge) or dish-faced (concave nasal bridge); aquiline nose, pale or spotted nose (butterfly nose). Pincer bite. Molars of the underjaw not standing in one line.

Severe Faults: Too molossoid type and heavy general appearance.

=== Neck ===
The neck is strong, of fair length, well-muscled, slightly arched, clean, free from throatiness, without excessive dewlap.

=== Body ===
The back is straight, strong and firm. The loins are short, strong and deep. The croup is broad, of medium length, and slightly rounded, neither flat nor falling away. The chest is roomy, broad and deep (approximately 50% of the shoulder height) with a well-developed forechest and well sprung ribs. The flanks are not tucked up.

=== Tail ===
The FCI 2018 Standard states:

In natural condition, strong, level in extension of the upper line; while paying attention, when excited or while moving it can be carried upward in a light curve; at ease it may be hanging. While positioned along the leg, the tail reaches approximately to the hocks or is a bit longer.

Historically the tail was traditionally docked at the first or second joint. However, docking is now banned in most countries and this is reflected in the FCI Country of Origin Breed Standard.

Although once "preferred" in early Standards, in 2018 the FCI Standard was amended to classify the Natural Bob Tail (aka "Stumpy") as a "Disqualifying Fault" along with "kink tail, ring-tail, with strong lateral deviation".

=== Limbs ===
When seen from the front, the front legs are straight and not placed close to each other. The forearm, seen from the side, stands straight and vertical. The slope of the shoulder blade is about 45 degrees. The shoulders are well laid back. The upper arm is close fitting to the body. The forearm is strongly developed and muscular. Pasterns are slightly springy, strong but not steep. The front feet are round, tight and well arched, the pads hard, nails are short, black and strong.

When seen from behind, the rear legs are straight and not too close together. When standing free, obtuse angles are formed between the dog's upper thigh and the hip bone, the upper thigh and the lower thigh, and the lower thigh and metatarsal. The upper thigh is moderately long, broad and strongly muscled. The lower thigh is long, strongly and broadly muscled, sinewy. The hocks are sturdy, well-angulated, not steep. The hind feet are slightly longer than the front feet. Toes are strong, arched, as tight as the front feet.

=== Gait ===
According to the FCI Standard:

The Rottweiler is a trotting dog. In movement the back remains firm and relatively stable. Movement harmonious, steady full of energy and unrestricted, with good stride.
However, "sluggish action while trotting" is considered a "Severe Fault".

According to the American Kennel Council the traditional gait of a Rottweiler is a trot. Therefore, the Rottweiler is a trotter. Trotting in this breed is by no means a fault and is required. This movement comes naturally to the Rottweiler and should appear as such; any deviation may lead to a disqualification in the show ring. While walking, the Rottweiler's legs, both front and hind, should move in a straight forward and backward manner. As with the straight movement of the legs, the path the Rottweiler moves in should also be straight. The Rottweiler's gait is all about balance and effectiveness as the breed is still used as a herder today.

=== Coat ===
The coat consists of an outer coat and an undercoat. The outer coat is of medium length, coarse, dense and flat. The undercoat should be present on the neck and thighs. The undercoat must not show through the outer coat. Rottweilers living in hot climates may have acclimatised and may be missing the undercoat. Rottweiler coats tend to be low maintenance, although they experience heavy shedding before their seasons (females) or seasonally (males). According to American Kennel Club breed standards, a Rottweiler's coat is short and straight. A coat that is long or wavy is considered a flaw to the AKC.

=== Colour and markings ===
The colour and markings of a Rottweiler are very distinctive. According to the FCI Standard a Rottweiler is always "black with clearly defined markings of a rich tan on the cheeks, muzzle, throat, chest and legs, as well as over both eyes and under the base of the tail"

The American Kennel Club calls for mahogany or rust-colored markings that do not take up more than ten percent of the dog's body color. All Rottweilers standard to AKC specifications have one mahogany dot above each eye on the inner brow ridge, on the cheeks, one strip on each side of the snout; cheek markings do not cross over the bridge of the nose, the top of the nose should remain black. The markings on the face should move down onto the dog's throat. On the chest, a Rottweiler will have two downward-facing triangular marks. On each front leg, the marks will stretch from the forearm to the toes. On the hind legs, the markings will begin on the inside and move outward onto the stifle, then out onto the hock stretching to the toes as well. AKC standards recognize that the black base color is not completely voided on the rear pasterns. There is a patch of rust or mahogany underneath the tail that resembles a triangle as well. A thin strip of black should be present on each of the Rottweiler's toes.

=== Size ===
Technically a "medium / large" breed, according to the FCI standard the Rottweiler stands 61–69 cm (24–27 in) at the withers for males, 56–63 cm (22–25 in) for females, and the weight must be between 50 and 60 kg (110 and 130 lb) for males and 35 and 48 kg (77 and 106 lb) for females. Weight must be relative to height.

== Temperament ==
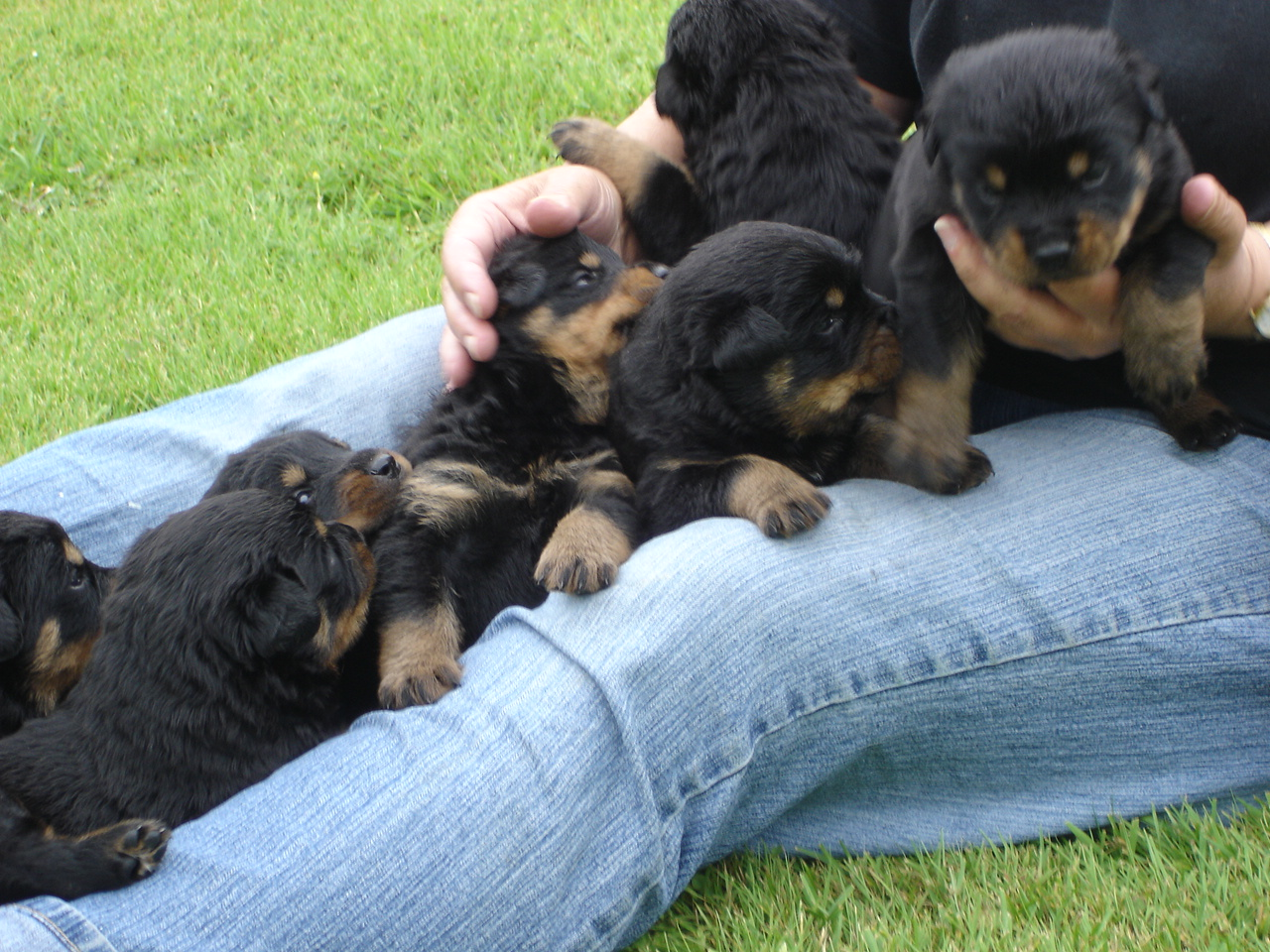
A litter of seven Rottweiler puppies at 3 weeks old

One study published in 2008 found that male Rottweilers have higher confidence, sharpness, and defense and play drives than females.

A 2008 study surveying breed club members found that while Rottweilers were average in aggressiveness (bites or bite attempts) towards owners and other dogs, it indicated they tend to be more aggressive than average toward strangers. This aggression appears correlated with watchdog and territorial instincts.

In the Rottweiler Handbook, Joan H. Walker states that "The Rottweiler is very territorial", meaning that the owner will have to regularly work with the dog to control its territorial aggressiveness.

== Working style ==
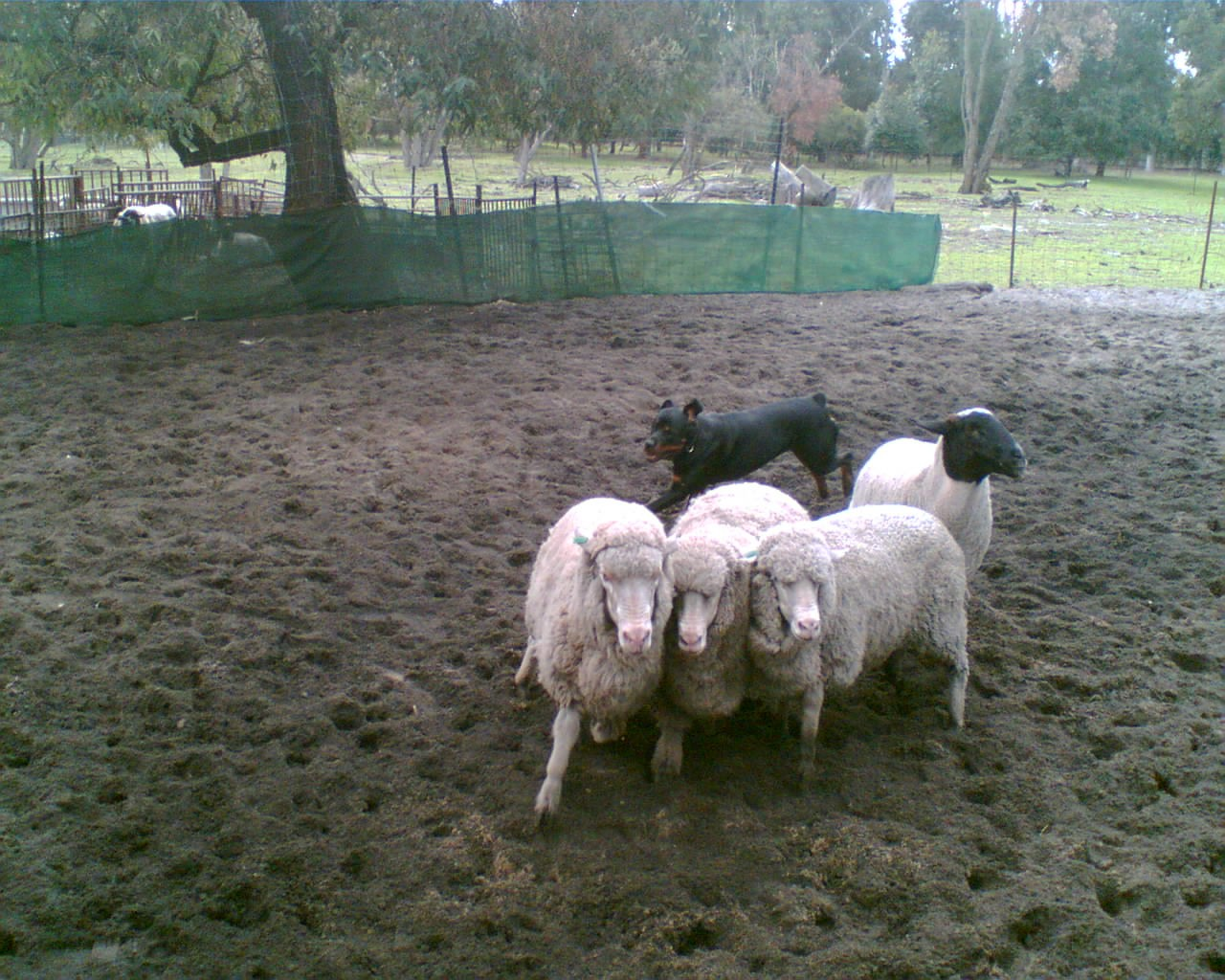
A Rottweiler herding sheep

According to the American Kennel Club, Rottweilers have a natural gathering style with a strong desire to control. They generally show a loose eye and have a great amount of force while working well off the stock. They make much use of their ability to intimidate.

The Rottweiler often carries the head on an even plane with the back, or carries the head up but with the neck and shoulders lowered. Some females lower the entire front end slightly when using their eyes. Males also do this when working far off the stock in an open field. This is rarely seen in males when working in confined spaces such as stock yards.

The Rottweiler has a reasonably good natural balance, force-barks when necessary, and when working cattle uses a very intimidating charge. There is a natural change in forcefulness when herding sheep. When working cattle, it may use its body and shoulders and for this reason should be used on horned stock with caution.

The Rottweiler, when working cattle, searches out the dominant animal and challenges it. Upon proving its control over that animal it settles back and tends to its work.

Some growers have found that Rottweilers are especially suited to move stubborn stock that simply ignore Border Collies, Kelpies, and others. Rottweilers use their bodies to physically force the stubborn animal to do its bidding if necessary.

When working with sheep, the Rottweiler shows a gathering/fetching style and reams directions easily. It drives sheep with ease.

If worked on the same stock for any length of time, the Rottweiler tends to develop a bond with the stock and will become quite affectionate with them as long as they do as it directs.

The Rottweiler is also exceptionally suited for and is commonly used in many dog sports including Agility and Schutzhund.

== Health ==
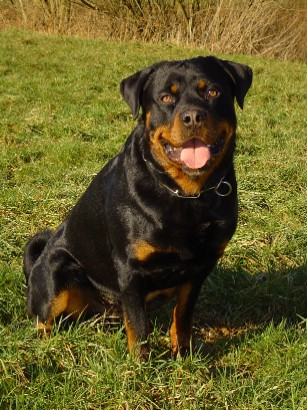
Rottweiler

A 2022 study in England of patient records found the average life expectancy of the Rottweiler to be 8 years, lower than the average of 12 years. A 2024 UK study found a life expectancy of 10.6 years for the breed compared to an average of 12.7 for purebreeds and 12 for crossbreeds. A 2024 Italian study found a life expectancy of 9 years for the breed compared to 10 years overall. A survey of breed club members found the most common cause of death in the Rottweiler to be cancer, with more than 45% of deaths in the breed being attributed to cancers.

The Rottweiler is prone to several skin conditions these include: acral lick dermatitis, calcinosis cutis, lupoid onychodystrophy, malignant histiocytic sarcoma, systemic histiocytosis, vasculopathy, and vitiligo. Follicular lipidosis is a skin condition found in red point dogs such as the Rottweiler.

An American study reviewing over a million cases presented to 27 veterinary teaching hospitals in North America found the Rottweiler to be prediposed to canine hip dysplasia, with 10.53% of dogs having the condition compared to 3.52% overall. This same study found the Rottweiler to also have the second highest prevalence of cranial cruciate ligament deficiency (CCLD) with 8.29% of dogs having the condition compared to an overall rate of 2.55%. For dogs diagnosed with both conditions the Rottweiler once again had the second highest prevalence with 1.34% having both hip dysplasia and CCLD compared to 0.3% overall. Another American study of over a million and a quarter of a million hip and elbow evaluation records in dogs over the age of 2 years found a prevalence of 20.1% for hip dysplasia and 38.1% for elbow dysplasia, the second highest in the study.

One study found the Rottweiler to be prediposed to gastric dilatation volvulus. However another study did not find a predisposition.

== Media portrayal ==
The Rottweiler is often portrayed in media as being dangerous or aggressive.

Some films and television shows, such as Lethal Weapon 3, the 1998 film Half Baked, and the hit HBO show Entourage, have portrayed Rottweilers in a positive light. They are also featured in the children's book series Good Dog, Carl by Alexandra Day.

In an event widely reported by the media, a two-year-old UK Rottweiler named Jake owned by Liz Maxted-Bluck was recognised for his bravery by the RSPCA. The dog was out walking with his owner when they heard screams. Jake chased off a man as he molested a woman on Hearsall Common, Coventry, in July 2009. He located the attacker and his victim in thick scrub, chased off the attacker, led his owner to the scene, then stood guard over the victim until the police arrived. The attacker was convicted of serious sexual assault and jailed for four years. Jake was nominated by police for the bravery award and medallion after the incident. Det. Con Clive Leftwich, from the Coventry police station, said: "From our point of view Jake the Rottweiler stopped a serious sexual assault from becoming even worse."

== Gallery ==
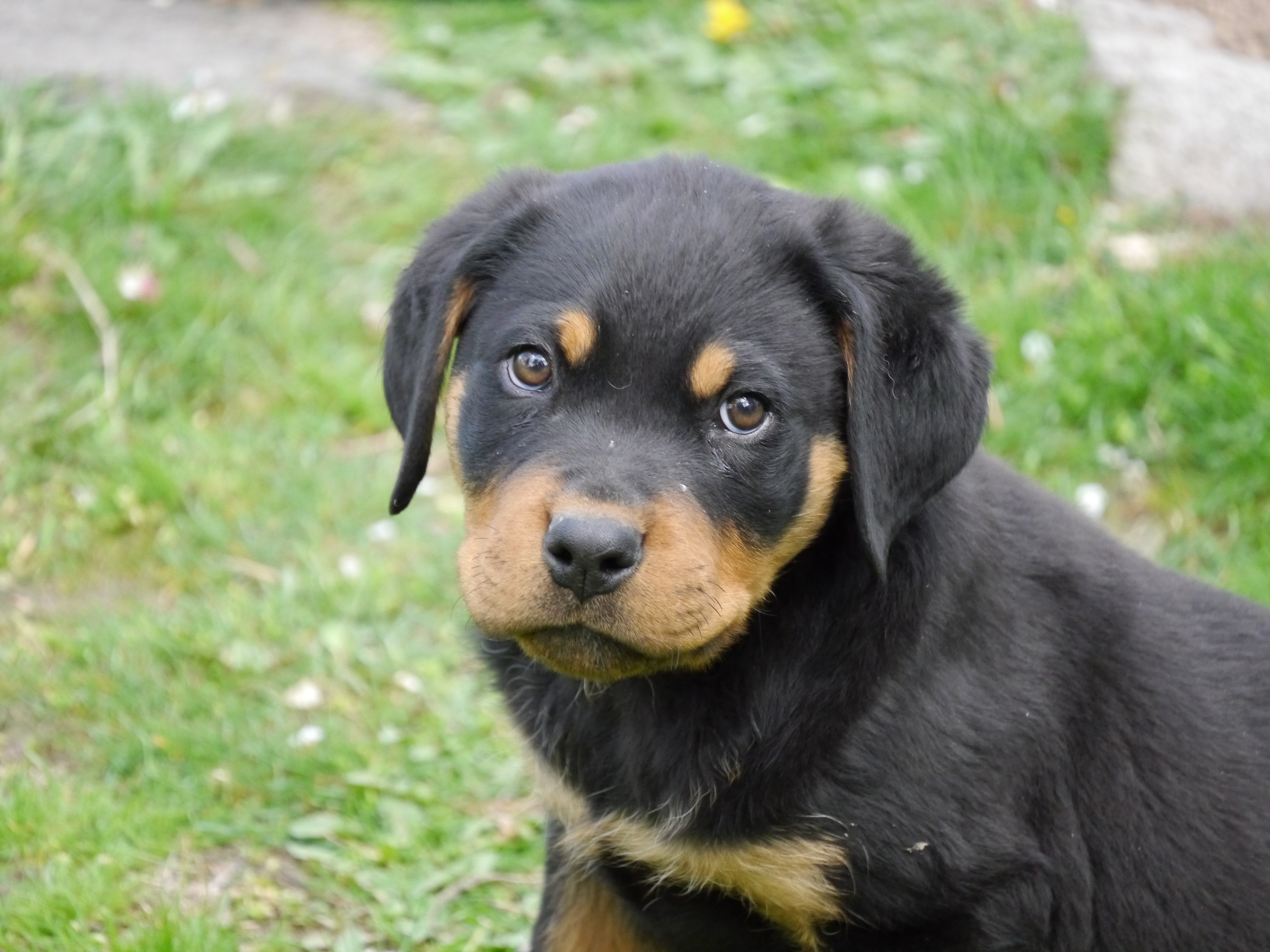
A 2 month old Rottweiler puppy

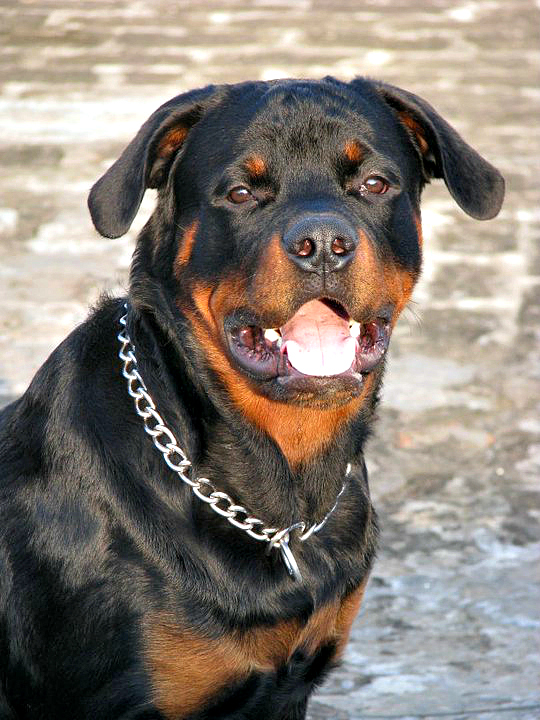
One-year-old Rottweiler

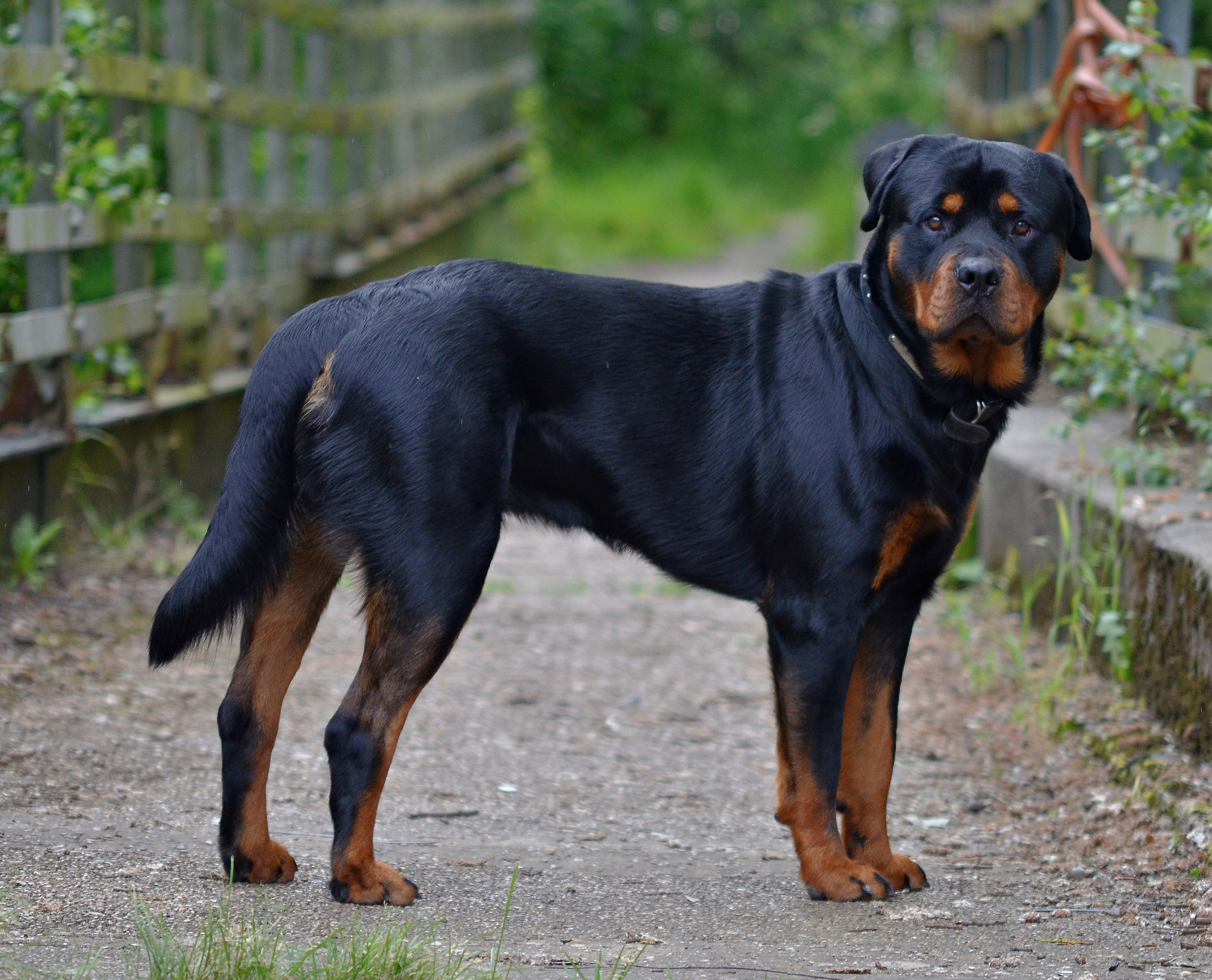
Male Rottweiler

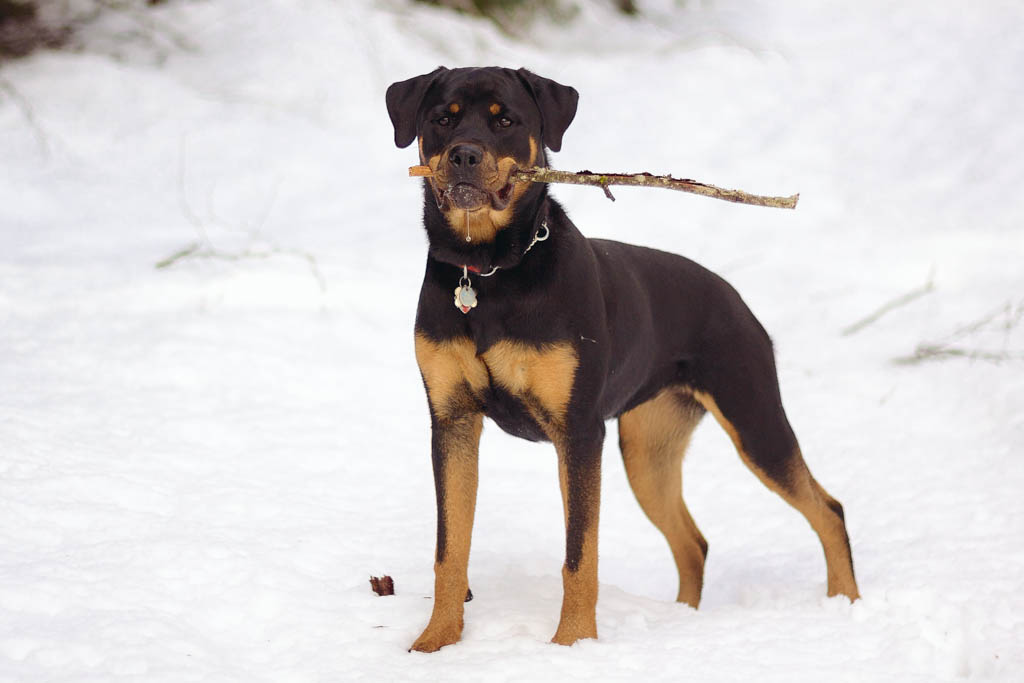
Female Rottweiler

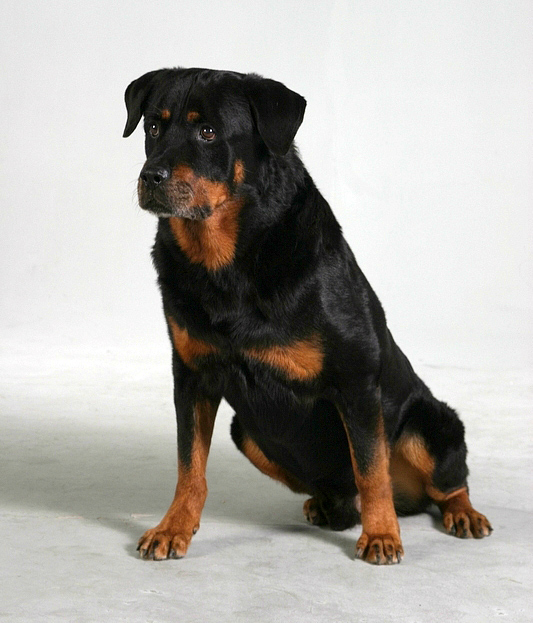
10-year-old Rottweiler

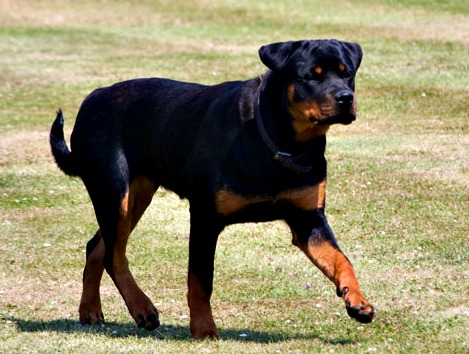
A Rottweiler appearing to be trotting

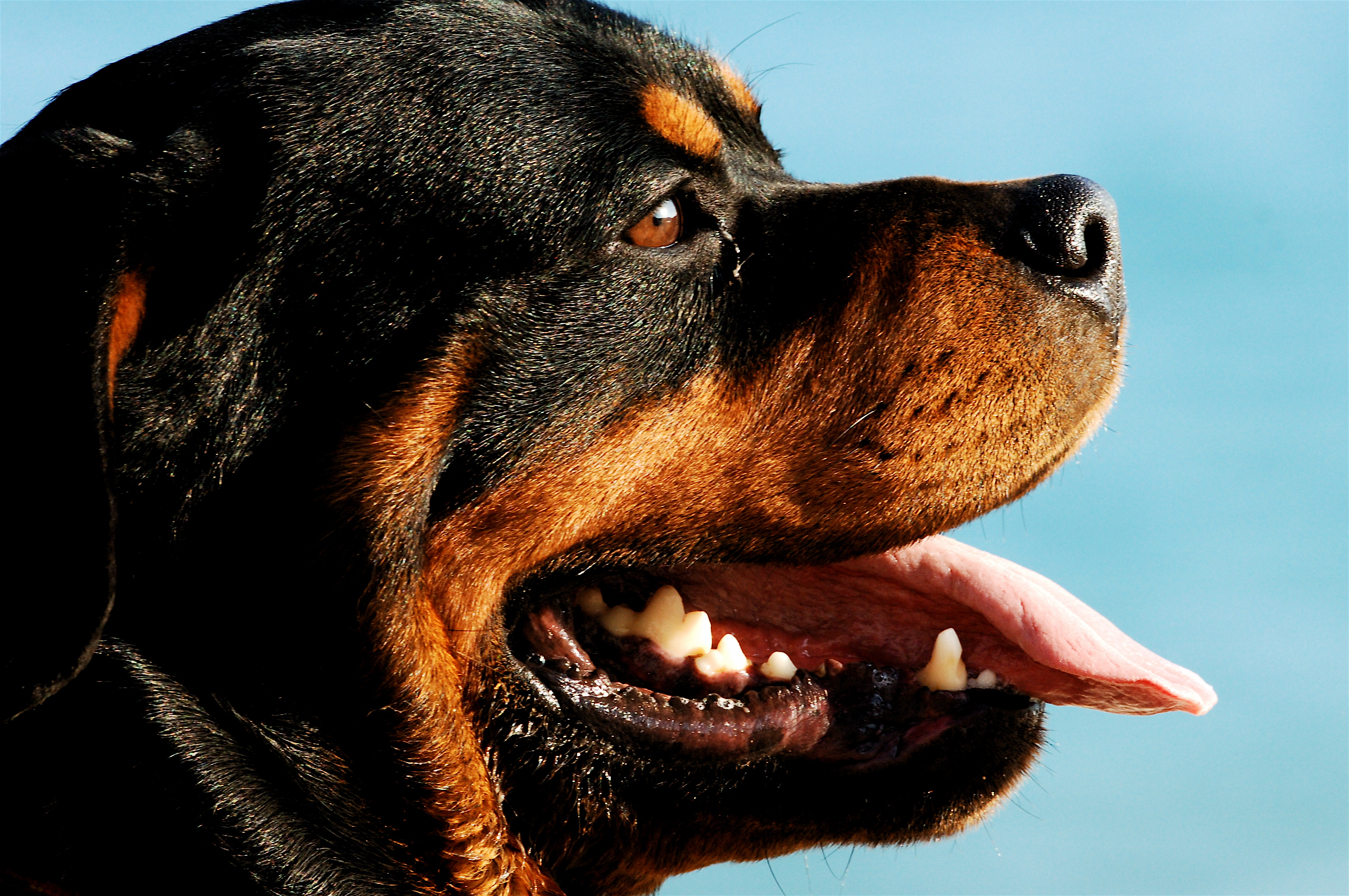
A close-up headshot from the side

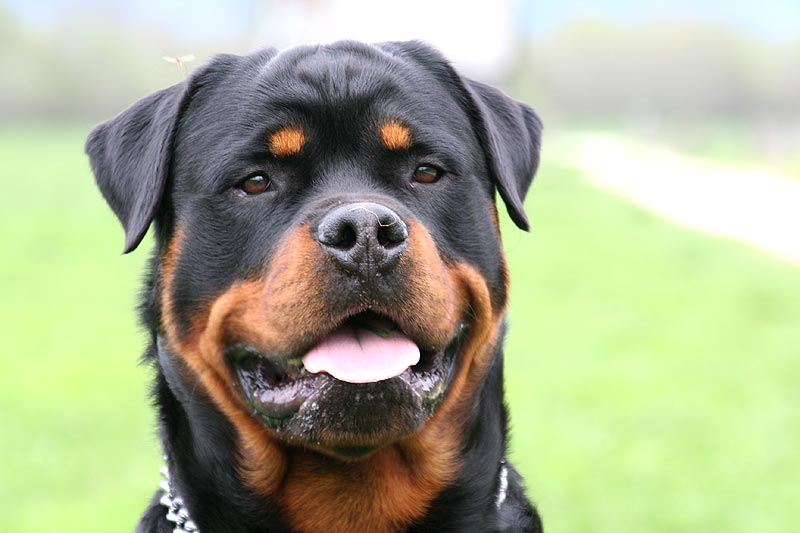
Headshot of a Rottweiler from the front

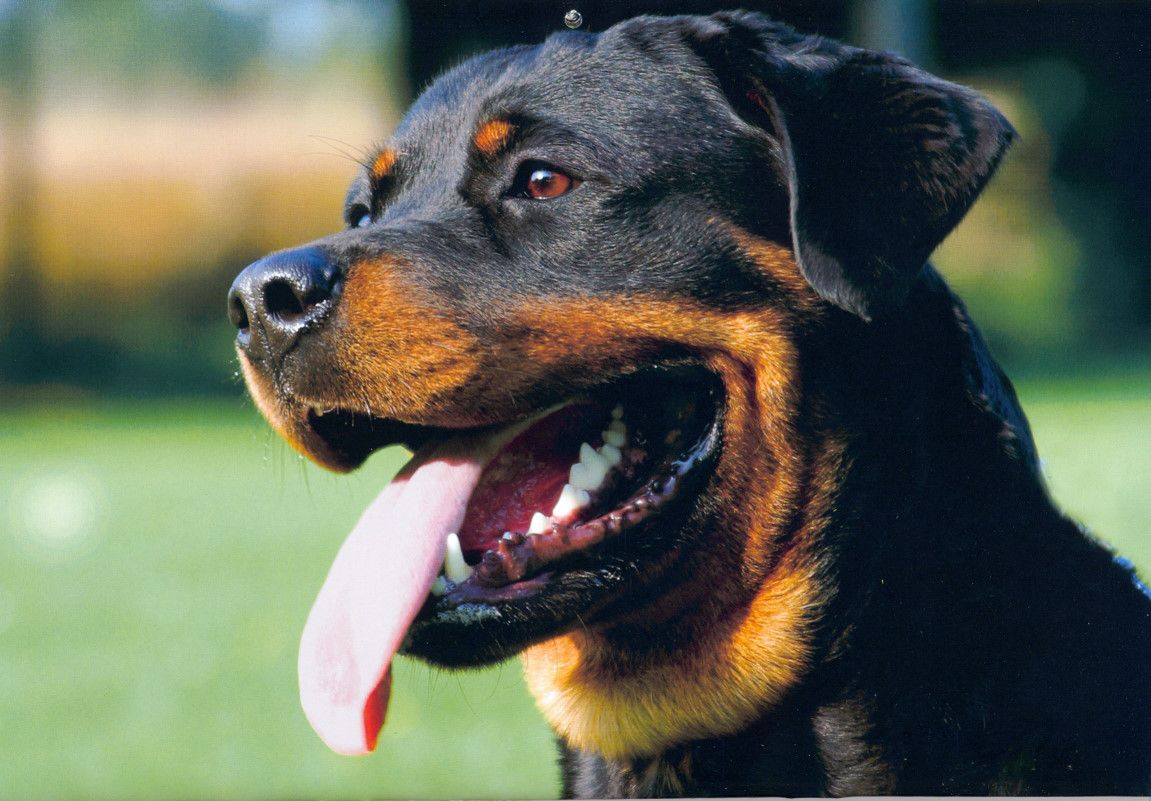
An oblique head shot

== See also ==
- List of dog breeds
