= Fergus Bordewich =

American historian (born 1947)

Fergus M. Bordewich
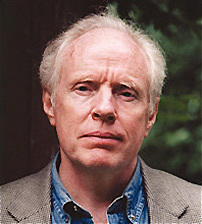
- Born: November 1, 1947 (age 79); New York City
- Education: City College, New York; Columbia University
- Occupations: Writer, historian, editor
- Spouse: Jean P. Bordewich
- Writing career
- Language: English
- Genre: History nonfiction
- Notable works: The First Congress, America's Great Debate, Washington, Bound for Canaan
- Website: www.fergusbordewich.com

Fergus M. Bordewich (born November 1, 1947) is an American historian and writer living in Washington, D.C., and Greensboro, North Carolina. He is the author of ten nonfiction books, mostly on American history between the Founding Era and Reconstruction. He has written for a wide range of periodicals, and is a frequent speaker on historical subjects.

== Life ==
Bordewich was born in New York City and grew up in Yonkers, New York. His father, Harold Bordewich, was an engineer. His mother, LaVerne Madigan Bordewich, was the executive director of the Association on American Indian Affairs, which in the 1950s and early 1960s was the only independent advocacy organization for Native Americans. This early experience helped to shape his lifelong preoccupation with American history, diverse cultures, and issues of race and political power. He holds degrees from the City College of New York and Columbia University. In the late 1960s, he did voter registration for the NAACP in the still-segregated South; he also worked in Alaska’s Arctic oil fields, as a taxi driver in New York City, and as a deckhand on a Norwegian freighter.

As a journalist from the 1970s through the 1990s, he lived in New York City, Athens, Greece and Beijing, China, and traveled widely in Asia, Europe, and the Middle East. His work focused on politics, economic issues, culture, and history, and included subjects ranging from the civil war in Myanmar, religious repression in China, Islamic fundamentalism, the Kurdish struggle for autonomy, German reunification, the Vietnamese economy, Kenya’s population crisis, and many other subjects. His articles have appeared in The New York Times, American Heritage, Smithsonian Magazine, Civil War Monitor, The Atlantic, Harper’s, Conde Nast Traveler, and Reader’s Digest. He is a frequent book reviewer for The Wall Street Journal.

He also served for brief periods as an editor and writer for the Tehran Journal in Iran in 1972-1973; a press officer for the United Nations in 1980-1982; and an advisor to the New China News Agency in Beijing in 1982-1983, when that agency was embarking on its effort to shift from a propaganda model to a western-style journalistic one. Bordewich has also authored a children’s book, Peach Blossom Spring (1994), based on an ancient Chinese folk tale. In addition, in 1991, he edited a collection of original first-person accounts of the Tiananmen Massacre in Beijing, Children of the Dragon.

He lives in Washington, DC and Greensboro, NC, where his wife, Jean P. Bordewich, is the president of Guilford College. His daughter, Chloe, is a scholar of modern Middle East history.

== Awards ==
In 2005, Bound for Canaan was named one of the New York Public Library’s "ten books to remember" and as one of the American Booksellers Association’s "ten best nonfiction books of the year". In 2013, America’s Great Debate won the Los Angeles Times’s prize as best nonfiction book of the previous year. It was also highlighted at the National Book Festival that year, and named one of the best books of the year by the Washington Post. In 2019, The First Congress was awarded the D.B. Hardeman Prize for history by the Lyndon B. Johnson Foundation at the University of Texas. The 2024 Free Press Prize for the Advancement of Knowledge was awarded to Bordewich for his book Bound for Canaan: The Underground Railroad and the War for the Soul of America, and for his "lifelong attention to racial justice". In 2025, Bordewich was invited to deliver the J. Howard Wert Lecture at Dickinson College, honoring Congress at War.

Bordewich has spoken at the Library of Congress, the National Archives, George Washington’s Mount Vernon, the New-York Historical Society, the Ulysses S. Grant Library, the Commonwealth Club in San Francisco, Princeton University, Yale University, the Civil War Institute at Gettysburg College, and many other venues, as well as on radio and television, most often on subjects related to eighteenth and nineteenth century American history. In 2015, he served as chairman of the awards committee for the Frederick Douglass Book Prize, given by the Gilder-Lehrman Center for the of Slavery, Resistance, and Abolition at Yale University.

== Books ==
Centennial: The Great Fair of 1876 and the Invention of America’s Future (2026) tells the story of the Centennial Exhibition, America’s first World’s Fair. Marking the nation’s first century, it opened at a moment when the country was striving to live up to the promise of its Founders while it struggled with racial violence in the South, spiraling labor conflict, renewed war with Native American tribes, and a fiercely-fought presidential election that would ultimately be decided by a single electoral vote. Bordewich’s narrative focuses on four protagonists: Republican presidential candidate Rutherford B. Hayes, inventor Alexander Graham Bell, railroad magnate Thomas A. Scott, and African-American sculptor Edmonia Lewis. In addition to a reckoning with the nation's stated ideals, the book is about the material progress on display at the fair.

The First Congress is a history of America's first Congress. Bordewich describes James Madison, Roger Sherman, Oliver Ellsworth, Elbridge Gerry, and Robert Morris in brief biographical sketches. "Bordewich's noteworthy exploration of the foundation for a working constitutional government provides an important perspective on American history."

In 2013, America's Great Debate was highlighted at the National Festival of the Book, in Washington, D.C. It was named one of the Best Books of 2012 by The Washington Post. In his review, Post publisher Donald E. Graham called the book "original in concept, stylish in execution. [It] provides everything history readers want. Two things above all: a compelling story and a cast of characters who come convincingly to life." Kirkus Reviews called it a "Wholly enjoyable study of an earlier era of intense political partisanship ... Bordewich portrays a colorful cast of characters—Democrats, Whigs, Free Soilers and abolitionists—whose passionate rhetoric attained lyrical heights and brought the debate about America's very identity to the forefront."

Washington is a history of the Byzantine politics behind the founding of the nation's capital and slaves who built it. Jonathan Yardley of The Washington Post wrote, "The role played by blacks in the early development of this country has been scanted for more than two centuries... and is only recently being placed in proper perspective. Bordewich makes an important contribution to that undertaking."

Congress at War: How Republican Reformers Fought The Civil War is a "sprawling story of legislative activism and ascendancy" of Radical Republicans after their southern colleagues left Congress. Andrew Ferguson in The Atlantic wrote, "in Bordewich's telling, Lincoln had little to do with the ambitious measures, [the Homestead Act, the Pacific Railway Act, and the Morrill Land Grant College Act] as if the bills were signed by autopen during coffee breaks," despite the fact that the Homestead Act and the Railway Act were part of Lincoln's 1860 platform. "But misjudging Lincoln's role as executive and his commitment to larger obligations is Bordewich's more telling mistake."

== Works ==
=== Non-fiction ===
- Cathay: A Journey in Search of Old China (Prentice Hall Press, 1991)
- Killing the White Man's Indian: Reinventing Native Americans at the End of the Twentieth Century (Doubleday, 1996)
- My Mother's Ghost, a memoir (Doubleday, 2001)
- Bound for Canaan: The Underground Railroad and the War for the Soul of America (Amistad/HarperCollins, 2005)
- Washington: The Making of the American Capital (Amistad/HarperCollins, 2008)
- America's Great Debate: Henry Clay, Stephen A. Douglas, and the Compromise That Preserved the Union (Simon & Schuster, 2012)
- The First Congress: How James Madison, George Washington, and a Group of Extraordinary Men Invented the Government (Simon & Schuster, 2016)
- Congress at War: How Republican Reformers Fought The Civil War, Defied Lincoln, Ended Slavery, And Remade America (Penguin Random House, 2020)
- Klan War: Ulysses S. Grant and the Battle to Save Reconstruction (Knopf, 2023)
- Centennial: The Great Fair of 1876 and the Invention of America's Future (Knopf, 2026)

=== Children's fiction ===
- Peach Blossom Spring, Illustrator Ming-Yi Yang, Green Tiger Press, 1994, ISBN 9780671787103

=== As editor ===
- Children of the Dragon
