= Portfolio Magazine =

American magazine (1979–1983)

- Editor: Edwin S. Grosvenor
- Frequency: Bi-monthly
- Format: Perfect bound
- Circulation: 110,000
- Publisher: Portfolio Associates
- Founder: Edwin S. Grosvenor
- Founded: 1979
- Final issue: 1983
- Language: English
- ISSN: 0163-092X

Portfolio Magazine, also known as Portfolio, The Magazine of the Fine Arts, was published bimonthly from 1979 to 1983 by Portfolio Associates of New York City. The editor and publisher was Edwin S. Grosvenor, who went on to edit American Heritage magazine. Other staff editors included Alexandra Anderson, Manuela Hoelterhoff, Denise Martin, Isolde McNichol, and Carter Wiseman.

The first issue was published in April, 1979, with articles by Hilton Kramer, Charles Moffett, and Colin Eisler.

Portfolio covered European and American painting, photography, architecture, and non-Western art. It aimed at a general audience, rather academics or art insiders. "Portfolio addresses people like me who are collectors, not scholars," a subscriber, Malcolm Forbes, told The New York Times. "It's comprehensive, superbly done, helps widen my horizons."

Contributing editors included Paul Goldberger, Linda Nochlin, Robert Rosenblum, and Vincent Scully. Other contributors included Kenneth Clark, Michael Coe, Owen Edwards, H. W. Janson, Antanasio di Felice, Hilton Kramer, Ben Lifson, Barbara Novak, Carter Ratcliff, John Russell, Kirk Varnedoe, and John Wilmerding.

In 1983, Portfolio was a finalist for a National Magazine Award in the General Excellence category. It was forced to suspend publication that year when a recession caused a drop in advertising pages.
