= Current Books =

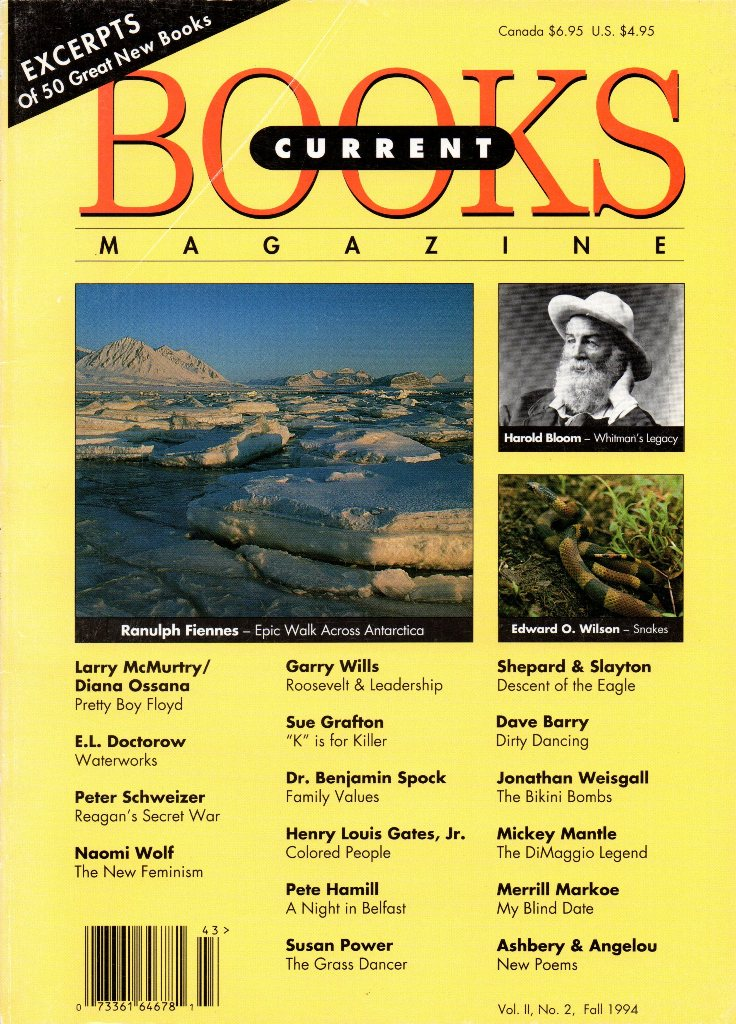
- Current Books was a literary magazine published in the U.S. from 1992 to 1995.
- Editor: Edwin S. Grosvenor
- Categories: culture, literature
- Frequency: Quarterly
- Format: Perfect bound
- Circulation: 24,000 copies shipped
- First issue: 1992
- Final issue Number: 1995; Fall 1995
- Company: Capital Communications Group, LLC
- Country: United States
- Based in: Bethesda, Maryland
- Language: English
- ISSN: 1063-9012

Current Books Magazine was a literary magazine published from 1992 to 1995 that featured excerpts from current fiction, nonfiction, and poetry books. It was founded and edited by Edwin S. Grosvenor and its cover designed by the noted art director J.C. Suarez. The assistant editors were Joshua Dinman and Nathalie op de Beeck.

"A new magazine called Current Books debuts this week," reported USA Today on June 12, 1992. "It offers the busy reader an opportunity to browse while nestled at home."

Over the next three years, Current Books was published quarterly and provided 20-25 excerpts of books per issue with an eclectic mix of writing by such authors as Margaret Atwood, Harold Bloom, Daniel Boorstin, E.L. Doctorow, Henry Louis Gates Jr., Jane Goodall, Nadine Gordimer, Sue Grafton, Stephen Hawking, Richard Leakey, Naguib Mahfouz, John McPhee, Bill Moyers, Joyce Carol Oates, George Plimpton, Anna Quindlen, Salman Rushdie, Jane Smiley, Wallace Stegner, and John Updike.

It also published poetry by Maya Angelou, John Ashberry, Robert Creeley, Louise Gluck, David Ignatow, Galway Kinnell, Mary Oliver, Charles Simic, and Derek Walcott.

Current Books claimed to be "the most widely distributed book publication in bookstores" at the time with copies for sale in 3,840 stores.

In July 1995, Dan Webster wrote in the (Spokane) Spokesman-Review that Current Books helped "to eliminate the guesswork associated with choosing" new books. "The newest edition, billed as the 'Third Anniversary Issue,' includes excerpts from such notable books as Anne Tyler’s 'The Ladder of Years,' Martin Amis’ 'The Information,' Norman Mailer’s 'Oswald’s Tale' and Sherman Alexie’s 'Reservation Blues'."

However, Charles Trueheart's earlier observation about Current Books in The Washington Post -- "great idea, straightforward execution, tough market"—proved to be prescient. The magazine was unable to sustain publication beyond three years and forced to suspend publication after the Fall 1995 issue.
