= Edwin S. Grosvenor =

American writer and publisher (born c.1952)

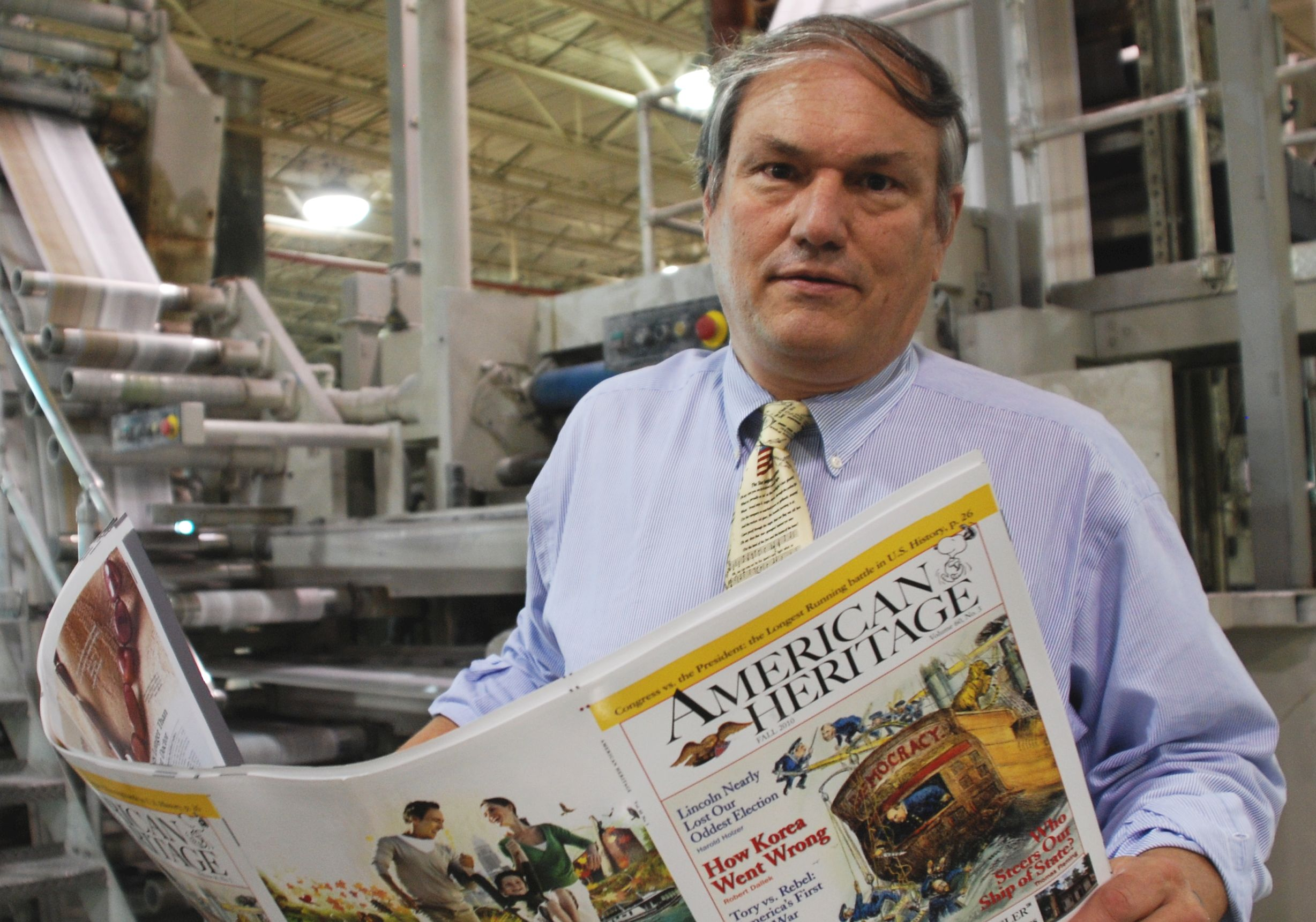
- Grosvenor in 2010
- Education: Yale University (BA); Columbia University (MS; MBA)
- Occupations: Editor; publisher; photographer
- Relatives: Melville Bell Grosvenor (father); Alexander Graham Bell (great-grandfather)
- Writing career
- Notable works: Alexander Graham Bell: The Life and Times of the Inventor of the Telephone

Edwin S. Grosvenor (born c. 1952) is an American publisher, writer, and photographer. He was the president and editor-in-chief of American Heritage. He has published nine books and is best known for writing on his great-grandfather, Alexander Graham Bell. Early in his career, Grosvenor worked as a freelance photographer for National Geographic.

== Early life ==
Grosvenor was born c. 1952. His father was Melville Bell Grosvenor, president of the National Geographic Society and editor of National Geographic magazine from 1957 to 1967. His great-grandfather was Alexander Graham Bell. His family established National Geographic.

Grosvenor developed an interest in photography at an early age. When he was eleven years old, a photograph he took at the Seattle World's Fair was published in the September, 1962 issue of National Geographic.

He received a B.A. degree from Yale University where he was a member of the Wolf's Head Society. He received an M.S. in journalism and MBA from Columbia University.

== Career ==
=== Photography ===
Grosvenor subsequently worked as a freelance photographer for National Geographic, completing 23 assignments for the magazine and its book division in such countries as Belize, France, Iceland, Spain, Tonga, and Turkey. On several assignments, he was the photographer for articles written by his father on sailing.

=== Publishing ===
In 1979, Grosvenor launched the fine arts magazine Portfolio. "Since no magazine was going to hire a 27-year-old to be editor in chief, the only solution was to start my own," he told a reporter for the Palm Beach Post. The magazine was published by Grosvenor Publications, Inc., a company founded by Grosvenor and his father. In 1983, Portfolio was a Finalist for a National Magazine Award in the General Excellence category.

In 1992, Grosvenor founded the literary magazine, Current Books. Although Current Books" was published for only three years, it claimed to be "the most widely distributed book publication in bookstores" at the time, with copies for sale in 3,840 stores. The magazine was widely regarded in the literary community and, in 1995, Grosvenor was asked to serve on the NEA's literary publishing panel. Its members elected him as the chairman of the panel.

In 1996, Grosvenor founded KnowledgeMax, an online bookseller and e-learning company, which merged with Sideware Systems in 2000. The resulting company, called KnowledgeMax, Inc., was publicly traded until 2003.

In 2007, Grosvenor led a group of investors who purchased American Heritage from Forbes. Grosvenor said, “When I read in The New York Times that American Heritage had folded, I said, 'We just can’t let this happen,’ " Grosvenor told an interview in 2009. "I contacted the Forbes family and said, 'This is like intellectual preservation. It’s important to save battlefields and historic homes, but this is the magazine that writes about the battlefields and the historic homes.’ And luckily the Forbes family agreed with me, and we formed a new company to save it.” Grosvernor was the president and editor-of-chief of American Heritage. Although American Heritage suspended print publication in 2012, Grosvenor led a group of volunteers that relaunched a digital version of the magazine in June 2017.

In 2012 and 2013, Grosvenor led a team developing Fourscore, an educational website offering thousands of essays and documents for teaching American history and government.

=== Writing ===
Grosvenor is the author, with Morgan Wesson, of Alexander Graham Bell: The Life and Times of the Man Who Invented the Telephone (Harry N Abrams, 1997). He also wrote Try it!: the Alexander Graham Bell Science Activity Kit, published by the National Geographic Society in 1992. He has also edited a number of anthologies from American Heritage and Horizon magazines.

== Personal life ==
Grosvenor is a member of the Organization of American Historians, the National Book Critics Circle, and the American Antiquarian Society. He is the historian of the Literary Society of Washington. Grosvenor received the President's Award from Historic Deerfield in 2012.

== Selected bibliography ==
=== Books ===
- Try It!: The Alexander Graham Bell Science Activity Kit and Experiment Book. Washington, D.C.: National Geographic Society, 1992.
- Alexander Graham Bell: The Life and Times of the Man Who Invented the Telephone. with Morgan Wesson. New York: Abrams Books, 1997. ISBN 978-0810940055.
- 299 Things You Should Know about American History. with John A. Garraty. New York: Abrams Books, 2009. ISBN 978-0810940055.

=== Articles ===
Following are some of the magazine articles Grosvenor wrote.

- "Did Alexander Graham Bell Steal the Telephone Patent?", American Heritage, vol. 58, no. 4 (Spring/Summer 2008).
- "The Pluck Heard 'Round the World", American Heritage, vol. 59, no. 4 (Winter 2010).
- "The Naked Truth of Battle", American Heritage, vol. 60, no. 4 (Winter 2011).
- "The Fountain of Youth 500 Years Later", American Heritage, vol. 62, no. 1 (Spring 2012).
- "1940 Census Reveals the State of America 72 Years Ago", American Heritage, vol. 62, no. 1 (Spring 2012).
- "Baltimore's 'Sailabration' Honors the War of 1812), American Heritage, vol. 62, no. 2 (Summer 2012).
- "Stop the War on History", American Heritage, vol. 62, no. 1 (Summer 2017).
- "Standing Bear Goes to Court", American Heritage, vol. 62, no. 1 (Summer 2017).
- "Shocked by Sputnik Sixty Years Ago", American Heritage, vol. 62, no. 5 (Fall 2017).
- "Holding Down the Fort", American Heritage, vol. 62, no. 5 (Fall 2017).
- "Tears for Marjory Stoneman Douglas", American Heritage, vol. 63, no. 1 (Spring 2018).
- ""Secret Race to the Pole", American Heritage, vol. 63, no. 1 (Spring 2018).
- "Blackface: The Sad History of Minstrel Shows", American Heritage, vol. 64, no. 1 (Winter 2019).
- "Descendant Sues Over Slave Photos", American Heritage, vol. 64, no. 2 ( Spring 2019).
- "Original 'Cricket Clicker' Found for 75th Anniversary of D-Day", American Heritage, vol. 64, no. 3 (Summer 2019).
- "Building the Transcontinental Railroad", American Heritage, vol. 64, no. 3 (Summer 2019).
- "A Nation with 'Collective Amnesia'", American Heritage, vol. 64, no. 3 (Summer 2019).
- "Rediscovering Hand-Drawn Maps from the American Revolution and the Duke Who Collected Them", American Heritage, vol. 64, no. 3 (Summer 2019).
- "The Reasonable Right to Bear Arms", American Heritage, vol. 64, no. 4 (September/October 2019).
- "What Do State Constitutions Say About "Bearing Arms?", American Heritage, vol. 64, no. 4 (September/October 2019).
- "Major Renovation Unveiled at Mount Vernon", American Heritage, vol. 64, no. 5 (Fall 2019).
- "Richard Reeves", American Heritage, vol. 65, no. 2 (Spring 2020).
- "Vandalism in Lafayette Square", American Heritage, vol. 65, no. 3 (June 2020).
- "Confederates in Congress: Heritage or Hate?", American Heritage, vol. 65, no. 3 (June 2020).
- "Confederates Honored by the U.S. Army", American Heritage, vol. 65, no. 3 (June 2020).
- "How the May Day Protests Stayed Peaceful", American Heritage, vol. 65, no. 3 (June 2020).
- "British Ships Lost in 1780 Hurricanes", American Heritage, vol. 65, no. 5 (September 2020).
- "Vampires in America?", American Heritage, vol. 65, no. 6 (October 2020).
- "Ike Balances the Court", American Heritage, vol. 65, no. 6 (October 2020).
- "Christmas Dinner at Mount Vernon", American Heritage, vol. 66, no. 1 (Winter 2021).
- "Pandemics in America", American Heritage, vol. 66, no. 1 (Winter 2021).
- "Stop the Censorship of Mainstream Publications", American Heritage, vol. 66, no. 2 (February/March 2021).
- "A Presidential Medal for Jan Scruggs", American Heritage, vol. 66, no. 4 (June 2021).
- "The Führer in the Kremlin", American Heritage, vol. 67, no. 2 (Spring 2022)
- "Putin and the Lessons of History: A Special Section", American Heritage, vol. 67, no. 2 (Spring 2022).
- "To Those Brave Men!", American Heritage, vol. 67, no. 3 (Summer 2022).
- "Bob Dole and the Nazis’ Brutal Last Stand in Italy", American Heritage, vol. 67, no. 3 (Summer 2022).
- "Remembering David McCullough", American Heritage, vol. 67, no. 4 (September 2022).
- "How the Cherry Blossoms Came to Washington", American Heritage, vol. 68, no. 2 (Spring 2023).
- "How We Saw the Vietnam War", American Heritage, vol. 68, no. 2 (Spring 2023)
- "Gun Rights in America", American Heritage, vol. 68, no. 3 (May 2023).
- "Bruce Catton's America", American Heritage, vol. 68, no. 6 (September 2023).
- "Sam Holt, Pioneer of Public Broadcasting", American Heritage, vol. 69, no. 1 (Winter 2024).
- "Honoring the Incredible Sacrifice of the Sullivan Family", American Heritage, vol. 69, no. 1 (Winter 2024).
- "Save the Glover House!", American Heritage, vol. 69, no. 2 (Spring 2024).
- "Discovered: First Maps of the American Revolution", American Heritage, vol. 70, no. 2 ( Spring 2025).
- "Important Early Maps of America", American Heritage, vol. 70, no. 4 (Fall 2025).
- "Little Round Top Restored", American Heritage, vol. 70, no. 4 (Fall 2025).
- "Knox Brings Cannon and Victory to General Washington", American Heritage, vol. 70, no. 4 (Fall 2025).
- "Watching Apollo 8 Leave Earth", American Heritage, vol. 71, no. 1 (Winter 2026).

=== Edited ===
- The Best of American Heritage: The Civil War. New York: American Heritage/New Word City, 2015. ISBN 9781612308562.
- The Best of American Heritage: Lincoln. New York: American Heritage/New Word City, 2015. ISBN 9781612308708.
- History's Great Showdowns. New York: New Word City, 2016. ISBN 9781612309422.
- The Best of American Heritage: Hamilton. New York: American Heritage/New Word City, 2017. ISBN 9781640190214.
- The Best of American Heritage: New York. New York: American Heritage/New Word City, 2017. ISBN 9781640190771.
- The Best of American Heritage: Vietnam War. New York: American Heritage/New Word City, 2017. ISBN 9781640190948.
- The Best of American Heritage: World War I. New York: American Heritage/New Word City, 2017. ISBN 9781640190931.
- The Men of the Revolution. New York: American Heritage/New Word City, 2017. ISBN 9781640191075.
- The Best of American Heritage: Churchill. New York: American Heritage/New Word City, 2018. ISBN 9781640191815.
- The Best of American Heritage: The Old West. New York: American Heritage/New Word City, 2018. ISBN 9781640193512.
- The Best of American Heritage: Roosevelt. New York: American Heritage/New Word City, 2018. ISBN 9781640191686.
- The Middle Ages. New York: Horizen/New Word Press, 2018. ISBN 9781640192201.
