= T. A. Heppenheimer =

American astronomer

- Born: Thomas A. Heppenheimer; January 1, 1947
- Died: September 9, 2015 (aged 68)
- Occupation(s): Space advocate and researcher

Thomas A. Heppenheimer (January 1, 1947 – September 9, 2015) was a major space advocate and researcher in planetary science, aerospace engineering, and celestial mechanics. His books are on the recommended reading list of the National Space Society.

== Books ==
- A brief history of flight: from balloons to Mach 3 and beyond (2001) ISBN 0-471-34637-3
- Colonies in Space (Stackpole, 1977) ISBN 0-8117-0397-5
- The coming quake: science and trembling on the California earthquake frontier (1988) ISBN 0-8129-1616-6
- Countdown: A History of Space Flight (1999) ISBN 0-471-29105-6
- Development of the Space Shuttle, 1972-1981 Smithsonian Institution Press, 2002. ISBN 1-58834-009-0
- Facing the Heat Barrier: A History of Hypersonics NASA SP-2007-4232
- First flight: the Wright brothers and the invention of the airplane (2003) ISBN 0-471-40124-2
- Flight: a history of aviation in photographs (2004) ISBN 1-55297-984-9
- The man-made sun: the quest for fusion power (1984) ISBN 0-316-35793-6
- The Real Future Doubleday, 1983. ISBN 0-385-17688-0
- The Space Shuttle Decision: NASA's Search for a Reusable Space Vehicle (1999) NAS 1.21:4221
- Toward distant suns (1979) ISBN 0-8117-1578-7
- Turbulent skies: the history of commercial aviation (1995) ISBN 0-471-10961-4
