= A. E. Dick Howard =

American lawyer (born 1933)

- Born: Arthur Ellsworth Dick Howard; 1933 (age 92–93); Richmond, Virginia, U.S.
- Education: University of Virginia School of Law
- Scientific career
- Fields: Constitutional law, Supreme Court
- Workplaces: University of Virginia School of Law
- Notable students: J. Harvie Wilkinson III; J. Michael Luttig

Arthur Ellsworth Dick Howard (born 1933) is an American legal scholar who has devoted his professional life to understanding the Supreme Court, the American Constitution, and constitutions of the world. He is the White Burkett Miller Professor of Law and Public Affairs at the University of Virginia. Washingtonian magazine has named Howard one of the most respected educators in the nation, and the Richmond Times-Dispatch and the Library of Virginia included Professor Howard on their list of the "greatest Virginians" of the 20th century. In 2013, the University of Virginia recognized Howard with its Thomas Jefferson Award—the highest honor given to faculty members at the University.

== Biography ==
=== Early life, education and clerkship ===
Born in 1933, Howard was raised in Richmond, Virginia. He graduated from Thomas Jefferson High School in Richmond. Howard attended the University of Richmond, graduating first in his class (B.A., 1954). He earned his law degree from the University of Virginia School of Law, again finishing at the top of his class (1961). He was a Rhodes Scholar at Oxford University, where he read philosophy, politics, and economics. Soon after graduating from law school, Howard was a law clerk to Justice Hugo L. Black of the Supreme Court of the United States.

When Howard began his clerkship with Justice Black, the balance on the Court had recently tipped toward the liberal side. After years of dissents, Black was now writing for the majority. Howard found himself at Black's elbow when the justice penned some of the Warren Court's most important decisions, including Gideon v. Wainwright and Griffin v. School Board of Prince Edward County.

After he finished his tutelage under Hugo Black, Howard joined the UVA law faculty in 1964. He began a career at the law school which would last for more than fifty years. Although his professional experiences are many and varied, Howard considers teaching the center of his academic and professional life. He cares most about his students and is happiest when working with them.

=== Redrafting Virginia's constitution in 1968 ===
Many scholars study constitutions, but Howard was afforded the rare opportunity to draft one. In 1968, Governor Mills E. Godwin, Jr. created a blue-ribbon commission charged with revising Virginia's Constitution, a post-Reconstruction document dating from 1902. The commission, in turn, asked Howard, then 34, to serve as the commission's executive director. In that capacity, Howard was the Constitution's primary draftsman. The proposed Constitution sought to make Virginia's government more responsive and responsible to the Commonwealth's people. Important changes included an assurance that every resident has access to an education, a pointed response to "massive resistance," an anti-integration movement during which some school systems opted to shut down rather than admit black students.

Having served as counsel to the General Assembly of Virginia during its constitutional revision session, Howard was then asked to lead the campaign for the Constitution's ratification. He spoke throughout the Commonwealth—at Rotary Clubs, union halls, chambers of commerce, and other natural forums. seeking to transform a paper document into a living idea. The campaign was a success. Seventy-two percent of the voters affirmed the new constitution.

Studied by other states and countries, Virginia's Constitution has endured, in large part because Howard helped ensure that the document was kept simple and to the point. He insisted that the commission not try to anticipate all the problems of the future lest its product become quickly obsolete. After the new constitution had been adopted, Howard penned the two-volume Commentaries on the Constitution of Virginia, which won a Phi Beta Kappa prize. In the Commentaries, Howard explored in depth the history of Virginia's Constitution, its political setting, its judicial interpretation, comparative data from other states, and its intersection with federal constitutional law.

Howard has been deeply involved in public affairs and civic life. He has been frequently consulted by governors, legislators, attorneys general, and other public officials on a range of constitutional and legal matters. He has served as counselor to the Governor of Virginia, and he chaired Virginia's Commission on the Bicentennial of the United States Constitution.

=== Oxford honors in 2001 ===
Professor Howard's academic accolades and experiences are numerous. He has twice been a fellow of the Woodrow Wilson International Center for Scholars, in Washington, D.C. He served as president of the Virginia Academy of Laureates and received the University of Virginia's Distinguished Professor Award for excellence in teaching. James Madison University, the University of Richmond, Campbell University, the College of William and Mary, and Wake Forest University have conferred upon him the honorary degree of Doctor of Laws. In the fall of 2001, he was the first Distinguished Visiting Scholar in Residence at Rhodes House, Oxford. In 2013, Howard received the prestigious Thomas Jefferson Award from the University of Virginia. The award commended Howard for advancing, through his character, work, and personal example, the ideals and objectives for which Jefferson founded the University.

Professor Howard has written a number of books, articles, and monographs. Two of his most influential publications relate to Magna Carta—Magna Carta: Text and Commentary and The Road from Runnymede: Magna Carta and Constitutionalism in America. Both works have been widely cited during Magna Carta's 800th anniversary in 2015.

Many of Howard's publications focus on the Supreme Court. An early article in the Virginia Law Review explored the jurisprudence of Justice Black through the lens of cases arising out of the 1960s Civil Rights Movement. Howard found in these opinions Black's core belief in three "rules of law"—a rule of law guiding judges in deciding constitutional cases, a rule of law for the people at large, and a rule of law for the body politic—"an open, free society in which people speak their mind, vote their preferences, seek legislative reforms, and have access to the courts to air grievances." Justice Black later said that Howard's article came as close to capturing the Justice's beliefs as anything written about him. In addition to writing about individual justices, Howard has sought to interpret the Court as it has evolved over time. In a recent article, "The Changing Face of the Supreme Court," Howard chronicles how the Court has changed from the time of the Warren Court to that of the Roberts Court.

Professor Howard has briefed and argued cases before state and federal courts, including the Supreme Court of the United States. He is a regular guest on television news programs; during the Senate Judiciary Committee's hearings on the nomination of Robert Bork to the Supreme Court, Professor Howard provided gavel-to-gavel coverage for the McNeil-Lehrer News Program. The media welcomes Howard's ability to distill difficult and lengthy legal materials into simple language.

=== Foreign constitutions consultant ===
Often consulted by constitutional draftsmen in other states and abroad, Professor Howard has helped constitutional ideas travel. He has compared notes with revisers at work on new constitutions in Brazil, Hong Kong, the Philippines, Hungary, Czechoslovakia, Poland, Romania, Russia, Albania, Malawi, and South Africa. In 1996, the Union of Czech Lawyers awarded him their Randa Medal, citing Professor Howard's promotion of the idea of a civil society in Central Europe; this marked the first time the honor has been conferred upon anyone but a Czech citizen. In 2004, the Greater Richmond Chapter of the World Affairs Council conferred on him their George C. Marshall Award in International Law and Diplomacy. In 2013, the Virginia Holocaust Museum and the Virginia Law Foundation bestowed on Howard their Legacy of Nuremberg Award for his "contribution to global standards for the Rule of Law and the prevention of crimes against humanity in the shaping and drafting of constitutions in many lands." Howard has traveled to those countries to discuss how constitutions might fit the realities of post-British, post-American, and post-Soviet empires. He has often hosted legal scholars and constitution makers from around the world at his home in Charlottesville. Indeed, a number of societies adjusting to "the rule of law" owe a debt to the constructive discussions in Howard's garden gazebo or the solarium of his brick Colonial home.

In each of these projects, Howard has insisted that his primary role is not to write constitutions but to enlarge the understanding of opinions and choices available to the drafters. Rather than advising drafters to borrow sections from existing constitutions, he has urged them to think through the process themselves. Howard believes the success of a constitution depends on its ability to capture the hopes and aspirations of its people. A constitution cannot create the values on which constitutionalism rest, but the document is nonetheless needed to give voice to the aspirations of democracy. Howard also has warned against treating a constitution as a code of laws that aims to solve all problems. A constitution that remains free of too much detail, he argues, is more likely to endure because it leaves room for organic growth. Howard believes constitutions are more than a letter of instruction for lawyers and judges. He sees them in humanistic terms, ultimately about the people whom they bind and simultaneously describe.

== Personal life ==
Arthur Ellsworth Dick Howard is called "Dick"—his mother's maiden name and a well-known Scottish surname. The Royal Dick School of Veterinary Studies, the United Kingdom's leading veterinary school, was founded by William Dick, one of Howard's collateral ancestors.

Howard is married to Mary Howard, an architectural historian and a winner of the Charles E. Peterson Prize of the Historia American Buildings Survey. He has one daughter, Jennifer, a writer and editor. He is fond of his several cats, opera, classical music, skiing, travel, and his two grandchildren, Lela and Finn.
