= Good Dog, Carl =

Book by Alexandra Day

- Good Dog, Carl book cover
- Author: Alexandra Day
- Genre: Children's literature
- Publisher: Farrar, Straus and Giroux
- Publication date: 1986–present
- Publication place: United States
- Media type: Print, audiobook
- Website: https://gooddogcarl.com/

Good Dog, Carl is the eponymous name of the first of a series of children's picture books written and illustrated by Alexandra Day centering on a Rottweiler named Carl and a little girl named Madeleine, of whom he takes care. All of the books are mostly wordless, relying on the details of the illustrations to tell the stories. Good Dog, Carl was published in 1985 and has been continually in print since that date. There have been fourteen "Carl" titles after the first. All but the first have been published by Farrar, Straus and Giroux. The board book versions of these stories are particularly popular. In addition to the parents and Rottweiler fanciers who have enjoyed them, the books have been found useful in teaching English as a second language, with Alzheimer's patients, and with children who are having difficulty learning to read.

== Other Carl titles ==
Published by Farrar, Straus and Giroux:

- Carl Goes Shopping (1989)
- Carl’s Christmas (1990)
- Carl's Afternoon in the Park (1991)
- Carl's Masquerade (1992)
- Carl Goes to Daycare (1993)
- Carl Makes a Scrapbook (1994)
- My Puppy's Record Book (1994)
- Carl’s Birthday (1995)
- Carl's Baby Journal (1996)
- Follow Carl! (1998)
- Carl's Sleepy Afternoon (2005)
- You're a Good Dog, Carl! (2007)
- Carl’s Summer Vacation (2008)
- Carl’s Snowy Afternoon (2009)
- Carl and the Kitten (2011)
- Carl and the Baby Duck (2011)
- Carl and the Puppies (2011)
- Carl at the Dog Show (2012)
- Carl and the Sick Puppy (2012)
- Carl’s Halloween (2015)

Published by Laughing Elephant Books:

- Goodnight, Good Dog Carl (2019)
- Good Dog Carl Visits the Zoo (2021)
- Good Dog Carl's Valentine (2021)
- Good Dog Carl Goes to School (2023)
- Good Dog Carl Goes to a Party (2023)
- Good Dog Carl Helps Out (2024)
