= Alexandra Day =

American children's book author (born 1941)

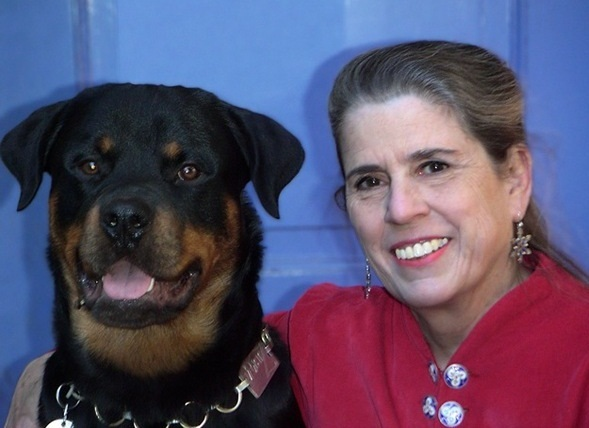
- Born: Sandra Louise Woodward; April 27, 1941 (age 85); Cincinnati, Ohio, U.S.
- Occupation: Writer/illustrator
- Writing career
- Genre: Children's picture books
- Notable work: Good Dog, Carl
- Website: gooddogcarl.com

Alexandra Day (born 1941) is an American children's book author. Alexandra Day is a pseudonym; her real name is Sandra Louise Woodward Darling. She is the author of Good Dog, Carl, which tells the story of a Rottweiler named Carl who looks after a baby named Madeleine. The book was first published in 1985 by Day's own publishing company, Green Tiger Press. Good Dog, Carl has been followed by a whole series of popular Carl books, published by Farrar, Straus and Giroux.

== Early life ==
Day was born in 1941 in Cincinnati, Ohio to a large and close-knit family. Painting was a popular family recreation, and almost every family excursion included one or more easels and a variety of sketch pads, chalks, paints, and pencils. For four years, the family lived on a hundred-acre farm in Kentucky. Here young Sandra grew especially fond of riding and training horses, and became a dog owner for the first time. Living in the country also provided plenty of time for reading, a life-long passion.

== Career ==
She and her husband, Harold Darling, founded a publishing company, Green Tiger Press, in 1970. Meanwhile, Day began a career in illustration, and illustrated her first book in 1983: The Teddy Bears' Picnic, based on a popular children's song by Jimmy Kennedy. In 1986 the Green Tiger was sold to Simon & Schuster and the Darlings started a book packaging company called Blue Lantern Publishing. In 1993, the Darlings moved to Seattle and founded a new publishing company, Laughing Elephant. Harold died in 2016 and Laughing Elephant is now run by Day and her children, Benjamin and Sacheverell.

== Carl book series ==
According to Day, the inspiration for Good Dog, Carl came from a trip to Zurich, Switzerland in 1983. Day and her husband saw in a bookshop window an antique German picture sheet by the great German illustrator and pop-up artist, Lothar Meggndorfer, of a poodle playing with a baby who was supposed to be taking a nap. This image proved the inspiration for Good Dog, Carl. Day's own dog, a Rottweiler named Toby, was the model for the book's main character, and since then five other family Rottweilers have been models for the books. All of the dogs have had their own names: Arambarri, Zabala, Zubiaga, Zulaica and Abelard. Day's granddaughter, Madeleine was the inspiration and model for the baby in the original Carl book.

Carl's Christmas was a New York Times bestseller.

Beside the "Carl" series, Day created the Frank and Ernest series of books featuring a bear and an elephant who engage in the colorful language of diners, CBers and baseball.

== Bibliography ==
=== The Carl series ===
- Good Dog, Carl, Green Tiger Press, 1985
- Carl Goes Shopping, Farrar, Straus & Giroux, 1989
- Carl's Christmas, Farrar, Straus & Giroux, 1990
- Carl's Afternoon in the Park, Farrar, Straus & Giroux, 1991
- Carl's Masquerade, Farrar, Straus & Giroux, 1992
- Carl Goes to Daycare, Farrar, Straus & Giroux, 1993
- Carl Pops Up, Simon & Schuster, 1994
- Carl Makes a Scrapbook, Farrar, Straus & Giroux, 1994
- My Puppy's Record Book, Farrar, Straus & Giroux, 1994; Laughing Elephant, 2005
- Carl's Birthday, Farrar, Straus & Giroux, 1995
- Carl's Baby Journal, Farrar, Straus & Giroux, 1996
- Follow Carl!, Farrar, Straus & Giroux, 1998
- Carl's Sleepy Afternoon, Farrar, Straus & Giroux, 2005
- You're a Good Dog, Carl!, Farrar, Straus & Giroux, 2007
- Carl's Summer Vacation, Farrar, Straus & Giroux, 2008
- Carl's Snowy Afternoon, Farrar, Straus & Giroux, 2009
- Carl and the Puppies, Square Fish, 2011
- Carl and the Baby Duck, Square Fish, 2011
- Carl and the Kitten, Square Fish, 2011
- Carl and the Sick Puppy, Square Fish, 2012
- Carl at the Dog Show, Farrar, Straus & Giroux, 2012
- Carl's Halloween, Farrar, Straus & Giroux, 2015
- Carl and the Baby Elephant, Laughing Elephant, 2016
- Goodnight, Good Dog Carl, Laughing Elephant, 2019
- Good Dog Carl's Valentine, Laughing Elephant, 2021
- Good Dog Carl Visits the Zoo, Laughing Elephant, 2021
- Good Dog Carl Goes to School, Laughing Elephant, 2023
- Good Dog Carl Goes to a Party, Laughing Elephant, 2023
- Good Dog Carl Helps Out, Laughing Elephant, 2024
- Carl Goes Shopping 40th Anniversary Edition, Laughing Elephant, 2025
- Carl Goes to Daycare 40th Anniversary Edition, Laughing Elephant, 2025
- Carl's Afternoon in the Park 40th Anniversary Edition, Laughing Elephant, 2025
- Carl's Masquerade 40th Anniversary Edition, Laughing Elephant, 2025
- Carl's Sleepy Afternoon 40th Anniversary Edition, Laughing Elephant, 2025
- Good Dog Carl and the Baby Elephant 40th Anniversary Edition, Laughing Elephant, 2025
- Good Dog Carl's Valentine 40th Anniversary Edition, Laughing Elephant, 2025
- Goodnight Good Dog Carl 40th Anniversary Edition, Laughing Elephant, 2025

=== Other books ===
- The Teddy Bears’ Picnic, Green Tiger Press, 1983 (by Jimmy Kennedy)
- The Blue Faience Hippopotamus, Green Tiger Press, 1984 (by Joan Grant)
- When You Wish upon a Star, Green Tiger Press, 1994
- Frank and Ernest, Scholastic Corporation, 1988
- Paddy's Payday, Puffin Books, 1989
- Frank and Ernest Play Ball, Scholastic, 1990
- River Parade, Puffin, 1990
- Frank and Ernest on the Road, Scholastic, 1994
- A Bouquet, Laughing Elephant, 1996
- The Christmas We Moved to the Barn, HarperCollins, 1997 (by Cooper Edens)
- Mirror, Farrar, Straus & Giroux, 1997 (by Christina Darling)
- Boswell Wide Awake, Farrar, Straus & Giroux, 1999
- Darby, The Special Order Pup, Dial, 2000 (with Cooper Edens)
- Special Deliveries, HarperCollins, 2001 (by Cooper Edens)
- Puppy Trouble, Farrar, Straus & Giroux, 2002
- The Flight of a Dove, Farrar, Straus & Giroux, 2004
- Not Forgotten, Laughing Elephant, 2004
- Hooray for Dogs, Laughing Elephant, 2008
- The Fairy Dogfather, Laughing Elephant, 2012
