= Guavaween =

Former annual Halloween celebration in Tampa, Florida, US

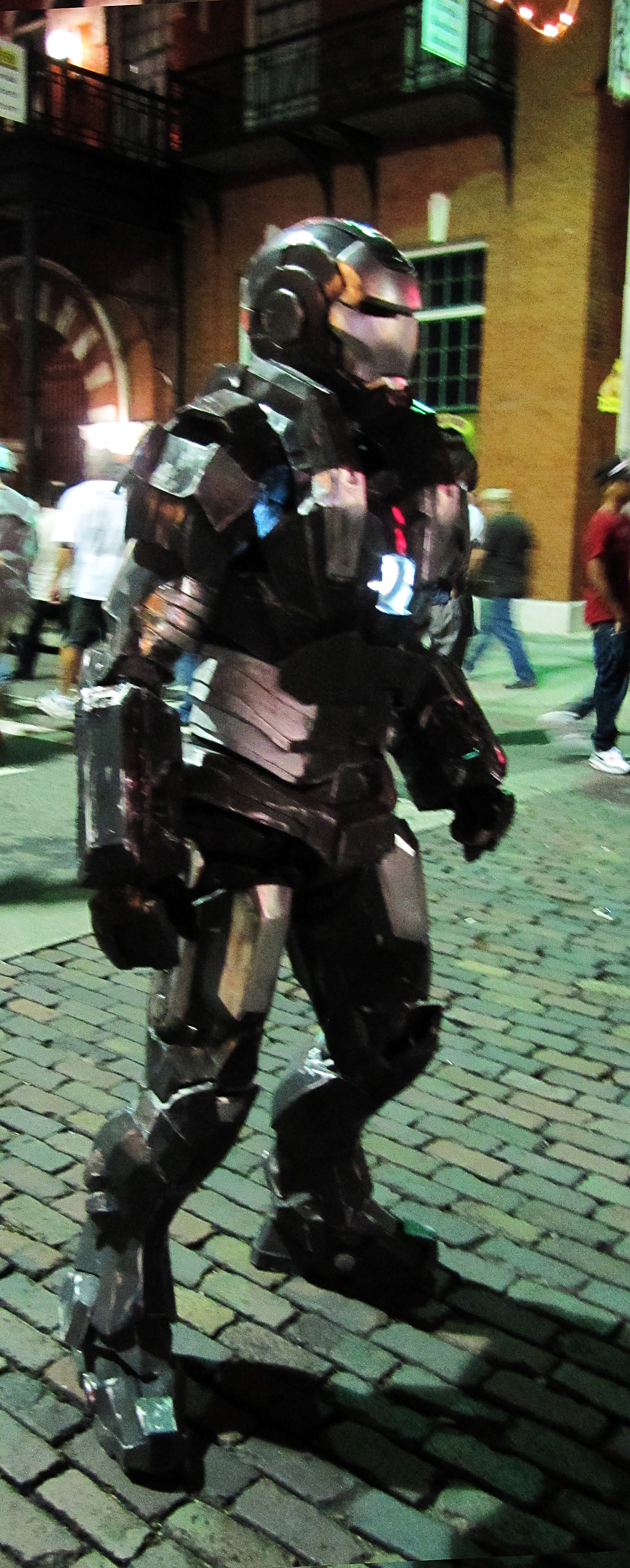
A War Machine cosplayer on Guavaween, 2011

Guavaween was an annual Latin-flavored Halloween celebration which took place on the last Saturday of October in the historic neighborhood of Ybor City in Tampa, Florida. It was named after Tampa's nickname, "The Big Guava".

Guavaween quickly became one of the largest festivals in Ybor. The daylight hours were family-oriented and in the past had included such activities as a costume contest, scavenger hunt, safe trick-or-treat at Centro Ybor, food and amusement rides. Around dusk, the Mama Guava Stumble Parade, Guavaween's most popular attraction, made its way down Seventh Avenue, the main street in Ybor. The parade, led by Mama Guava, featured floats and costumed individuals who threw candy and beads to the spectators.

== History ==
=== Historical roots ===
In the 1880s, Spanish-born and New York-based Gavino Gutierrez came to the area to search for wild guava trees for commercial cultivation. While he did not find usable trees, he found the area had other uses. On his way back to New York, Gutierrez stopped by Key West to visit his friend, cigar manufacturer Vicente Martinez-Ybor. Ybor was looking for a place to relocate his prosperous business, and Gutierrez recommended Tampa. Ybor took his advice and eventually founded Ybor City, helping Tampa grow from a small village to a bustling city over the next few decades.

Referencing this local history in the 1970s, local newspaper columnist Steve Otto planted the idea that if New York City is the "Big Apple", then Tampa must be the "Big Guava".

=== Early Guavaween ===
According to a known area artist and college professor of art, prior to Mama Guava and Guavaween, many young artists were sharing loft spaces in an old closed cigar factory in the late 1970s and decided to throw a large Halloween party and charge all who attended $1. The party was a success. The artists continued the party in subsequent years, and the crowds grew as word spread. Soon, from the artists' original Halloween parties, Guavaween evolved. The first Artists and Writers Ball was given at the Cuban Club in their courtyard. The Tampa Tribune was the sponsor of that affair, which featured many bands and entertainers. It was a success as people from all walks of life joined, sharing tables, eating, drinking and dancing the night away.

The Artists and Writers Ball started as an underground alternative to the Gasparilla Pirate Festival. The Artists and Writers Group (Bud Lee, Peggy Lee, David Audet, Paul Wilborn, Beverly Coe and Bebe Williams) was the impetus behind the ball. It was traditionally held in early February around the time of Gasparilla.

=== Ending ===
Guavaween in its heyday reached an estimated attendance of 120,000 people, but with that brought problems of property damage, arrests and medical emergencies. The following year, the area was enclosed by fencing to aid in crowd control. In 1992, the Artists and Writers Ball which had co-sponsored the event parted ways with the Ybor Chamber of Commerce, the other major sponsor. As the cost of the event increased and the funds decreased, it was decided in 1995 to begin charging admission. The event continued to be strong, with artists such as Rihanna performing in 2005, just a few months after the American release of her first album in August. During these years, the event continued to struggle with its image, with the attendees pushing the envelope on dress and behavior and the local chamber of commerce and the city council concerned about the image projected. At the same time the costs to host the activity continued to rise, seeing the entry fee of $4 in 1994 increase to $17 in 2015. As prices increased, efforts were made to decrease expenses. The first step was to remove motorized vehicles from the parade in 2009, which allowed them to eliminate the barriers between the attendees and the parade for an estimated savings of $4,000. 2009 brought with it other changes as well; it had an attendance of only 15,000 people. Using horses to draw the floats in 2009 proved ineffective, and by 2012 the parade had been eliminated.

In the 2000s, attendance steadily dropped. The fencing came down and the entrance fee was eliminated. As a result, the city's ban on drinking in the streets applied again, and attendees could no longer drink alcohol at the event. The event lost more patrons with this move, as well as its ticket income.. The last attempt to revitalize the event was the hiring of an outside event firm to organize the event. They changed the activity from a street party attracting tens of thousands to a music festival. Part of the reasoning was that the roots of the event stemmed from the ideas of the Artists and Writers Ball. The event now changed from an outdoor activity to indoor music at selected locations throughout Ybor. Tickets cost $20 on the day of the event and $85 for VIP access. It also morphed to a strictly adult event since all venues served alcohol, preventing anyone under 21 from attending, which hurt attendance even more since in the past many of the attendees were local college students and other young adults.

== Events ==
The celebration attracted 250,000 people in 1990, but in 2009 only 15,000 people attended. Guavaween Family FunFest filled the streets between 10:00 a.m. and 3:00 p.m. offering activities for all ages. Activities included a scavenger hunt, safe trick-or-treating, live music, food, rides, contests and the Children's Costume Contest and Mama Guava Stumble Parade.

For twenty years, the ornately decorated Mama Guava led her loyal band of followers and revelers in the Mama Guava Stumble Parade. Mama Guava claimed to be "taking the 'bore' out of Ybor." After 4:00 p.m., Mama Guava welcomed her adult revelers and the evening party got under way. Guavaween was a party that acted as the primary fundraiser for the Ybor City Chamber of Commerce. Guavaween helped preserve Ybor City, Tampa's oldest neighborhood.

It was quite common for both adults and children to attend Guavaween in costume. Things tended to become more risqué during the evening hours. Parking could be extremely difficult in Ybor during Guavaween. Shuttle buses ran from Florida State Fairgrounds, Raymond James Stadium, Tampa Port Authority, and University of South Florida Sun Dome.
