= Barry Popik =

American etymologist

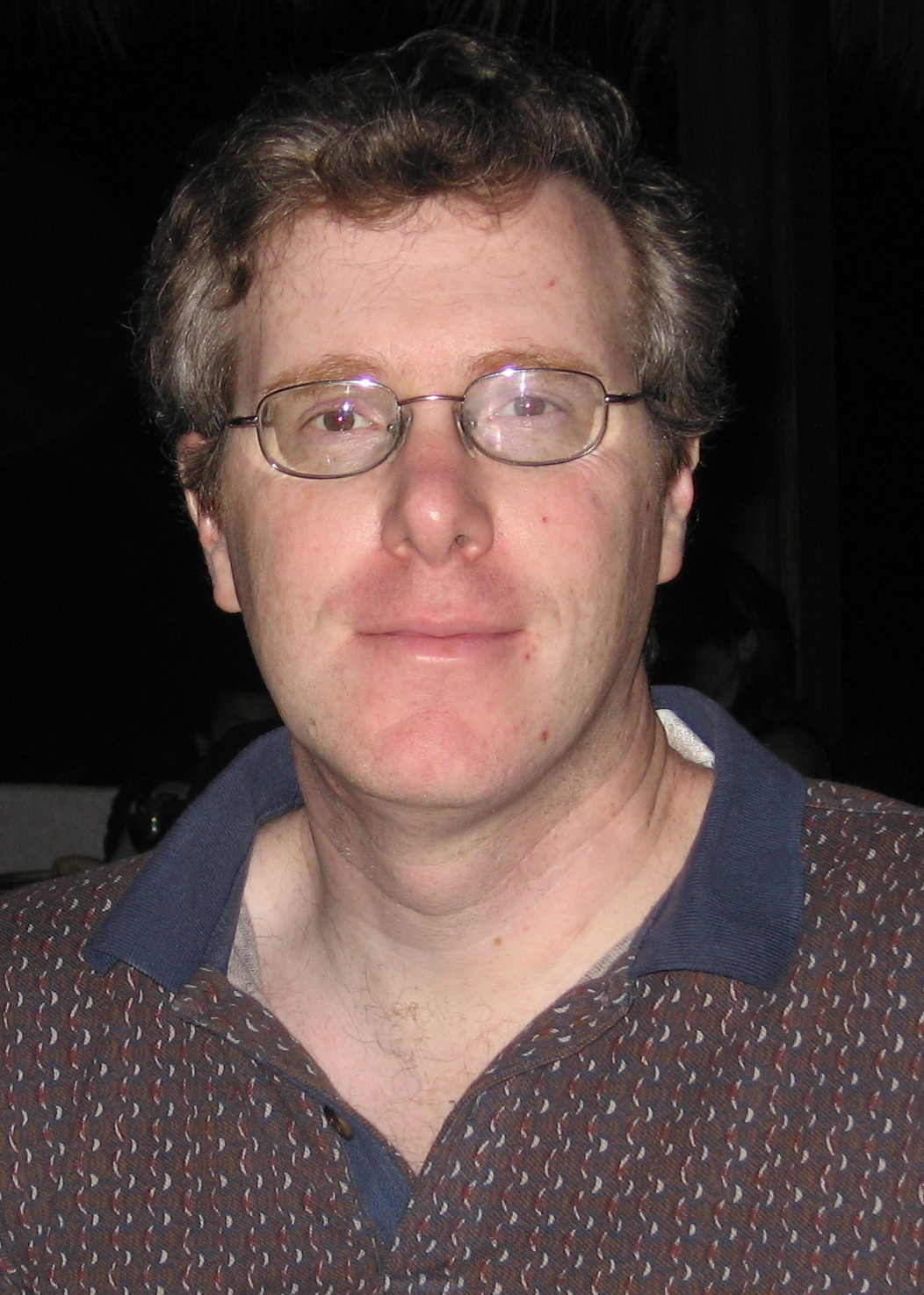
Popik in 2008

Barry Popik (born August 6, 1961) is an American etymologist. Popik is a consulting editor of the Oxford Encyclopedia of Food and Drink in America and was described in The Wall Street Journal as "the restless genius of American etymology".

== Early life and education ==
Popik was born and raised in Rockland County, New York, in 1961, to Silvia Stahl and Sidney Popik. He was educated at Rensselaer Polytechnic Institute, in Troy, New York, graduating with a B.S. in economics in 1982 and a B.S. in management in 1982. He received a J.D. from Touro Law School in Huntington, New York, in 1985.

== Career ==
Popik is a freelance contributor-consultant to the Oxford English Dictionary, Dictionary of American Regional English, Historical Dictionary of American Slang and The Yale Book of Quotations.

Popik contributed his independent research to the 2011 edition of Professor Gerald Cohen's original 1991 monograph on the etymology of "Big Apple" — that it was first popularized in the 1920s by sports writer John J. Fitz Gerald — which led to the New York City street corner where Fitz Gerald lived being renamed "Big Apple Corner" in 1997.

=== Political career ===
Popik was the Republican Party and Liberal Party of New York candidate for election as Manhattan Borough president in 2005. He received more than 40,000 votes and finished second to Scott Stringer, who received more than 200,000 votes. Popik was a law judge with the Parking Violations Bureau of the city's Department of Finance.

== Personal life ==
Popik met his wife Angie Garcia, a political strategist, while running for Manhattan Borough president in 2005. They married shortly afterward and moved to Austin, Texas, in September 2006, and had two children. After seven years in Austin, the family moved back to New York.

== Publications ==
Author

- Cohen, Gerald Leonard; Barry A. Popik (1999). Studies in Slang: Part VI. Frankfurt am Main: Peter Lang. ISBN 0-8204-4377-8. OCLC 62059348.
- Cohen, Gerald Leonard; Barry A. Popik (2006). Studies in Slang: Part VII. Archived from the original on August 26, 2011.

Contributor

- Smith, Andrew F. (2004). The Oxford Encyclopedia of Food and Drink in America. Oxford; New York: Oxford University Press. ISBN 978-0-19-517552-3. OCLC 53476629.
- Shapiro Fred R., ed. (October 30, 2006). The Yale Book of Quotations. New Haven, Conn.: Yale University Press. ISBN 978-0-300-10798-2. OCLC 66527213.
