= Nicknames of New York City =

Slang terms for the most populous city in the United States

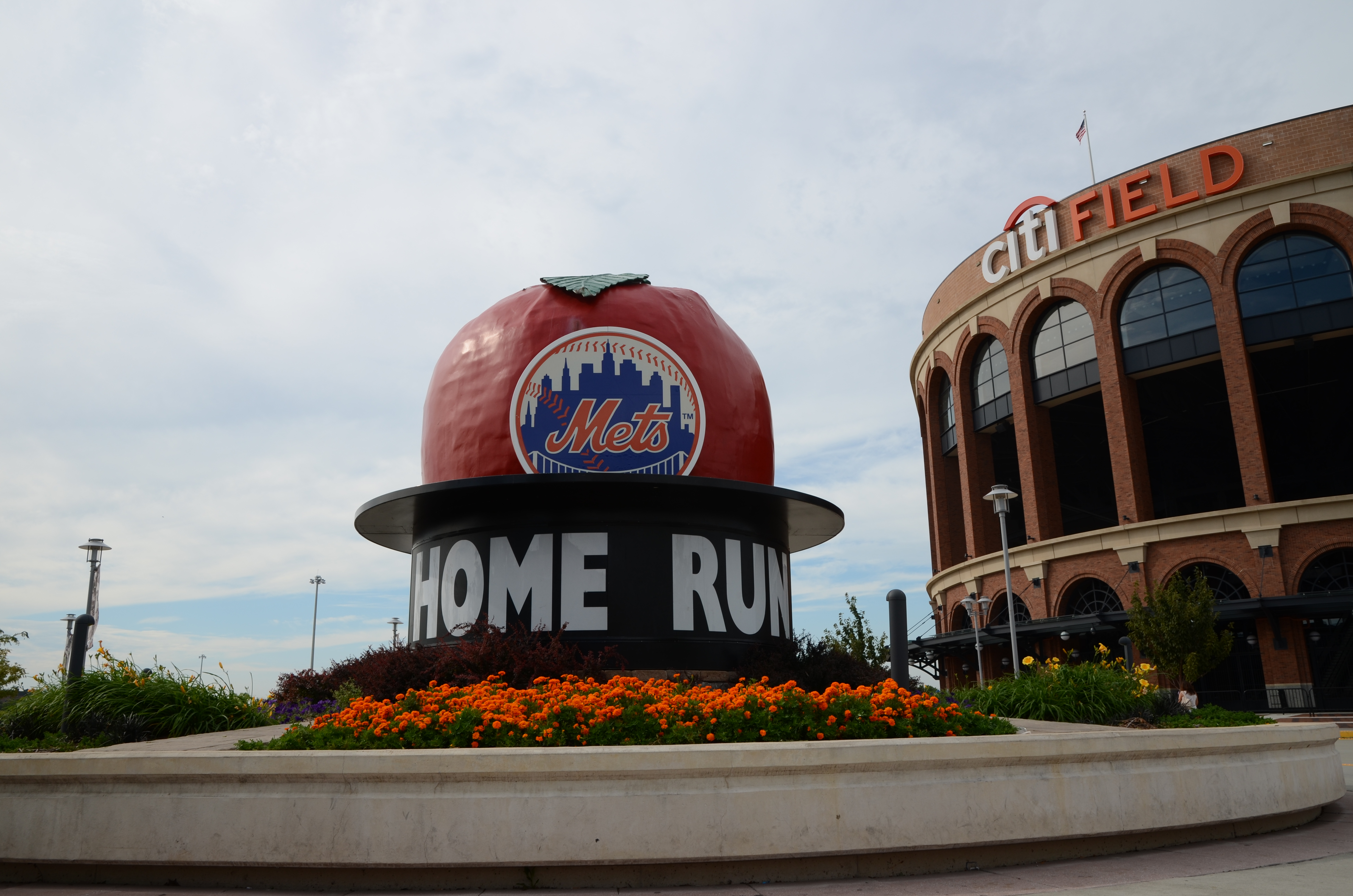
A model of a big apple is located outside of Citi Field, the New York Mets' baseball ballpark, in Queens.

During its four-century history, New York City has been known by a variety of alternative names and euphemisms, both officially and unofficially. Frequently shortened to simply "New York", "NY", or "NYC", New York City is also known as "The City" in some parts of the Eastern United States, in particular, the State of New York and surrounding U.S. states. New Yorkers also use "The City" to refer specifically to the borough of Manhattan.

== Common nicknames ==
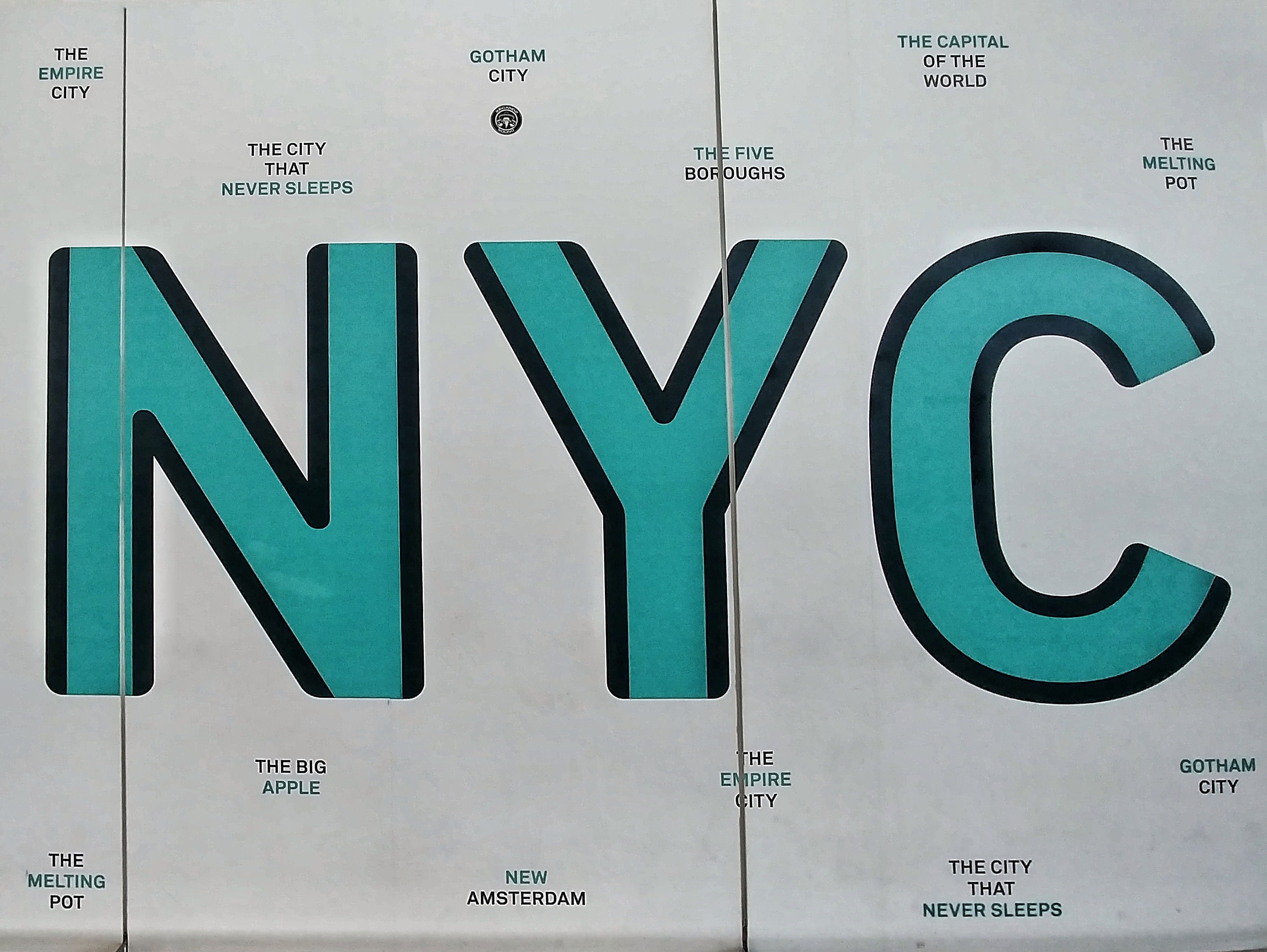
Various nicknames are featured on a wall at John F. Kennedy International Airport.

- The Big Apple – first published as a euphemism for New York City in 1921 by sportswriter John J. Fitz Gerald, who claimed he had heard it used the year prior by two stable hands at the New Orleans Fair Grounds because of the large prizes available at horse races in New York. Later made popular by a 1970s advertisement campaign.
- The Capital of the World – made popular in its application to New York by the author E. B. White in his 1948 essay Here is New York, written as construction of the United Nations headquarters began that year. Derived in turn from the Roman poet Lucan who first mocked his city of Rome as "Caput Mundi" in the year 61 in his work Pharsalia because of how easily it had fallen to generals the previous century. Also used with adjectives such as "The Food Capital of the World" or "The Gay Capital of the World", in reference to New York City's outsized influence upon specific cultures.
- The Center of the Universe – used repeatedly by New York City mayor Robert F. Wagner Jr. during his terms from 1954 to 1965, it is also commonly applied to Times Square specifically, and similarly used with adjectives such as the "Theatrical Center of the Universe" or "Economic Center of the Universe"
- The City So Nice They Named It Twice – a reference to "New York, New York" as both the city and state, spoken by Jon Hendricks in 1959 on a jazz cover of Lorenz Hart and Richard Rodgers' song "Manhattan" on George Russell's album New York, N.Y., and popularized by New York-based late night talk show host David Letterman, who also used the phrase "the town so nice, they named it twice."
- The City That Never Sleeps – first recorded in full in newspaper articles in the early 1900s, including in 1907 in Phoenix, Arizona in reference to New York's evening mail delivery and in 1912 in Fort Wayne, Indiana about New York's new electric and gas lighting, though also recorded in similar forms in reference to the nightlife in neighborhoods like the Bowery as early as 1892 and likely in use during the 1880s. Made popular by John Kander and Fred Ebb's song "New York, New York" from the Martin Scorsese 1977 film of the same name and the 1980 cover of that song performed by Frank Sinatra.
- The Empire City – derived from George Washington in the alleged quote "Surely this is the seat of the empire!" though first published in an 1836 newspaper as "the Empire City of the New World"; also in reference to New York City's status as the most populous city in the State of New York, whose primary nickname is The Empire State.
- The Five Boroughs – a reference to the counties that consolidated into New York City in 1898, and often used to distinguish the city proper from Manhattan alone or the New York metropolitan area
- Gotham – first used by Washington Irving in his satirical periodical Salmagundi in November 1807 as an allusion to the tale of the Wise Men of Gotham, and made popular as Gotham City, the original location of Batman comics, first specified in December 1940's Batman #4, written by Bill Finger
- The Greatest City in the World – reflective of the city's overall global prominence, and popularized by the song "The Schuyler Sisters" from Lin-Manuel Miranda's 2015 musical Hamilton
- The Melting Pot – a reference to the wide variety of ethnicities and language groups in the city, and popularized by various authors including playwright Israel Zangwill in his 1908 play The Melting Pot
- Metropolis – popularized as the original location of Superman comics, first specified in September 1939's Action Comics #16, written by Jerry Siegel and Joe Shuster, and itself an allusion to the setting of the Fritz Lang film Metropolis (1927)

== Historic nicknames ==
- America's City – a term positioning New York City as emblematic of the country post 9/11, as its premier metropolis
- Fear City – This nickname was created by the NYPD's largest police union, who used the term in response to city budget cutbacks during the 1970s. It was also a play on the earlier New York City nickname "Fun City".
- Fun City – taken from a phrase in 1966 uttered by then mayor John Lindsay in response to being asked if he still liked being mayor during a crippling transit strike.
- Mamdanistan – referring to the city under Mayor Zohran Mamdani.
- The Modern Gomorrah – referring to the "sinfulness" and organized crime of Manhattan, first popularized by Reverend Thomas De Witt Talmage in 1875 at the Brooklyn Tabernacle

== Historical names ==
Names by which the parts of New York City in Lower Manhattan were officially deemed during the 17th century included:

- New Amsterdam – the original name of the Dutch colony from 1624 until 1665, when the English captured and renamed the colony during the Second Anglo-Dutch War. Derived from Fort Amsterdam, and though the colony's administration at the time simply used the name "Amsterdam" for the village north of the fort, the inclusion of "Nieuw" was popularized in the 1650s by Adriaen van der Donck in his pamphlets advertising the colony to potential settlers.
- New Orange – the name given to the city during the brief period of 1673–1674 when the Dutch regained control of the city after the Third Anglo-Dutch War and then bargained it away in the Treaty of Westminster.

== See also ==
- Nicknames of Boston
- Nicknames of Philadelphia
