= Florida Museum of Photographic Arts =

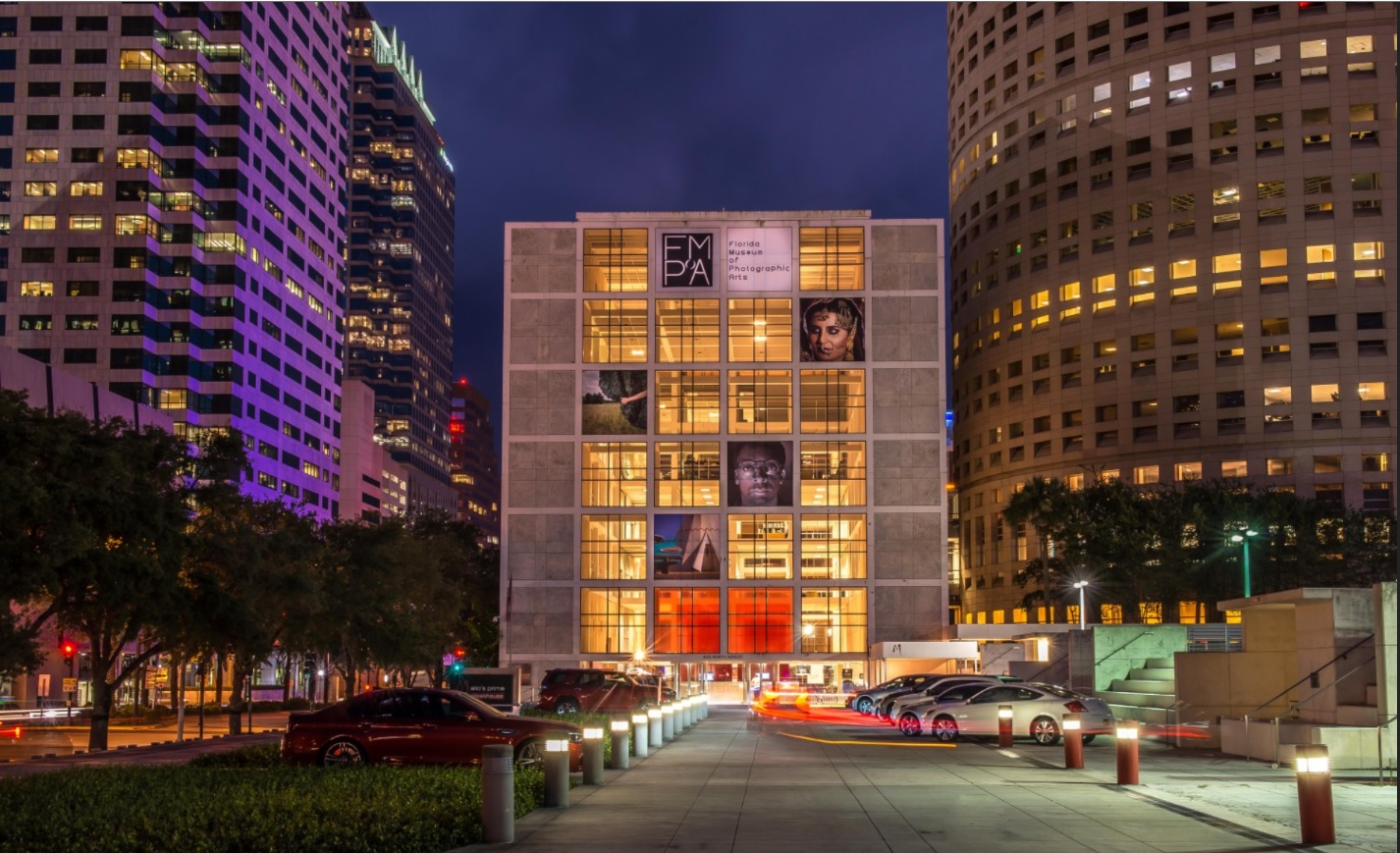
- Former location at 400 N Ashley Dr in Tampa, c. 2015
- Former name: Tampa Gallery of Photographic Arts
- Established: 2001
- Location: 1630 E 7th Avenue Ybor, Tampa FL, 33605
- Type: Photography Museum
- Website: www.fmopa.org

The Florida Museum of Photographic Arts (FMoPA) is a museum dedicated to exhibiting photographic art as central to contemporary life and culture. The museum was founded in 2001 by Cynthia L. Flowers, Charles J. Levin, and Vincent Sorrentino. It began in a storefront in Old Hyde Park Village in Tampa, Florida. Sorrentino, a New York art dealer who was then living in Tampa, curated many of the organization's early exhibitions.

In addition to its exhibitions, FMoPA offers educational and community programs for adults and youth. The museum's activities have included photography courses, outreach initiatives, the Annual Members' Show, and the International Photography Competition. In 2023, the museum relocated to Ybor City.

== Permanent collection ==
The photographic works in the growing permanent collection include a suite of Harold Edgerton's works using his invention, the strobe light. Also in the collection are Len Prince's celebrity portraits, a notable Dorothea Lange, a portrait of Ansel Adams by Judy Dater, scenes of Pittsburgh by Charles "Teenie" Harris and a body of work by Dianora Niccolini, a pioneer in the photographing of the male nude. The female nude is well represented in a work by Ruth Bernhard. Burk Uzzle's iconic Woodstock scenes as well as Bud Lee's unforgettable views of the 1960s and 1970s counterculture document important moments in American history. More historical moments are found in an expanding collection of panoramic (or "Cirkut") photographs taken in the early 20th century, including views of the construction of the Panama Canal and of early Tampa history.

== Partnerships ==
The Florida Museum of Photographic art is currently partnered with Arts Council of Hillsborough County, the University of Tampa, and the Tampa Bay Times Forum. The Arts Council helps promote the museum and provides funds to support the museum and all its work. The University of Tampa works with the museum to support their Cultural Outreach Partners program. The program encourages students from the university to visit the museum and appreciate the art by providing free access to the art venues.

== Accreditation ==
The museum is accredited by the American Alliance of Museums.

== Exhibitions ==
- Masters of Black & White Exhibition, May 4 – July 1, 2001
- Faces and Places: One Man Show by Herb Snitzer, September 9 – October 28, 2001
- War and Peace: World War II, December 8, 2001 – January 27, 2002
- The Photography of Peter B. Kaplan, March 23 – June 2, 2002
- Post 9-11: Slices of Life from Countries Once Foreign, September 6 – October 27, 2002
- Clyde Butcher Retrospective, November 2, 2002 – January 5, 2003
- Berenice Abbott: American Photographer: A Fantastic Passion, February 1 – March 30, 2003
- Black Culture Viewed Through the Lens, May 2 – June 29, 2003
- Stopping Time: Photographs of Harold Edgerton, September 13 – October 26, 2003
- Hard Won Dreams: the American Southwest: Photographs of Bruce Dale, November 8, 2003 – January 11, 2004
- Abstractions and the Neo-Cubist Order: Photographs of Barbara Kasten, February 7 – April 18, 2004
- Cut, Edit and Embellish – A Life in Collage: an Exhibition of Photography by Hugh Shurley, October 16, 2004 – January 2, 2005
- Caterpillar’s Conundrum: The Photographic Investigations of Todd Watts, February. 18 – April 17, 2005
- In Sight: Images from Our Children’s Program, May 20 – July 9, 2005
- One Shot Harris: The Photographys of Charles "Teenie" Harris, September 24, 2005 – January 29, 2006
- No Man’s Land The Photography of Lynne Cohen, March 17 – May 21, 2006
- Eyes of A Child: Images from Our Children’s Literacy through Photography Program, June 9–23, 2006
- Aaron Siskind: A Harlem Document (1932–1940), September 15 – November 5, 2006
- Technology Into Art: The Photogravure from 1850 to Today, November 10, 2006 – January 28, 2007
- Tom Abercrombie: National Geographic Photographer, February 2 – April 15, 2007
- Face to Face: Judy Dater’s Portraits from Italy and California, April 20, 2007 – June 15, 2007
- Florida Showcase, August 10 – September 8, 2007
- Cuba: Selected Works of Clyde Butcher and Maria Martinez-Canas, September 18 – November 10, 2007
- Cuba Particular: (Private Cuba) The Photography of David Audet, September 18 – November 10, 2007
- Life in Cuba: Photographs from the personal collections of area families, September 18 – November 10, 2007
- Eye in the Sky: The Works of Robert Hartman, November 16, 2007 – January 9, 2008
- The Magic Box of Abelardo Morell and Panoramic Views of the Past: Cirkut Photographs by the Burgert Brothers, January 2008
- Masters of Black and White: Including selections from the Drapkin Collection, April 2008
- Masks & Identity: Len Prince in the Collection of William K. Zewadski, June 2008
- Eyes of A Child: Summer Showcase, June 12 – 28, 2008
- Graciela Iturbide: The Spirits of the Earth, September 18 – November 8, 2008.
- Twice Exposed: Photographic & Print works from the Permanent Collection of the USF Contemporary Art Museum, November 20, 2008
- NFL History from Getty Images, January 22 – February 26, 2009
- My Neighborhood, February 3 – 14, 2009
- Contemporary Chinese Photography, March 12 – May, 2009
- The Disappeared: Native American Images from the Drapkin Collection, May 21, 2009
- Eyes of A Child: Summer Showcase, July 11–25, 2009
- Burk Uzzle’s Woodstock and Other Americana, September 17, 2009
- Flashback: Photos from the Tampa Bay Community, September 17, 2009
- Andrea Modica: Flights of the Soul, November 2009
- August Sander, the Twentieth Century Man / Jules Aarons, Views from the Street, January 2010
- Portraits of the Artists and Other Selections from the Collection of Robert and Elizabeth Sanchez, March 2010
- Infected Landscape: Works by Shai Kremer, May 27 – July 17, 2010
- R. Daniel Harnly Memorial Juried Student Showcase, May 27 – June 26, 2010
- Naked City: Photography from Vassar College’s Frances Lehman Loeb Art Center, January 2011
- Natural Fashion: Art and the Body, Photographs by Hans Silvester, February 10 – April 10, 2011
- Classic Images: Photography by Ansel Adams, April 28 – July 6, 2011
- Life and Death by Duane Michals, September 8 – November 6, 2011.
- Bud Lee's America & Celebration of the Body: The Works of Dianora Niccolini, November 17, 2011 – January 8, 2012
- Andy Warhol & Friends, March 10 – May 27, 2012
- The Secret Paris of the 1930s: Vintage Photographs by Brassaï, May 31 – August 19, 2012
- Portraits of Power: Photographs by Platon, August 23 – November 11, 2012
- Mario Algaze: Cuba 1999–2000, October 18 – January 27, 2013
- Dorothea Lange’s America, November 15 – January 27, 2013
- Chuck Close: A Couple Ways of Doing Something, January 31 – March 31, 2013
- Vivian Maier: Out of the Shadows, April 4 – June 16, 2013
- Edward S. Curtis Photogravures from the Collection of Deli Sacilotto, June 20 – September 8, 2013
- New Visions: Contemporary Artist Series, Featuring Edmund Fountain, Sissi Farassat, and Jim Reynolds, June 20 – September 8, 2013
- Frida & Friends: The Life and Times of Frida Kahlo, September 12 – November 10, 2013
- Exposing the Self: Photography and Surrealism, September 12 – November 10, 2013
- Gangsters, Pirates, & Cigars: A Photographic History of Tampa 1879–1955, November 15 – February 23, 2014
- David Hilliard: Intimacies, March 7 – May 18, 2014
- New Visions: Polly Gaillard and Allison Hunter, May 23 – August 31, 2014
- Ruth Bernhard: Body and Form, September 5 – December 28, 2014
- Elger Esser: Combray, October 6, 2014 – March 29, 2015
- Jim Reynolds: Cityscapes, April 1, 2015 – June 30, 2015
- Vaiven: Six Visual Journeys between Spain and the US, October 2, 2015 – November 30, 2015
- Faces of Alzheimer's, January 2, 2016 – March 1, 2016
- Sandra Gottlieb: Earth and Water, January 2, 2016 – March 25, 2016
- Gohar Dashti: Iran Untitled and Stateless, January 2, 2016 – June 1, 2016
- Danny Lyon: People, April 1, 2016 – June 30, 2016
- Shai Kremer: Concrete Abstract, June 3, 2016 – September 25, 2016
- Jerry Uelsmann: Undiscovered Self, July 2016 – December 2016
- There is a Light that Never Goes Out: Wendy Babcox, Jason Lazarus, Noelle Mason, September 2016 – December 2016
- Lynn Saville: Dark City, October 21, 2016 – November 20, 2016
- By the Yard: Cirkut Camera Photography, January – December 2017
- Linda Connor: Gravity, January 16, 2017 – March 31, 2017
- The Boomer List: Photographs by Timothy Greenfield-Sanders, April 28, 2017 – June 8, 2017
- She Loves Me, She Loves Me Not, June 10, 2017 – September 10, 2017
- Under the Cuban Sun, September 22, 2017 – December 31, 2017
- Chris Buck: Magnificent Hurt, January 26, 2018 – March 16, 2018
- Roger Steffens: The Family Acid, January 26, 2018 – March 16, 2018
- Jean Pagliuso: Poultry, Raptors, Places of Ritual, January 26, 2018 – March 16, 2018
- Andrea Modica: Minor League and Best Friends, April 1, 2018 – June 30, 2018
- Patty Carroll: Anonymous Women: Camouflage and Calamity, April 1, 2018 – June 30, 2018
- Cathy Dutertre: Quest, May 1 – 31, 2018
- Bruce Dale: Beyond the Lens, July 1 – September 30, 2018
- City of Tampa Photographer Laureates 2003–2013, July 1 – September 30, 2018
- Day by Day: 1968, October 1 – December 30, 2018
- North and South: Berenice Abbott’s U.S. Route 1. October 8, 2018 – January 11, 2019
- Modus Operandi: Contemporary Photography from the collection of BNY Mellon, January 15 – April 15, 2019
- Lost and Found in America, January 21 – April 22, 2019
- Olivia Parker: Vanishing in Plain Sight, April 21 – August 31, 2019
- Viktor Fresno: Mirroring Me, May 10 – June 15, 2019
- United Photographic Artists Gallery, August 1 – September 7, 2019
- 2019 Members Show, September – October 2019
- Reframed, September – December 2020
- Bruce Davidson: New York, September – December 2020
- Garry Winogrand: Women are Beautiful, September 8, 2019 – January 5, 2020
- Stephen Wilkes: Day to Night, September 1, 2019 – January 12, 2020
- Roger Ballen: In Retrospect, January 10 – April 26, 2020
- Griff Davis and Langston Hughs, Letters and Photographs 1947-1967: A Global Friendship, January 17 - April 19, 2020
- Portals of Intent - FROM EARTH, March 2 - May 3, 2020
- The Eye of the Storm (relating to police brutality, institutionalized racism, and the 2020 Black Lives Matter movement), August 2020
- 2020 Members Show, September - October, 2020
- 8th Annual United Photographic Artists Gallery, November 2020
- Jeff Whetstone: Batture Ritual, January - September 2021
- Bremner Benedict – Hidden Waters / Desert Springs / Uncertain Future, January - September 2021
- Noelle Mason: X-Ray Vision vs Invisibility, February - September 5, 2021
- Picture (im)Perfect, April 16 - May 31, 2021.
- Scott Bolendz: Against the Sea and Dark Mountains, August 6 - September 12, 2021.
- Sea to Shining Sea: Photographs from the Permanent Collection, September 10, 2021 - January 23, 2022
- Astrid Reischwitz: The Fabric of Memory, September 24, 2021 - February 13, 2022.
- At Table - Glenna Jennings, September 24, 2021 - February 13, 2022.
- 2021 Members Show, September 17 - October 31, 2021.
- 9th Annual United Photographic Artists Gallery, November 5 - December 5, 2021.
- Benefit Sale, December 10, 2021 - January 30, 2022.
- Suzanne Williamson: The Language of Light, February 4 - April 3, 2022.
- The Landscape Architecture Legacy of Dan Kiley, February 18 - April 10, 2022.
- Forever Young, April 8 - June 17, 2022.
- The Company We Keep: Photographs of Our Complex Relationships with Animals, April 15 - July 3, 2022.
- Suzanne Camp Crosby: The Art of Life, June 3 - September 25, 2022.
- 2022 International Photography Competition, June 10 - July 17, 2022.
- Through the Lens of Conflict: Vietnam Press Photographs from the Dr. Robert L. Drapkin Collection, July 8 - October 23, 2022.
- 10th Annual United Photographic Artists Gallery, September 16 - November 6, 2022.
- Shane Brown: In the Territories and Reservation Dogs, September 30 - January 19, 2023.
- Transformations: A Gender Exploration by Mariette Pathy Allen, October 28 - January 19, 2023.
- Icons of Black and White, September 14 - December 3, 2023.
- Carlton Ward Jr: Path of the Panther, December 7 - March 17, 2023.
- UPAG, January 16 - February 18, 2024.
- HOPE Photovoice Initiative, February 20 - March 24, 2024.
- Joel Meyerowitz, Confluence, 1964-1984, March 24 - July 7, 2024.
- Gary Monroe: Life in South Beach, 1977-1986, March 26 - May 19, 2024.
- Through Their Lens: A Journey of Self-Exploration, May 21- June 16, 2024.
- Thomas Sayers Ellis - SP Photo Laureate: Paradise | Paradise Layered, June 18 - Aug 4, 2024.
- 2024 International Photography Competition @ TPA, June 25 - August 25
- Photo Ybor: Then and Now, July 11－November 7, 2024.
- TutuTango: A Photographic Ballet in Four Acts, August 6 – September 15, 2024.
- Fandom: Celebrating Rock & Roll with Jay Nolan and Davy Alder, Nov 21, 2024 – April 6, 2025.
- José Ney Milà Espinosa: Land Land Land, January 14 – February 16, 2025.
- Barbara Peacock: American Bedroom, February 18 – March 23, 2025.
- 2nd Annual Through Their Lens: A Journey of Self-Exploration, March 25, April 27, 2025.
- The Hutterites: In the World but Not of It, April 10 – June 29, 2025.
- Ric Savid - SP Photo Laureate: Darkroom Silver Linings, May 1 – June 1, 2025.
- Another Weeping Woman: Photographs by Diana Sosnowska, June 3 – July 13, 2025.
- Here For Now, July 3 – October 5, 2025.
- 2025 International Photography Competition, July 15 – September 7, 2025.
- 963 Hz: The Interstitial Moment Between Image and Sound, September 9 – October 26, 2025.
- A Sublime Obsession: Photographs from the Hazlitt Collection, October 9, 2025 – January 11, 2026.
- The Soldier’s Lens, October 28 – January 25, 2025.
- 25th Annual Member’s Show, January 27 – March 15, 2026
- Dimpy Bhalotia: Small Lens, Big World, January 15 – April 5, 2026
- Beth Belaschky: Echoes of the Luminous, March 17–April 26, 2026
- Cigars! Photography, Industry, and Identity, April 9 – July 19, 2026
- SPMOP Photo Laureate Exhibition: Jesi Cason: ALT Tampa, April 29 – June 14, 2026
- 2026 International Photo Competition, June 16–August 2, 2026
- Exposure: 25 Years of FMoPA. Highlights from the Permanent Collection, July 23–DEc. 6, 2026
- Through Their Lens: A Journey of Self-Exploration, August 4–Sept. 20, 2026

== Outreach ==
The museum has many outreach programs such as a collaboration with the Girl Scouts, working with the Little Kids, Big Minds children's program, and a photography benefit sale. They have many collaborations with organizations such as the Smithsonian, Wellness and Community, and the Tampa International Gay and Lesbian Film Festival. The museum offers classes on different types of photography such as, analog photography, basic photography, creative photography, photographs of people and places, product photography, and smartphone and social media.

== Online exhibitions ==
The museum offers two online exhibitions, the Veterans Exhibition and the 10th Annual International Photography Competition. For the Veterans Exhibition the museum worked with Hillsborough County Public Library to show photographs showing the experience of veterans who have returned to civilian life. The exhibition is to help with the healing process of the veterans. The second exhibition, the 10th Annual International Photography Competition, showcases. Many different types of art and a competition was conducted to name the winner in each category. Some of the categories included were still life, people/portraits, places/landscapes/drones, and abstract photography.
