= 54th Street (Manhattan) =

West-east street in Manhattan, New York

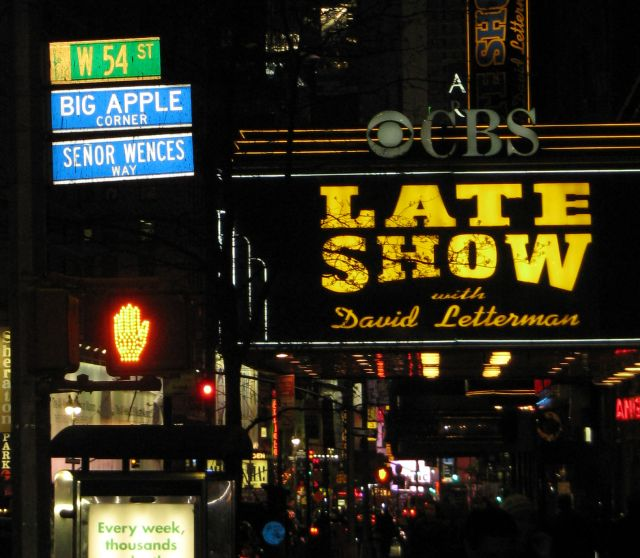
- 54th and Broadway
- Maintained by: City of New York
- Length: 2.0 mi (3.2 km)
- Location: Manhattan, New York City, New York, United States
- West end: NY 9AWest Side Highway
- East end: Sutton Place

54th Street is a two-mile-long (3.2 km), one-way street traveling west to east across Midtown Manhattan in New York City.

== Notable places, west to east ==
=== Twelfth Avenue ===
- The route begins at Twelfth Avenue (New York Route 9A). Opposite the intersection is the New York Passenger Ship Terminal and the Hudson River. This is the only two-way portion of 54th Street; the remainder (east of Eleventh Avenue) is one-way eastbound.
- De Witt Clinton Park. The West Side neighborhood of Clinton derives its name from the park. (south)

=== Eleventh Avenue ===
- Clinton Towers Apartments, 39-floor apartment building completed in 1974 (north)
- Harborview Terrace, Building 2 in New York City Housing Authority complex (north)
- The Nightly Show with Larry Wilmore studios
- AT&T Switching Center at 811 Tenth Avenue, 21-story, 113 m/370 ft switching station completed in 1964 (south)

=== Tenth Avenue ===
- Sony Music Studios, 460 West 54th (south)
- The Hit Factory, 421 West 54th (north)

=== Ninth Avenue ===
- New York City Transit Rapid Transit Division's Rail Command Control Center, on former site of 54th Street Bus Depot and Ninth Avenue Railroad barn at 354 West 54th (south)
- Midtown Community Court (south)
- Midtown North precinct of New York City Police (south)

=== Eighth Avenue ===
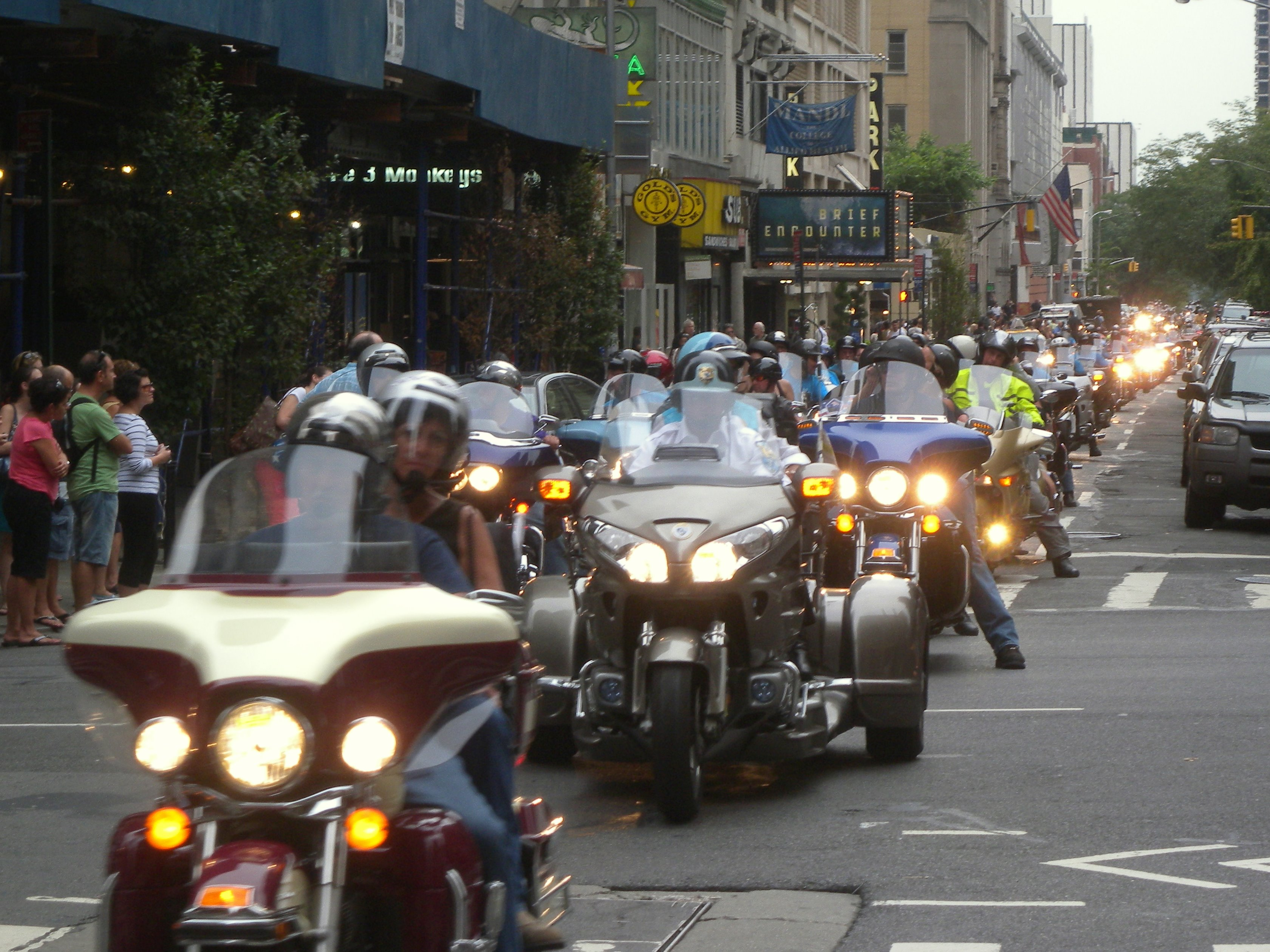
Motorcycle parade on West 54th

- The section between Eighth and Broadway is signed Señor Wences Way, for the ventriloquist who had appeared on The Ed Sullivan Show (produced nearby) and who lived in the Ameritania Hotel.
- The Marc, 260 West 54th, 42-floor, 142 m / 464 ft apartment tower on top of municipal garage (south)
- Studio 54 (south)
- Ameritania Hotel (south)

=== Broadway ===
- The corner of Broadway and 54th is signed "Big Apple Corner" in honor of writer John J. Fitz Gerald who lived there and popularized the phrase Big Apple.
- 1700 Broadway, 42-story, 162 m / 533 ft office tower that is headquarters of King World Productions

=== Seventh Avenue ===
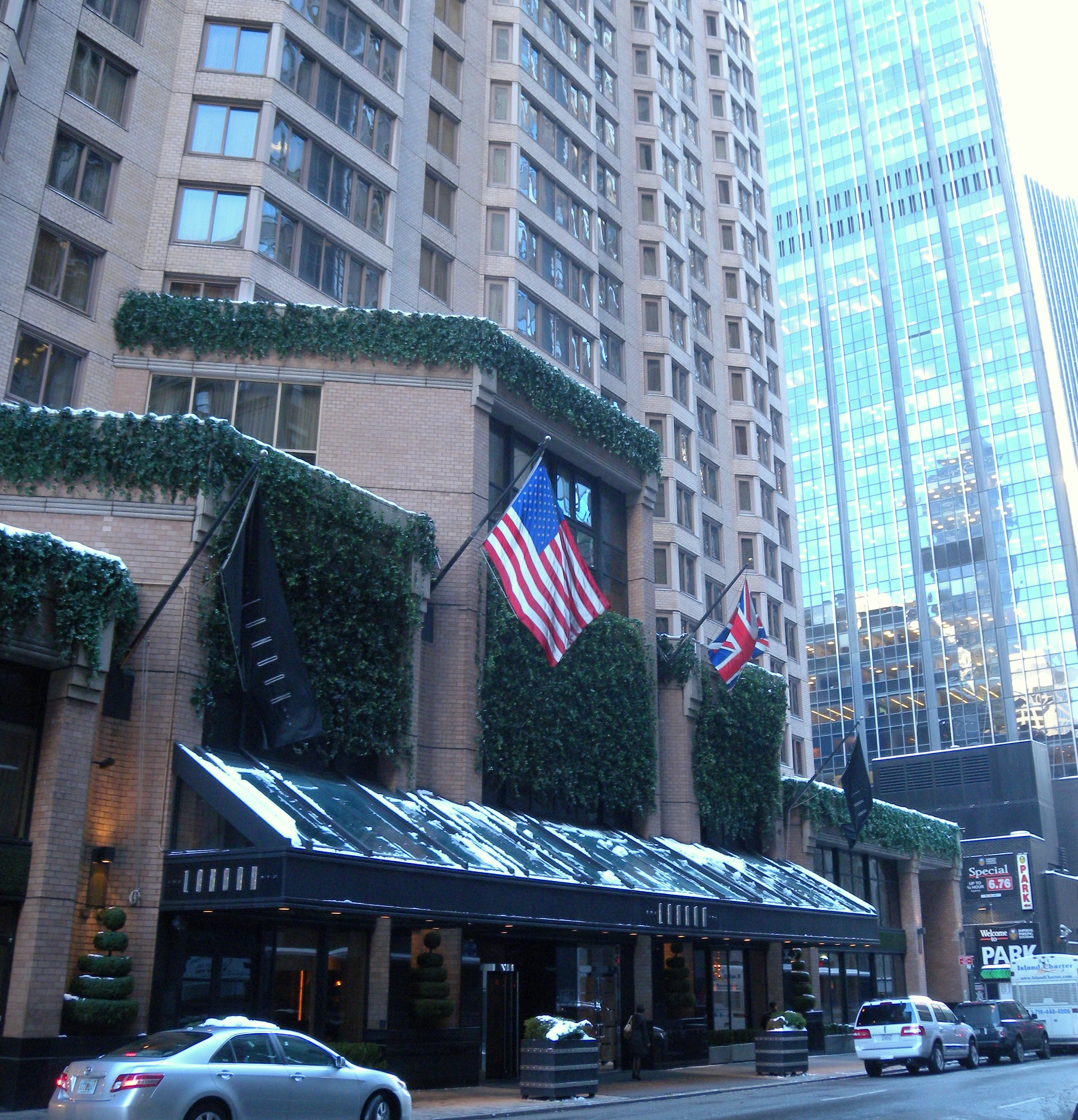
The London NYC

- 1325 Avenue of the Americas (north) (actually closer to Seventh Avenue) 35-story 153 m / 502 ft, is the office tower that was portrayed in Seinfeld as Elaine's workplace. It is connected to the Hilton Hotel. (south)
- Conrad (formerly The London NYC), 54-floor 180m/590 ft mixed-use tower; tallest building on West 54th (north)
- Ziegfeld Theatre (north)
- New York Hilton Hotel, 49-floor, 148 m 487 ft (148 m) hotel completed in 1963. Designed by Lapidus, it was originally supposed to resemble Miami Beach's curved Fontainebleau Hotel, but was later changed to resemble the nearby New York Sheraton which Lapidus had also designed. (south)
- 1345 Avenue of the Americas, 50-story, 191 m / 625 ft office tower (north)

=== Sixth Avenue ===
- Residences at 5-15 West 54th Street
- U.S. National Register of Historic Places
- U.S. Historic district
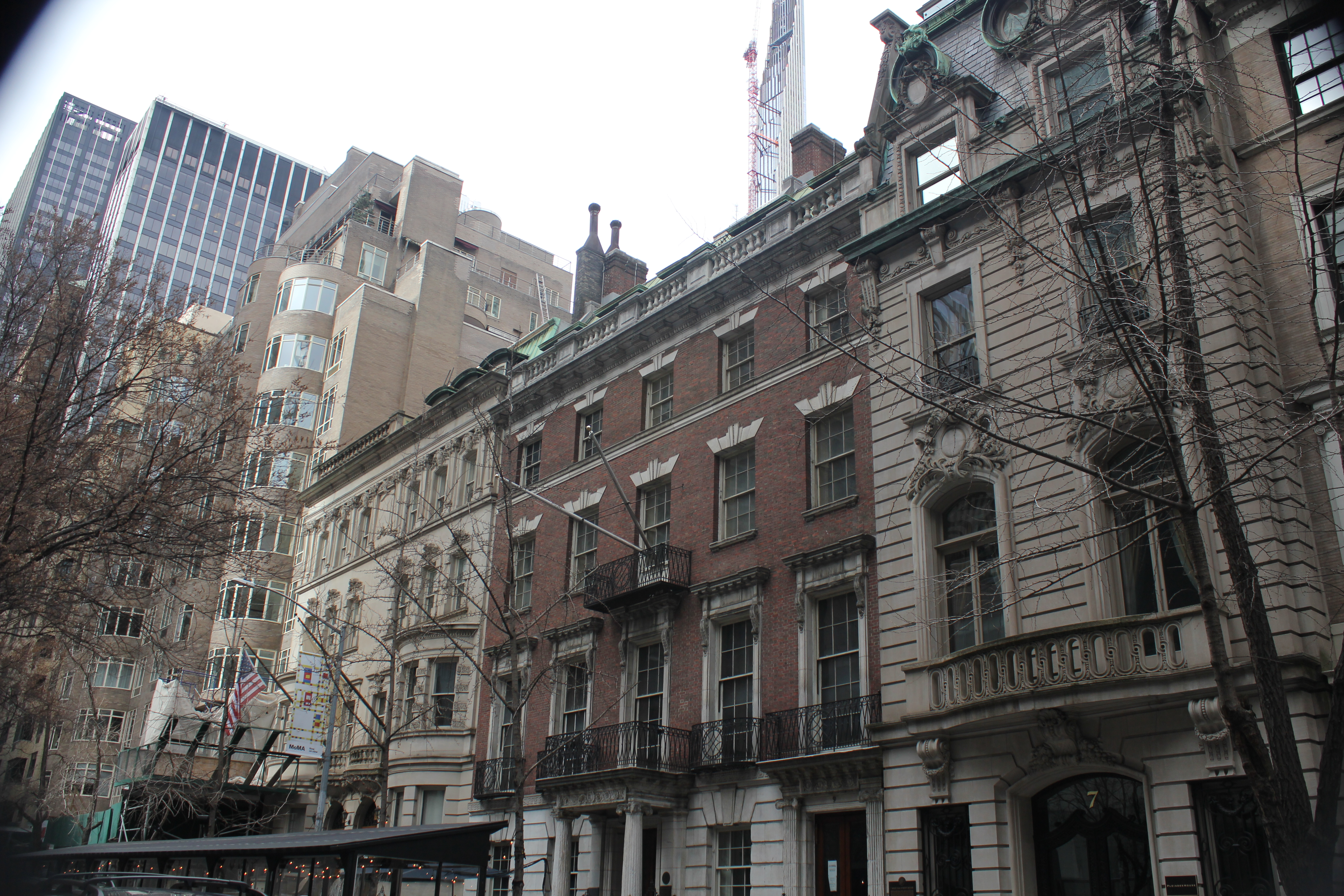

- Location within Manhattan
- Location: 5-15 W. 54th St., New York, New York
- Coordinates: 40°45′42″N 73°58′35″W
- Area: less than one acre
- Architect: Multiple: Henry Janeway Hardenbergh (13 and 15 West 54th Street); McKim, Mead & White (11 West 54th Street); John H. Duncan (7 West 54th Street); R. H. Robertson (5 West 54th Street)
- Architectural style: Colonial Revival, Classical Revival, Beaux Arts
- NRHP reference No.: 89002260
- Added to NRHP: January 4, 1990

- 1330 Sixth Avenue, called "Brown Rock" when it was headquarters of ABC Television (south)
- Financial Times Building, 41-story, 151 m / 496 ft office tower completed in 1965 (south)
- The Warwick Hotel, 36-story, 111 m / 363 ft hotel completed in 1927 (north)
- Tower Verre, an under-construction 77-story, 320 m / 1,050 ft tower at 53 West 53rd Street (south)
- Museum of Modern Art (south)
- Museum Tower 52-story588 ft (179 m) Cesar Pelli tower completed in 1985
- Rockefeller Apartments, a New York City landmark
- Residences at 5–15 West 54th Street, a series of townhouses built in the late 1890s. All of these are New York City designated landmarks and collectively form a National Register of Historic Places district called the Residences at 5-15 West 54th Street.
  - 13 and 15 West 54th Street occupied by John D. Rockefeller Jr. and Nelson Rockefeller
  - 9–11 West 54th Street, occupied by James J. Goodwin and Josephine Goodwin
  - 7 West 54th Street occupied by Philip Lehman and Robert Lehman
  - 5 West 54th Street, occupied by Moses Allen Starr and Alice Dunning Starr
- 4 West 54th Street, Mansion and Residence of John D. Rockefeller (now Museum of Modern Art)
- University Club (north)

=== Fifth Avenue ===
- 520 Madison Avenue, 43-story, 176 m / 577 ft office tower with sloping lower walls and a section of the Berlin Wall in its adjoining park (south)
- William H. Moore House, 4 East 54th Street (south)
- 689 Fifth Avenue (north)
- 19 East 54th Street (north)

=== Madison Avenue ===
- Dillon, Read & Company Building, 36-story 141 m /464 ft building completed in 1982
- 527 Madison, 26-story, 107 m 351 ft (107 m) building completed in 1986
- Hotel Elysee (south)

=== Park Avenue ===
- 399 Park Avenue, headquarter of Citigroup (south)
- Lever House (south)

=== Lexington Avenue ===
- Citigroup Center, tallest building on street (south)

=== Third Avenue ===
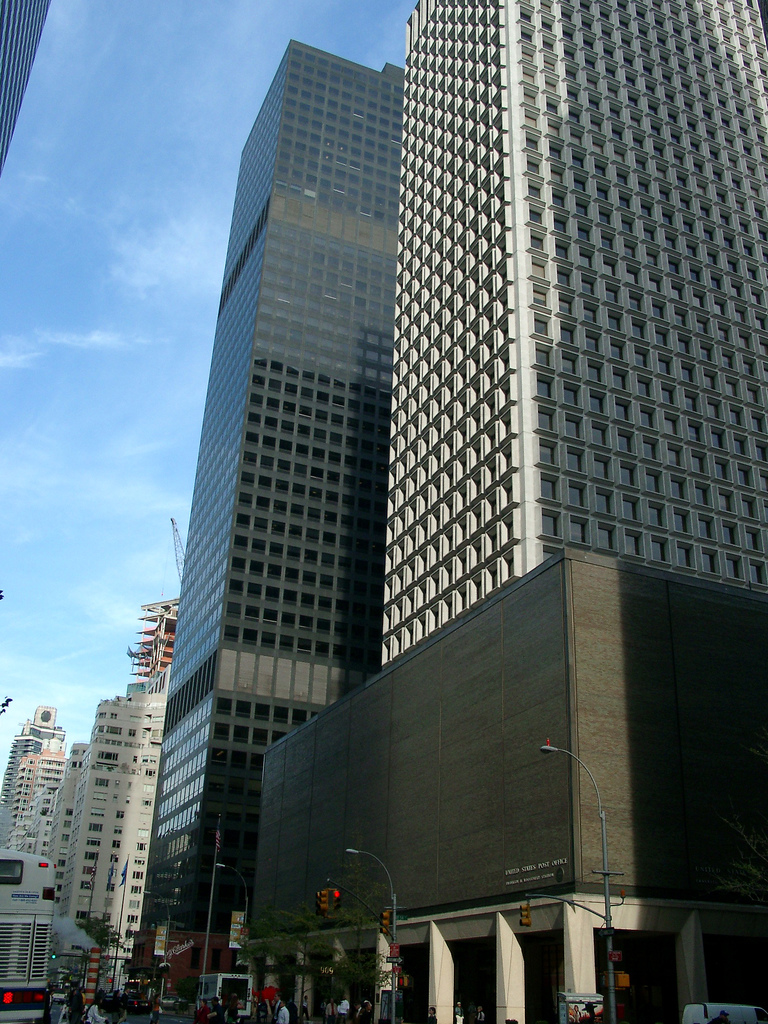
909 Third Avenue

- Lipstick Building (south)
- 909 Third Avenue, 32-floor tower built above the FDR Station (a post office) (north)
  - 40.758279°N 73.96786°W

=== Second Avenue ===
- Neighborhood Playhouse, 340 East 54th Street
- Constance Baker Motley Recreation Center
- Mondrian Condominiums, 43-story 134 m 439 ft (134 m) apartment complex completed in 1992

=== First Avenue ===
- Rivertower Apartments, 39-floor apartments (south)
- Saint James' Tower, 30-floor apartments

=== Sutton Place South ===
- The street ends at a cul-de-sac off Sutton Place South.
