= Wilda Gerideau-Squires =

African-American fine art photographer

- Born: June 21, 1946 (age 80)
- Education: College of DuPage
- Known for: Photography
- Website: www.wgsgallery.org

Wilda Gerideau-Squires (born June 21, 1946) is an African-American fine art photographer noted for her distinctive style of photography which includes abstract images created through the interplay of fabric and light, as well as her poignant photographs of women. In 2008, Women In Photography International named Gerideau-Squires among the world's most Distinguished Women Photographers. Her photographs are included in the Peter E. Palmquist Collection at Yale University's Beinecke Library, the State House Office Building in Boston and private collections in the United States and Canada.

== Life and career ==
Gerideau-Squires grew up in upstate New York and moved to Boston at 19. She graduated from the College of DuPage in 1974 majoring in Business Administration, and prior to becoming a photographer, Gerideau-Squires worked as a mid-level executive in the travel industry for 30 years.

Since 1992, she has lived in Andover, MA with her husband Walter Squires. She became a professional photographer in 2000, after taking the Studio Art Classes at the Museum of Fine Arts in Boston between 1996 and 1998.

Gerideau-Squires uses film and digital media to capture "human-interest and landscape images". By 2007, her focus transitioned into the abstract genre. Gerideau-Squires explains, "My abstract compositions are developed around common elements such as fabric and glass, ultimately evolving into what for me are evocative images they continually remind me that, no matter how mundane or simple, if we take the time to look, there is in everything an extraordinary element waiting to be discovered and appreciated. I find viewers appreciate the abstract nature of my work because it does encourage them to insinuate their own "voices" into my images, thus allowing them to experience a more personal connection with them.”

The Danforth Art Museum, the Griffin Museum of Photography and the Massachusetts State House in Boston have exhibited her work. Her works have been featured in magazines including the Merrimack Valley Magazine, Persimmon Tree Magazine, and ARTisSpectrum Magazine.

Her professional affiliations include the National Association of Women Artists, Cambridge Art Association, Professional Women Photographers, Pen and Brush, Women In Photography International and the Royal Photographic Society. She is a resident artist at Western Avenue Studios in Lowell, MA and serves on the Board of Advisors of the Brush Art Gallery and Studios.

== Awards ==
In 2008, Women In Photography International named Gerideau-Squires to their prestigious List of Distinguished Women Photographers that honors the accomplishments of dedicated working women photographers around the globe. In addition, she has been the recipient of numerous national and international awards. In 2007 her work was recognized in the Prix de la Photographie Paris and the Photography Masters Cup.
