= The Big Guava =

Nickname of Tampa, Florida, USA

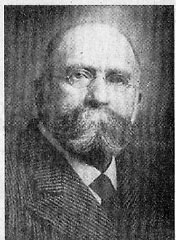
Gavino Gutierrez

The Big Guava is a nickname for Tampa, Florida, United States. It was coined in the 1970s by Steve Otto, long-time newspaper columnist for the Tampa Tribune and Tampa Times.

The moniker derives from a combination of New York's "Big Apple" nickname and a reference to businessman Gavino Gutierrez's unsuccessful quest for wild guava trees, which turned out to be vital to Tampa's growth and development.

== Origin ==
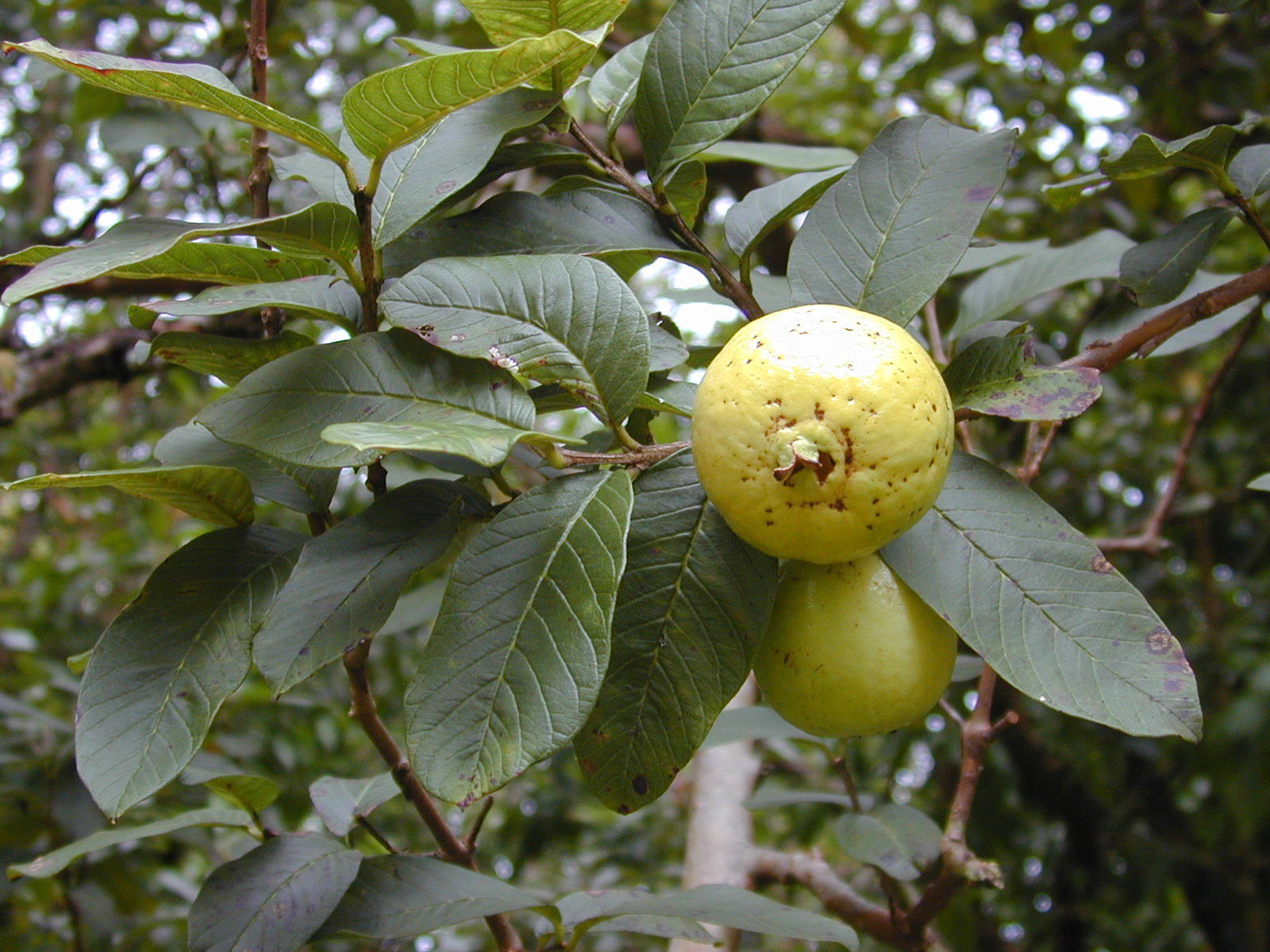
A backyard guava tree

In 1884, Gavino Gutierrez, a Spanish-American civil engineer by training who was working for a tropical fruit packing firm in New York, heard a rumor that wild guava trees were common near the Tampa Bay area on the west coast of Florida. Thinking that the fruit could be gathered and serve as a new product source for his company, Gutierrez accompanied the owner of his firm on a fact-finding mission to Tampa.

The rumor turned out to be false, as infrequent freezes usually prevent cold-sensitive guava trees from growing to maturity in central Florida. However, Gutierrez was nevertheless impressed by the economic potential of the village of Tampa (pop. about 1000), especially since Henry B. Plant was in the process of connecting the previously isolated town to the nation's railroad network.

Gutierrez returned to New York by sea, stopping along the way to visit his friend Vicente Martinez-Ybor, a major cigar manufacturer in Key West. Ybor had been looking for a place to move his operations, and Gutierrez recommended Tampa as a possibility. Ybor immediately visited the area and agreed with Gutierrez's assessment.

Within a year, Ybor and his partners purchased a large tract of land just northeast of Tampa for a company town to be called Ybor City. Gutierrez accepted Ybor's offer to be his company's civil engineer, and he planned and laid out the streets where thousands of immigrants would soon live and work, a community that has been initiated by his recommendation. By the turn of the 20th century, the sleepy village of Tampa had become one of Florida's largest cities and the "Cigar Capital of the World".

As Otto wrote when he introduced the nickname, "we owe it all to the guava".

== Related Events ==
Guavaween, an annual Halloween-themed event in Ybor City, gets its name from the city's nickname.

The Big Guava Music Festival is an annual music festival that features alternative bands.

== See also ==
- List of cities nicknamed after fruit
