= Dianora Niccolini =

Italian photographer

Dianora Niccolini (born October 1936, Florence, Italy) is a fine art photographer known for her photography of the male nude. She was President of Professional Women Photographers (PWP) from 1979 until 1984.

Niccolini's work has had multiple gallery showings and has been published in many magazines and over twenty anthologies. In November 2014, Emory University's Manuscript, Archives and Rare Book Library (MARBL) in Atlanta, Georgia acquired Niccolini's photographs, artwork, and papers.

== Biography ==
Dianora Niccolini is considered to be one of the pioneering fine arts photographers of the male nude. Although Niccolini's specialty was in photographing the male nude, at the time this was a style relegated to homosexual circles and was considered taboo at the time. In 1975, however, the Third Eye Gallery in New York City gave Niccolini a solo exhibition. The exhibition was titled The Male Nude. This was the first gallery exhibit of male nudes by anyone, and is thought to have legitimized and de-stigmatized the male nude in the art community. Her body studies have been included in many photographic anthologies and were also widely exhibited in the mid-seventies and pre-dated Mapplethorpe's images of body builders by several years.

Niccolini went on to be the first president Professional Women Photographers, serving from 1979 to 1984. Under her leadership, Professional Women Photographers became recognized as a leading professional organization for women photographers.

In early 2005, Niccolini began working with Mega Muscle Productions, a publisher of images of male fitness models. In 2011, the Florida Museum of Photographic Arts in Tampa, Florida, mounted a solo exhibition of Niccolini's photography. The exhibition, Celebration of the Body: The Works of Dianora Niccolini, ran from November 17, 2011 through January 8, 2012.

== Solo exhibitions ==
- 1974 Double Exposure, 209 Photo Gallery, New York City, NY
- 1974 The Female Nude, Third Eye Gallery, New York City, NY
- 1974 The Female Nude, Top Of The Stairs Gallery, New York City, NY
- 1975 The Male Nude, Third Eye Gallery, New York City, NY
- 1976 The Mona Lisa Series, Third Eye Gallery, New York City, NY
- 1977 Pop PhotArt, Third Eye Gallery, New York City, NY
- 1978 Pop PhotArt, Y Arts Council, Philadelphia, PA
- 1979 Monster Series, Floating Foundation of Photography, New York City, NY
- 1981 The Male Nude, Steve Bush Gallery, New York City, NY
- 1981 Photo Alterations, West Broadway Gallery, New York City, NY
- 1981 In Loving Memory, Photographics Unlimited Gallery, New York City, NY
- 1981 Emergency, The Camera Club, New York City, NY
- 1982 Men Watching, West Broadway Gallery, New York City, NY
- 1983 Men In Focus, Overseas Press Club, New York City, NY
- 1998 The Male Nude, Throckmorton Fine Art Gallery, New York City, NY
- 2001 Billy, Throckmorton Fine Art Gallery, New York City, NY
- 2003 Unmasking The Male, The Think Liquid Gallery, New York City, NY
