= Home Run Apple =

New York Mets home run symbol

Coordinates: 40.7577°N 73.8457°W

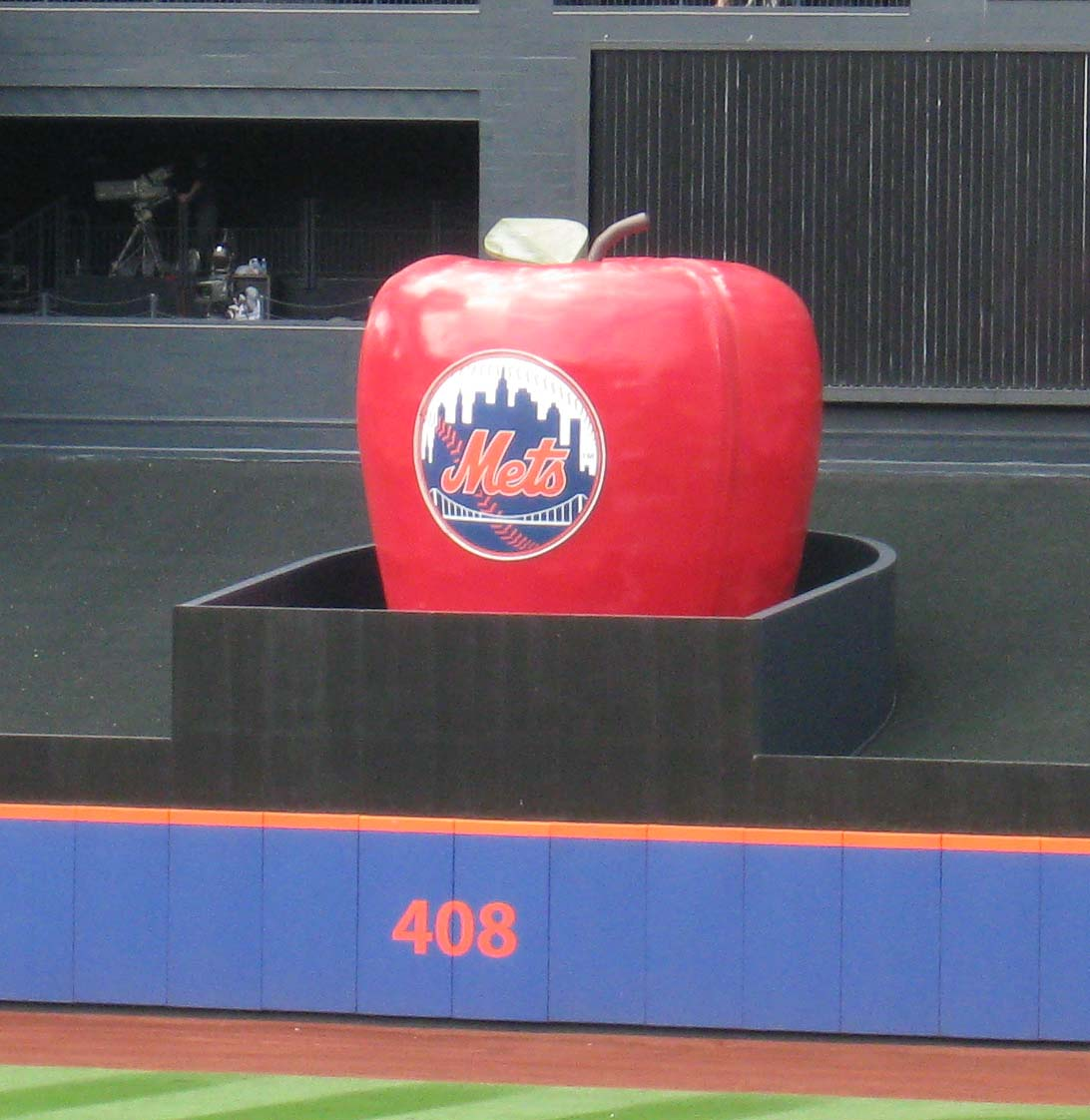
The Home Run Apple at Citi Field

The Home Run Apple is a motorized apple prop in the batter's eye at Citi Field in New York City, New York, United States; which rises whenever the New York Mets hit a home run there. The original, smaller apple was first installed in Shea Stadium in 1980 at the behest of Al Harazin with a replacement being installed at Citi Field upon that stadium's opening in 2009, the original apple being moved to the home plate entrance of Citi Field where it currently remains. The original is 9 feet (2.7 m) tall while the replacement is 18 feet (5.5 m) tall and 16 feet (4.9 m) wide.

== History ==
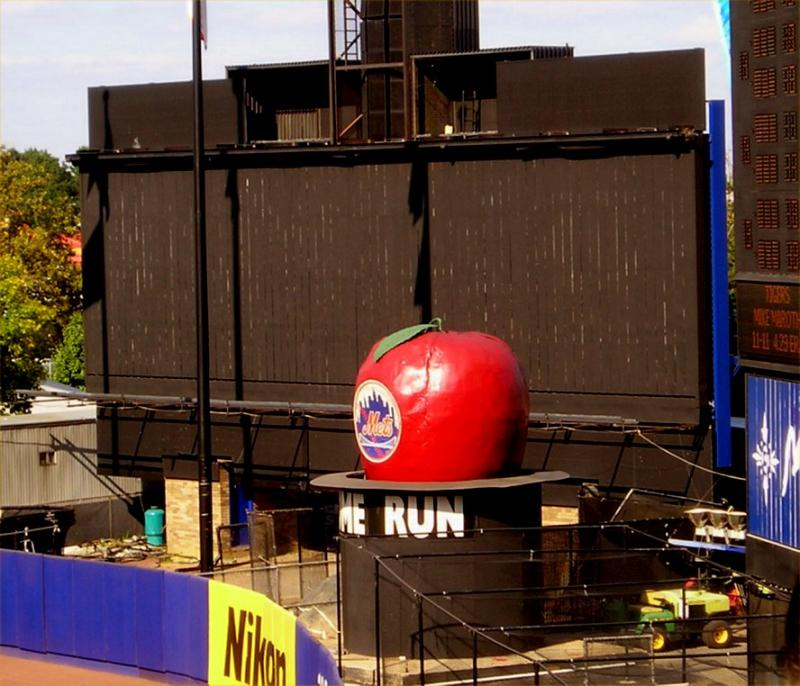
The Home Run Apple at Shea Stadium in 2007

The Home Run Apple was originally installed at Shea Stadium in 1980 as a way to improve the atmosphere at New York Mets games, and an apple was chosen as a play on New York City's nickname of the "Big Apple". When it was first constructed, it was made of fiberboard and came out of a top hat with the slogan "Mets Magic" (this was replaced a few years later with the words "Home Run"). However, the Mets won only 67 games during the 1980 season. Often the Apple would get stuck, which necessitated an electrician to be sent to repair it. Over time the Apple became misshapen (due to periodic harsh weather conditions) and was hard to maintain, with a Mets executive stating, "It was just totally fabricated out of plaster layered on top of a metal screen with a wood frame inside".

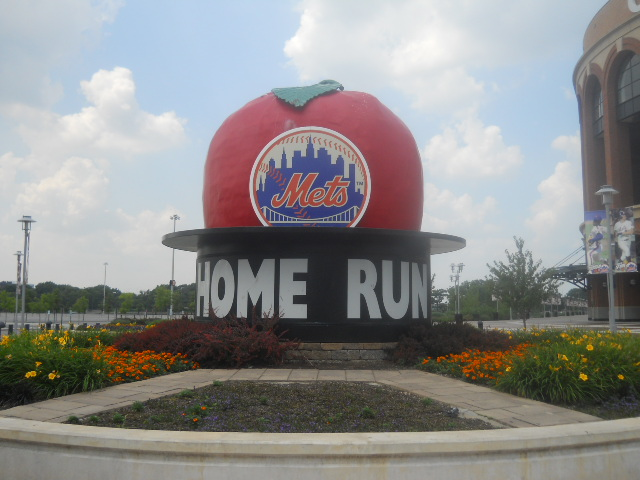
The original Apple outside Citi Field

In 2007, the Mets announced that the Home Run Apple would be retired. In response, Mets fans started a petition website called [savetheapple.com] in order to preserve the Apple. Due to popular demand, including 89% of surveyed fans stating they wanted it moved over from Shea Stadium, the Mets announced that they would construct a new Apple to be installed in Citi Field. The old Home Run Apple from Shea Stadium was installed outside Citi Field near the home plate entrance.

The Home Run Apple at Shea Stadium was operated using a motor and pulley-operated elevator mechanism, while the Apple at Citi Field is powered by hydraulics and is operated from the control room, which requires a key to be turned and button to be pressed to activate it. Despite the improved engineering on the new Apple, it is still susceptible to failure. In 2009 (Citi Field's first year), when Fernando Tatís hit a home run for the Mets, the Apple did not rise. The fans booed and chanted "We Want Apple!" for two and a half minutes until it was eventually raised. It happened again in 2017, when Travis d'Arnaud hit a home run, and the apple failed to rise, making Mets fans chant "We Want Apple!" again, just like in 2009. The Apple did rise two batters after d'Arnaud hit the home run.

== Baseball ==
During Major League Baseball games, the Home Run Apple is raised only for New York Mets home runs. An exception to this happened in 1998 when the Mets' Subway Series rivals, the New York Yankees, were forced to play one of their home games at Shea Stadium because of a building code violation at Yankee Stadium. During the game, former Mets player Darryl Strawberry hit a home run and the Apple was partially raised for him, stopping before the Mets insignia was exposed.

In 2015, after Travis d'Arnaud hit a home run that struck the Home Run Apple in Game 1 of the National League Championship Series, a bandage was placed on the apple the next day in the place the ball had hit it.

On June 1, 2024, the Home Run Apple was given a temporary makeover by adding green seed decals and a large green leaf decal, resembling a strawberry. The Mets logo was also replaced by a pinstriped "18" patch in honor of Darryl Strawberry, whose number was retired that day.
