= The City That Never Sleeps (nickname) =

Nickname for New York City and other cities

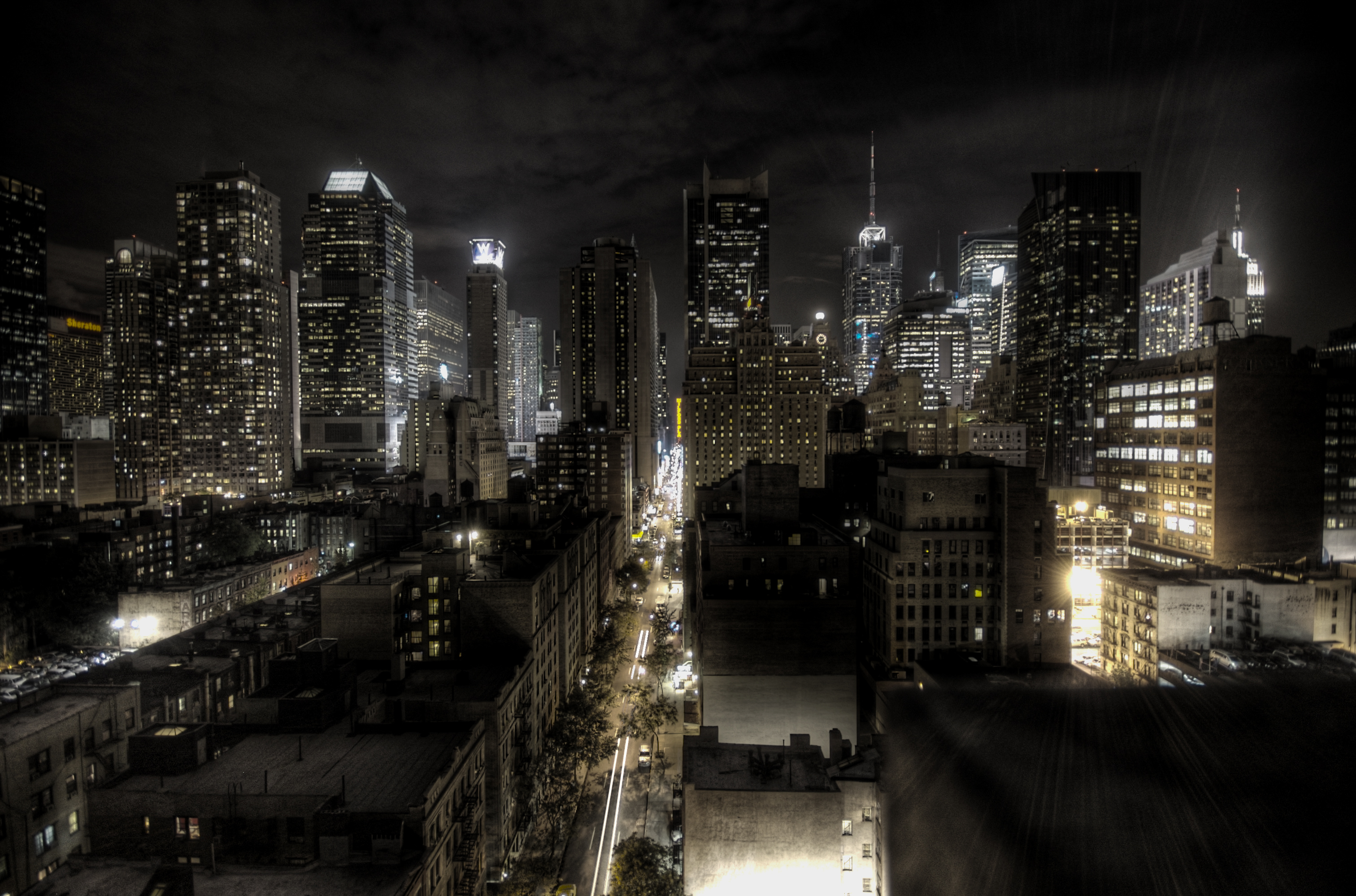
The skyline of New York City at night

The City That Never Sleeps is a ubiquitously used nickname and advertising slogan for New York City. Photographer Jacob Riis describes the Bowery as never sleeping in his 1898 book Out of Mulberry Street: Stories of Tenement Life in New York City. A September 6, 1912 newspaper article in Indiana's Fort Wayne Daily first nicknamed New York City as a whole as "The city that never sleeps.". It has also been applied to several other cities around the world.

== List of other cities ==
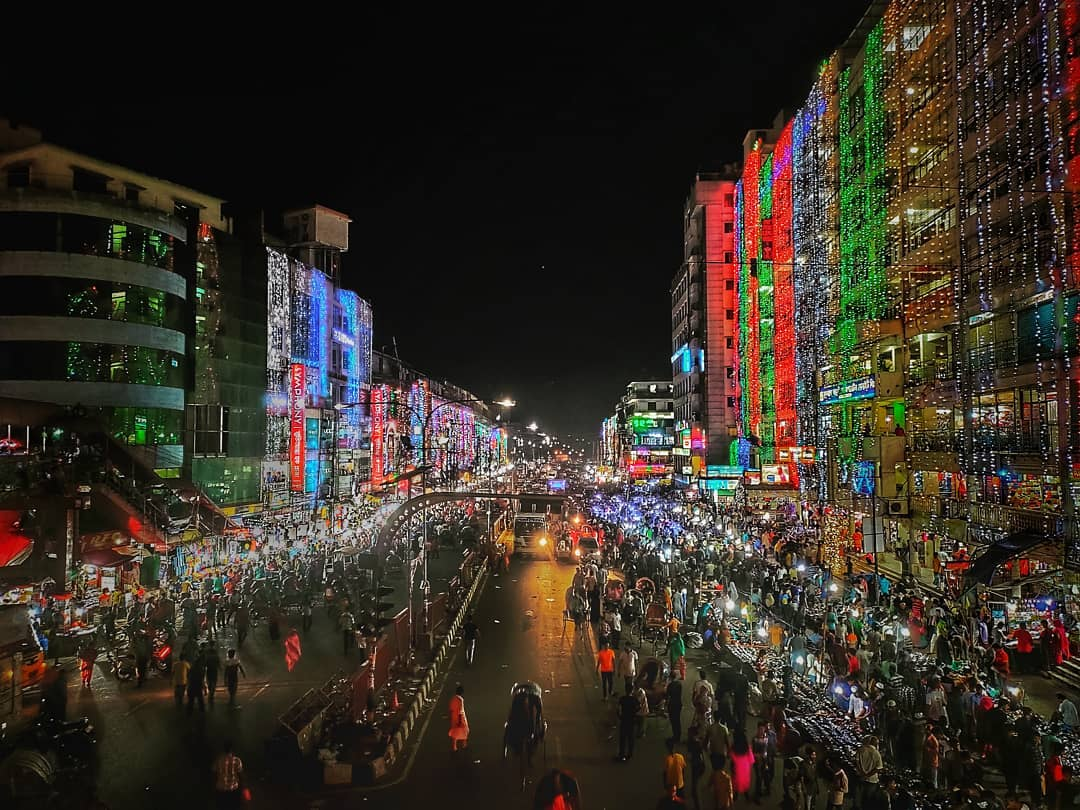
Street of Mirpur, Dhaka at night

Although New York City is the most prominently recognized city termed "The City That Never Sleeps", and the city's subway system never closes, the term has also been applied to other cities. Below is a list of cities that have also been called "the city that never sleeps":

=== Africa ===
- Cairo, Egypt
- Lagos, Nigeria

=== Asia ===
- Abu Dhabi, United Arab Emirates
- Bangkok, Thailand
- Beirut, Lebanon
- Beijing, China
- Dhaka, Bangladesh
- Dubai, United Arab Emirates
- Jakarta, Indonesia
- Karachi, Pakistan
- Kuala Lumpur, Malaysia
- Madurai, India
- Manila, Philippines
- Mumbai, India
- Shanghai, China
- Singapore
- Tel Aviv, Israel
- Tokyo, Japan

=== Europe ===
- Barcelona, Spain
- Berlin, Germany
- Belgrade, Serbia
- London, England, U.K.
- Madrid, Spain
- Moscow, Russia
- Valencia, Spain

=== North America ===
- Las Vegas, Nevada, United States
- New York City, New York, United States

=== South America ===
- Buenos Aires, Argentina
- Rio de Janeiro, Brazil
- São Paulo, Brazil

== Other 24/7 services ==
In many "24-hour" cities, plenty of eateries are open until 3 am, some clubs are open until 6 am, and bars close at 2 am or a few hours later.

Due to the COVID-19 pandemic, many 24-hour and late-night establishments began closing earlier. Coffee shops in lower Manhattan, in particular, began to close at 9:30 pm, whereas before the pandemic they had frequently closed at 12:30 am.

The people who make use of these facilities, studies have found, are nevertheless affected by sunrise and sunset. In other words: "that most humans aren't as influenced by Earth's light-dark cycle as we used to be" is not fully supported; there is an observed annual shift for "a stretch of three or four months" and "then, the process reversed direction".

== See also ==
- The City That Never Sleeps (film), a 1924 lost film
- City That Never Sleeps, a 1953 film noir set in Chicago, not New York City
- List of nicknames of New York City
