= List of cities nicknamed after fruit =

This is a list of cities who have nicknames after fruits.

Ostensibly, the first was Big Apple, from which the others have been deemed in popular culture. (American) Note for international cities, these terms are English language exonyms, and may not jibe with locals if referring to a foreign city, but often associated with backpackers, and/or expats and tourists.

== United States ==
- The Big Peach - Atlanta
- The Big Plum - Cleveland, OH
- The Big Guava - Tampa, FL
- The Big Tomato - Sacramento, CA
- The Big Apple - New York City

== International ==
- The Big Durian - Jakarta
- The Big Mango - Bangkok
- The Big Mikan - Tokyo
- The Big Orange - Tel Aviv
- The Big Coconut - Mumbai
- The Big Lychee - Hong Kong
- Red Apple - Istanbul
