= Herb Snitzer =

American photographer (1932–2023)

- Born: Herbert D. Snitzer; November 1932
- Died: December 31, 2022 (aged 90)
- Occupation: Photographer
- Website: www.herbsnitzer.com

Herb Snitzer (né Herbert D. Snitzer; November 1932 – December 31, 2022) was an American photographer who photographed jazz musicians in the 1950s and 1960s. He lived in St. Petersburg, Florida and opened his own gallery in 2014. His work has been shown in solo exhibitions at the Florida Museum of Photographic Arts, Museum of Fine Arts (St. Petersburg, Florida) and the William Breman Jewish Heritage & Holocaust Museum.

Snitzer died from complications of Parkinson's disease on December 31, 2022, at the age of 90.

== Publications ==
=== Books by Snitzer ===
- Living at Summerhill: A Photographic Documentary on A. S. Neill's Pioneering School. MacMillan, 1968. ISBN 978-0020157502.
- Today is for Children: Numbers Can Wait. MacMillan, 1972.
- Jazz: A Visual Journey. Notables, 1999.
- Glorious Days and Nights: A Jazz Memoir. University Press of Mississippi, 2011.

=== Books with others ===
- The New York I Know. By Marya Mannes. Lippincott, 1961. Photographs by Snitzer.
- Reprise, The Extraordinary Revival of Early Music. With Joel Cohen. Little Brown, 1985.

== Solo exhibitions ==
- Faces and Places: One Man Show by Herb Snitzer, Florida Museum of Photographic Arts, Tampa, Florida, 2001
- Herb Snitzer: Celebrating Fifty Years in Photography, Museum of Fine Arts (St. Petersburg, Florida), Saint Petersburg, Florida, 2007
- A Jazz Memoir: Photography by Herb Snitzer, William Breman Jewish Heritage & Holocaust Museum, Atlanta, Georgia, 2020

== Collections ==
Snitzer's work is held in the following permanent collections:

- Minneapolis Institute of Art, Minneapolis, Minnesota: 5 prints (as of 14 January 2023)
- Museum of Modern Art, New York: 1 print (as of 14 January 2023)
