= Jean Pagliuso =

- Born: 1941 (age 84–85); California
- Education: BFA from UCLA in 1963
- Known for: Photography
- Website: www.jeanpagliuso.com

Jean Pagliuso (born 1941) is an American photographer known for photographs of poultry and fashion.

== Biography ==
Pagliuso was born in California in 1941. She received her bachelor of fine arts from the University of California Los Angeles (UCLA) in 1963. Pagliuso's father raised chickens and her mother loved her flower garden. Her father's love for chickens influenced her work.

Pagliuso has lived in New York and Los Angeles throughout her career. She now lives with her husband, Tom, and her daughter, Jesse, in Santa Fe, New Mexico and New York.

== Career ==
Pagliuso worked as the assistant art director for Mademoiselle Magazine. She also worked at the office of interiors for Morganelli Heumann and Associates.

In 1969, Pagliuso started her career in photography. She moved to New York in 1974. For the next 30 years, her photographs were printed in magazines including House & Garden, Interview, Italian Harpers Bazaar, Italian Vogue, Mademoiselle, Men's Journal, Newsweek, New York Times Magazine "fashion of Times," New York Magazine, Rolling Stone, Seventeen, Time, and Vogue. She worked on assignments for fashion editor Anna Wintour for 10 years and worked with many actors and celebrities such as Shelly Duvall, Jessica Lange, Meryl Streep, Jack Nicholson, and Robert Redford among others.

Other collaborations include working with Robert Altman, Paramount Pictures, Universal Studios, Warner Brothers, 20th Century Fox, and Disney. While working with Robert Altman, she shoot stills on the sets of Thieves Likes Us, Buffalo Bill and the Indians, Nashville, and Popeye.

== Photography ==
The Poultry Suite is one of her most well-known photographic series. The Poultry Suite is a collection of photographs of chickens. She decided to take these chicken portraits in honor and memory of her father after his passing. He had raised chickens that were shown annually in the Pomona State Fair (now L.A. County Fair) when she was a little girl. Shooting with a Hasselblad camera in her Chelsea, Manhattan studio, Pagliuso photographed chickens from an animal talent agency since all of her father's chickens had been given away by the time she decided to start the project. She uses a low shutter speed and open aperture giving the images a softer quality. To achieve an effect of graphite drawings, she prints the images onto handmade Thai Mulberry paper in her darkroom. A process that is delicate and labor-intensive.

== Exhibitions ==
The Poultry Suite series of work has been shown at the Mary Ryan Gallery in New York frequently, most recently as a retrospective titled "In Plain Sight" and was turned into a monogram published by Hirmer Publishers. The series was also featured in a retrospective solo exhibition, "Poultry, Raptors, Places of Ritual" at the Florida Museum of Photographic Arts in Tampa. The Drawing Room also showed the work in a notable 2006 show of The Poultry Suite, and again in 2009 with an addition of The Raptor Suite, that included the addition of seven owl photographs.
