= Len Prince =

American photographer

Len Prince is an American photographer whose work includes celebrity portraiture, fashion, nudes, still life, a flower series and cityscapes. Since 2001–2013, his work has increasingly focussed on his collaboration with Jessie Mann which is itself about the act of collaboration, while creating memorable images that combine theatrics, and performance, and ideas. Len's focus on theatrical and entertainment photography has led to campaign work on The NYC Broadway shows ... The Graduate with Kathleen Turner, Jason Biggs, and Alicia Silverstone. And "Chicago with Gretchen Mol, Brooke Shields, Mel B, and several others. " I love photography and mostly the work with Artist's different Characters".”The Art Of Creation is far more fun and rewarding than exhibitions and ego".

== Early life ==
Len Prince was born in 1953 in Detroit Michigan. He first became interested in photography at the age of 9, and studied at the School of Visual Arts. Len also tried many different ways of photographic styles, many of which were still lives or nudes of his friends.

== Exhibitions ==
- Masks & Identity: Len Prince in the Collection of William K. Zewadski, Florida Museum of Photographic Arts, June 12 – August 2, 2008
- Jessie Mann "Self Possessed" Photographs by Len Prince, Danziger Projects, New York, Sep 9 – October 14, 2006; Adamson Gallery, Washington, DC, Jan 13 – February 24, 2007
- Prince/Paulson Glam Pop Rock, Mercury Art Works, Athens, GA, Sep 9 – November 4, 2006
