= Bud Lee (photographer) =

American photojournalist and artist (1941–2015)

- Born: Charles Todd Lee, Jr. 11 January 1941; White Plains, New York, U.S.
- Died: 11 June 2015 (aged 74); Plant City, Florida, U.S.
- Known for: Photographer for Life, Esquire, Rolling Stone, Holiday, Town & Country
- Website: www.budleepicturemaker.com

Charles Todd Lee, Jr. (January 11, 1941, White Plains, New York–June 11, 2015, Plant City, Florida), better known as Bud Lee, was a Florida based photojournalist and artist, known for his photograph of a boy wounded in the 1967 Newark riots.

== Biography ==
Bud Lee was born Charles Todd Lee, Jr., on January 11, 1941 in White Plains, New York.

After joining the U.S. Army (3rd Armored Division), Lee began working as a photographer in 1965 for the Stars & Stripes (newspaper). In 1966 the Department of Defense and the National Press Photographers Association named him U.S. Military Photographer of the Year, the Award given by the University of Missouri School of Journalism.

== Life magazine photographer ==
Lee's award led to a job as a photojournalist with Life magazine where during the summer of 1967 Lee, then 26 years old, captured images of the civil rights movement in Detroit and Newark. He shot the color image of a bleeding 12-year-old civilian, Joe Bass, who had been caught in the cross fire as a Newark Police Department officer shot and killed looter Billy Furr during the 1967 Newark riots. Bass survived the wounds and the image became the cover of Life magazine, July 28, 1967. As Managing Editor George P. Hunt wrote in his editorial, this was Lee's first major assignment;

"Rushing directly from an assignment on the stock market to the riot with only one workable lens, Bud shot the grim sequence of the death of a looter (pp. 20-21) as well as another tragic consequence of that shotgun blast–the boy on our cover."

His cover earned Lee Life magazine's 1967 photographer of the year award, and the sequence drew a first tranche of readers letters from polarized views in the 18 Aug 1967 issue of Life, and has since provoked controversy around poverty, civil rights, passive resistance and racial profiling.

== Freelance ==
Over the next seven years Lee would freelance for Esquire, Harper's Bazaar, Town & Country, Rolling Stone, the New York Times Sunday Magazine, Vogue, Mother Jones, Ms. magazine, London Records, Columbia Records, The Sunday Times magazine, the World Telegraph and numerous other publications. He taught for many years before returning to freelance photography full-time in 1990.

== Teaching and influence ==
In 1972, while working for the photography department at the University of Iowa Journalism School (where he taught Margo Rosenbaum), Lee founded the Iowa Photographers' Workshop. After a brief period in L.A. and a long illness, Lee directed his attention to teaching art and filmmaking. After receiving a National Endowment for the Arts grant, he began the Artist Filmmaker in the Schools program in Tampa, FL. During this time, Lee met his wife and started a family.

Lee became an influential and driving force in the Tampa art scene; founding the Artists and Writers Trust and the Florida Photographer's Workshop and co-founded the annual Artists and Writers Ball.

== Stroke ==
In August 2003, Lee suffered a severe stroke and his left side was paralyzed. While some recovery occurred, from September 2008 he was resident in a nursing home. Lee and his family and friends championed the causes of people in nursing homes and the issues and problems they face. He died on June 11, 2015.

== Exhibitions ==
- Soho Gallery, Cnr Prince St. and West Broadway, January ?–February 27 1972
- Bud Lee: America, Florida Museum of Photographic Arts, USA, 17 Nov 2011 – 8 Jan 2012
