= Artists and Writers Ball =

The Artists and Writers Ball was founded in the late-1970s in Tampa, FL by Bud Lee (photographer), Peggy Lee, David Audet, Paul Wilborn, Jeff Dunlap, Beverly Coe, Bebe Williams, Mary D. Scourtes and Charley Greacen as an alternative to the exclusive Gasparilla Pirate Festival krewes and parade.

== Biography ==
In the late-1970s, photographer Bud Lee moved to Tampa, FL as part of the National Endowment for the Arts Artists-in-Schools program. While working in the Artists-in-Schools program, Lee married art teacher Peggy Laseter and they moved into a storefront in Ybor City. At the time, Ybor City, a historic Cuban part of Tampa, was home to many working artist and Lee saw the opportunity to create an event that would bring all the creative energy of Ybor City and Tampa together. It would be the undergrounds alternative to the exclusive Gasparilla parties held by Tampa's social clubs.

The Artists and Writers Ball was to be an antidote or spoof of the Gasparilla parties. It was to be a themed costumed Ball that encouraged all to participate through action, spirit and costume. The first Ball, "Dante's Inferno", was held in the ballroom at the historic Cuban Club on April 15th, 1978. A local welder, Sam Parker, and entertainer, Ana Tampanna, were introduced as king and queen during a procession in which Tampanna paraded through the crowd in a peacock costume. The Artists and Writers Ball became an annual event with such themes as: "Cowboys and Indians in Love", "Bad Taste in Outer Space", "The Dizzy Dali Ball", " Calhoun's Little Hawaiian Circus for the Poor", and "The B.C. Ball". It, also, expanded from the ballroom to encompass the entire four floors and patio of the Cuban Club attracting thousands of participants.

What little money was made went into other Artists and Writers Group activities, such as, a magazine called Tabloid, the Artists and Writers Cafe and a few variety shows, "Fellini's Birthday Party" and "The USO Show."

The Artists and Writers Ball eventually ended due to rising insurance rates. In October 2006, a new incarnation of the Artists and Writers Group led by David Audet hosted its first ball, "The Reunion Ball", in 15 years.
