= Professional Women Photographers =

- Formation: 1975
- Purpose: organization dedicated to the advancement of women photographers
- Headquarters: 119 West 72nd Street #223
- Location: New York, New York
- Website: www.pwponline.org

Professional Women Photographers (PWP) is a non-profit organization based in New York City, with over 200 members. PWP was founded in 1975 by Dannielle Hayes, with photographer Dianora Niccolini as its first president. The group’s mission historically has been the encouragement and advancement of women photographers.

PWP's mission is "the advancement of women photographers through the creation of a dynamic and supportive environment while promoting public interest in photography."

PWP holds monthly meetings in Manhattan featuring a short curtain raiser by a member, then a presentation by a guest photographer. PWP also holds annual exhibitions of its members work, and various workshops for members. It has an Annual Student Awards program for city high school students.
