= Big Apple =

Nickname for New York City

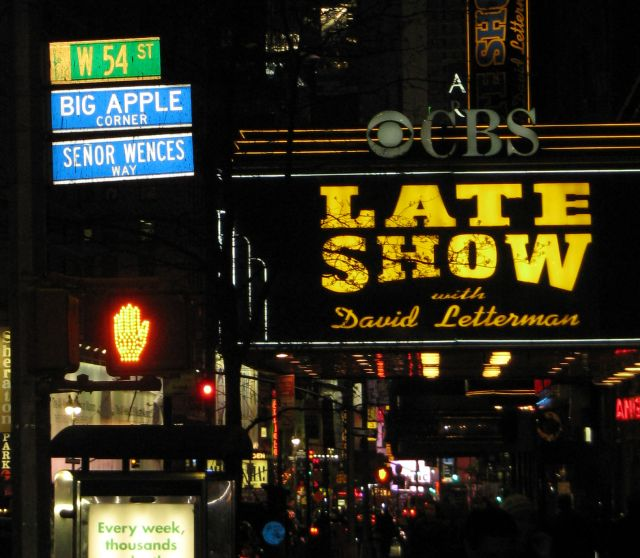
Big Apple Corner at 54th Street and Broadway, in Manhattan's Theater District

"The Big Apple" is a nickname for New York City. It was first popularized in the 1920s by John J. Fitz Gerald, a sportswriter for the New York Morning Telegraph. Its popularity since the 1970s is due in part to a promotional campaign by the New York tourist authorities.

== Origin ==
Although the history of "Big Apple" was once thought a mystery, a clearer picture of the term's history has emerged due to the work of historian Barry Popik as well as Gerald Cohen of the Missouri University of Science and Technology. A number of false theories had previously existed, including a claim that the term derived from a woman named Eve who ran a brothel in the city. This was subsequently exposed as a hoax.

The earliest known usage of "big apple" appears in the book The Wayfarer in New York (1909), in which Edward Sandford Martin writes:

Kansas is apt to see in New York a greedy city ... It inclines to think that the big apple gets a disproportionate share of the national sap.

William Safire considered this the coinage; however, Gothamist notes that because there are no quotation marks around the phrase in the text, it is likely that it was used as a metaphor, and not as a nickname for the city.

=== Horse racing origin ===
"The Big Apple" was popularized as a name for New York City by John J. Fitz Gerald in a number of horse-racing articles for the New York Morning Telegraph in the 1920s. The earliest of these was a casual reference on 3 May 1921:

J. P. Smith, with Tippity Witchet and others of the L. T. Bauer string, is scheduled to start for "the big apple" to-morrow after a most prosperous Spring campaign at Bowie and Havre de Grace.

Fitz Gerald referred to the "big apple" frequently thereafter. He explained his use in a column dated February 18, 1924, under the headline "Around the Big Apple":

The Big Apple. The dream of every lad that ever threw a leg over a thoroughbred and the goal of all horsemen. There's only one Big Apple. That's New York.

Fitz Gerald reportedly first heard "The Big Apple" used to describe New York's racetracks by two African American stable hands at the New Orleans Fair Grounds. Using racing records, Popik traced that conversation to January 1920.

In recognition of Fitz Gerald's role in promulgating "The Big Apple" as a nickname for New York City, in 1997 Mayor Rudy Giuliani signed legislation designating as "Big Apple Corner" the southwest corner of West 54th Street and Broadway, the corner on which John J. Fitz Gerald lived from 1934 to 1963. The Hotel Ameritania also once had a plaque which was installed in 1996, according to Popik, but it was removed during renovations to the building and was lost.

Evidence can also be found in the Chicago Defender, an African-American newspaper that had a national circulation. Writing for the Defender on September 16, 1922, "Ragtime" Billy Tucker used the name "big apple" to refer to New York in a non-horse-racing context:

I trust your trip to 'the big apple' (New York) was a huge success and only wish that I had been able to make it with you.

Tucker had also earlier used "big apple" as a reference to Los Angeles. It is possible that he simply used "big apple" as a nickname for any large city:

Dear Pal, Tony: No, Ragtime Billy Tucker hasn't dropped completely out of existence, but is still in the 'Big Apple', Los Angeles.

== Popularization ==
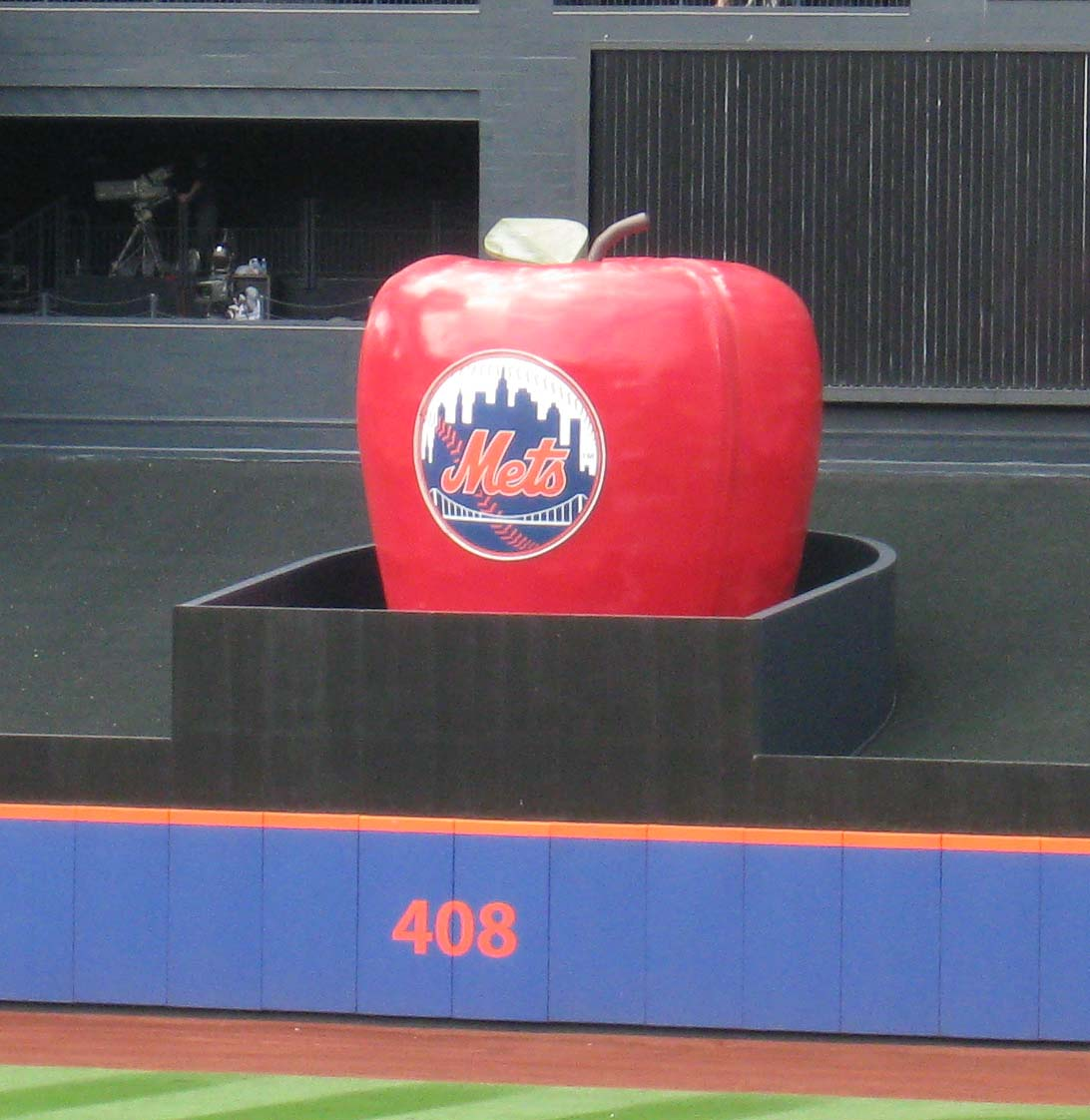
The New York Mets Home Run Apple located in Citi Field

By the late 1920s, New York writers other than Fitz Gerald were starting to use "Big Apple", and were using it in contexts other than horse racing. "The Big Apple" was a popular song and dance in the 1930s. Jazz musicians in the 1930s also contributed to the use of the phrase to refer to New York City, specifically to the city and Harlem as the jazz capital of the world. Beside the song and the dance, two nightclubs in the city used "Big Apple" in their names.

Walter Winchell and other writers continued to use the term in the 1940s and early 1950s, but by the late 1950s, if it was known at all, it had come to be considered an outdated nickname for New York.

In the early 1970s, however, during the city's fiscal crisis, "People were looking around desperately and some of them seized that old phrase the Big Apple to remind people of when New York had been a strong and powerful city and might become that again," according to the official Manhattan Borough Historian, Dr. Robert Snyder. It was then that the New York Convention and Visitors Bureau – now "NYC Tourism + Conventions", New York City's official marketing and tourism organization – with the help of the Ogilvy & Mather advertising firm, began to promote the city's "Big Apple" nickname to tourists, under the leadership of its president, Charles Gillett. The campaign was a success, and the nickname has remained popular since then.

Today, the name is used exclusively to refer to New York City, and is used with regularity by journalists and news headline writers across the English-speaking world.

The name is also referenced in cultural products and events related to New York, including the Home Run Apple, the Big Apple Anime Fest, the Big Apple Circus, the Big Apple Theater Festival, Jess Teong's The Kid from the Big Apple, Kajagoogoo's Big Apple, and Patrick Downey's Bad Seeds in the Big Apple, a 2008 historical study of New York City's criminal underworld.

== See also ==
- List of cities nicknamed after fruit
