= John J. Fitz Gerald =

American horse racing journalist (1893–1963)

John Joseph Fitz Gerald
- Born: March 7, 1893
- Died: March 17, 1963 (aged 70)
- Occupation: Turf racing writer
- Years active: 1912–1940
- Employer: New York Morning Telegraph
- Known for: Popularizing "Big Apple" as a nickname for New York City

John Joseph Fitz Gerald (March 7, 1893 – March 17, 1963) was a turf racing writer for the New York Morning Telegraph, from 1912 to 1940 (except for his service in World War I), serving as turf editor for the last 15 years. He was later the public relations director at various times for Garden State Racetrack and Atlantic City Race Course in New Jersey as well as the Tropical Park Race Track in Miami, Florida.

Fitz Gerald was the sports editor of the Daily Sports Bulletin, a sports daily, in his later years. His last name was sometimes spelled FitzGerald by others, but Fitz Gerald was the spelling used in his Morning Telegraph column. He is best known today for popularizing "Big Apple" as a nickname for New York City.
