= 11 West 54th Street =

Building in Manhattan, New York

- James J. Goodwin Residence
- U.S. Historic district – Contributing property
- New York City Landmark
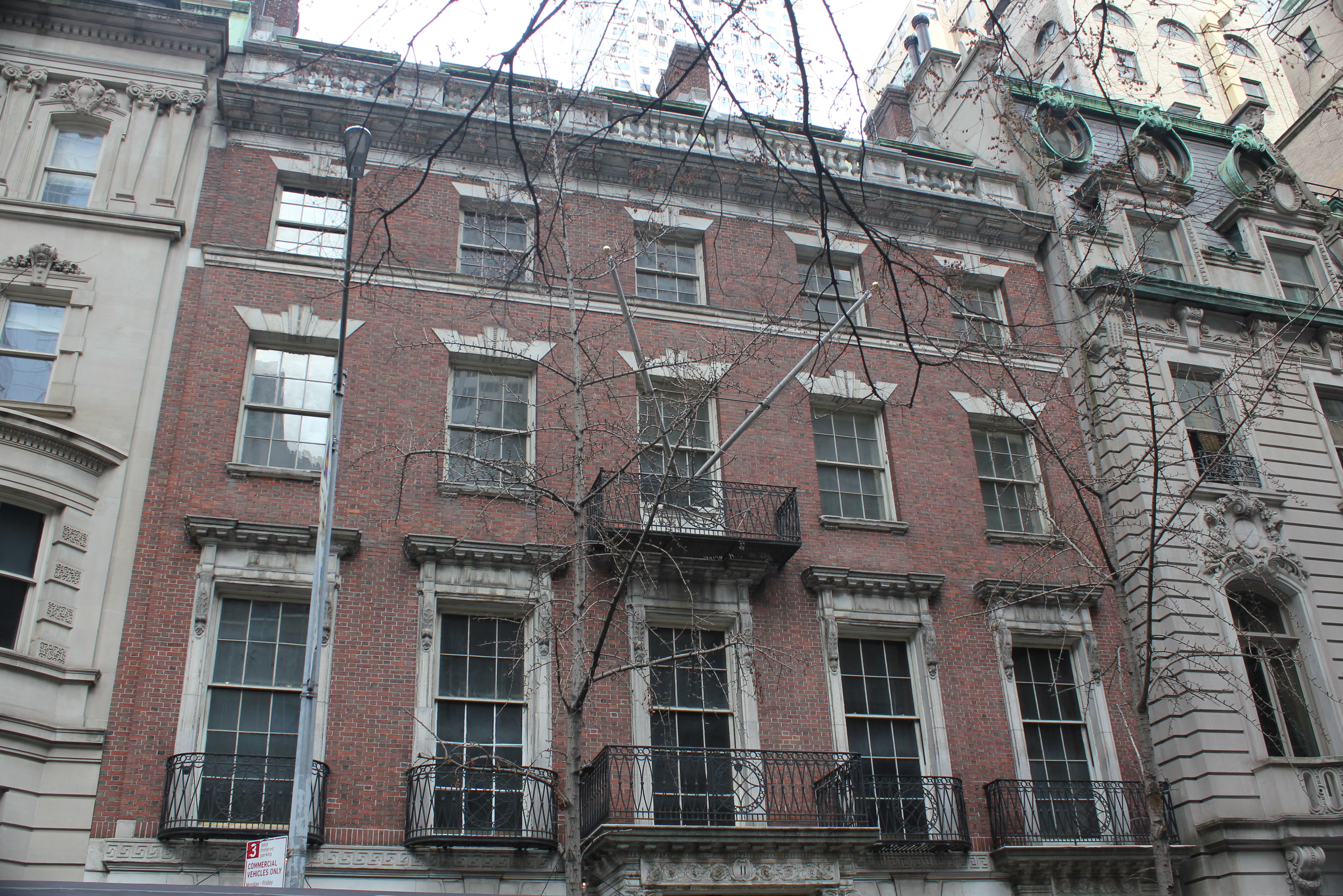
- The house as seen in March 2021
- Location: 11 West 54th Street, Manhattan, New York, US
- Coordinates: 40°45′42″N 73°58′34″W
- Architect: McKim, Mead & White
- Architectural style: Georgian Revival
- Part of: Residences at 5-15 West 54th Street (ID89002260)
- NYCL No.: 1103

Significant dates
- Designated CP: January 4, 1990
- Designated NYCL: February 3, 1981

11 West 54th Street (also 9 West 54th Street and the James J. Goodwin Residence) is a commercial building in the Midtown Manhattan neighborhood of New York City, United States. It is along 54th Street's northern sidewalk between Fifth Avenue and Sixth Avenue. The four-and-a-half-story building was designed by McKim, Mead & White in the Georgian Revival style and was constructed between 1896 and 1898 as a private residence. It is one of five consecutive townhouses erected along the same city block during the 1890s, the others being 5, 7, 13 and 15 West 54th Street.

The building is designed as a double house, with a larger unit at 11 West 54th Street to the west, as well as a smaller unit at 9 West 54th Street to the east. The facade is made of rusticated blocks of limestone on the first story, as well as Flemish bond brick on the upper stories. Businessman James Junius Goodwin—a cousin and business partner of J. P. Morgan—and his wife Josephine lived at the main unit at number 11 with his family and rented number 9.

The house initially served as the second residence for James Goodwin, who lived primarily in Connecticut. James Goodwin died in 1915, and Josephine continued to live in the house until 1939, after which it was used briefly by the Inter-America House and the Museum of Modern Art The house was sold to Parsonage Point Realty Company in 1944 and leased to the Rhodes Preparatory School, which bought the building in 1949. The house was then sold in 1979 to the United States Trust Company, which renovated the structure. The New York City Landmarks Preservation Commission designated the house as an official landmark in 1981, and it was added to the National Register of Historic Places in 1990 as part of the 5–15 West 54th Street Residences historic district.

== Site ==
11 West 54th Street is in the Midtown Manhattan neighborhood of New York City, United States. It is along the northern sidewalk of 54th Street between Fifth Avenue and Sixth Avenue, with an alternate address of 9 West 54th Street. The land lot is rectangular and covers 5,000 square feet (460 m^{2}), with a frontage of 50 feet (15 m) on 54th Street and a depth of 100.42 feet (30.61 m). The building is the center of five consecutive townhouses erected along the same city block, with 5 West 54th Street and 7 West 54th Street to its east, as well as 13 and 15 West 54th Street to its west. The five townhouses are adjoined by the Rockefeller Apartments to the west, The Peninsula New York and the St. Regis New York hotels to the northeast, the University Club of New York and 689 Fifth Avenue to the east, the William H. Moore House and Saint Thomas Church to the southeast, and the Museum of Modern Art to the south.

Fifth Avenue between 42nd Street and Central Park South (59th Street) was relatively undeveloped through the late 19th century. The surrounding area was once part of the common lands of the city of New York. The Commissioners' Plan of 1811 established Manhattan's street grid with lots measuring 100 feet (30 m) deep and 25 feet (7.6 m) wide. Upscale residences were constructed around Fifth Avenue following the American Civil War. The two-block stretch of West and East 54th Street from Madison Avenue to Sixth Avenue, bisected by Fifth Avenue, was developed with the houses of prominent figures such as William Henry Moore, John R. Platt, and John D. Rockefeller Sr. The sites of the five houses at 5–15 West 54th Street, along with the University Club, were formerly occupied by St. Luke's Hospital, which moved out during 1896.

== Architecture ==
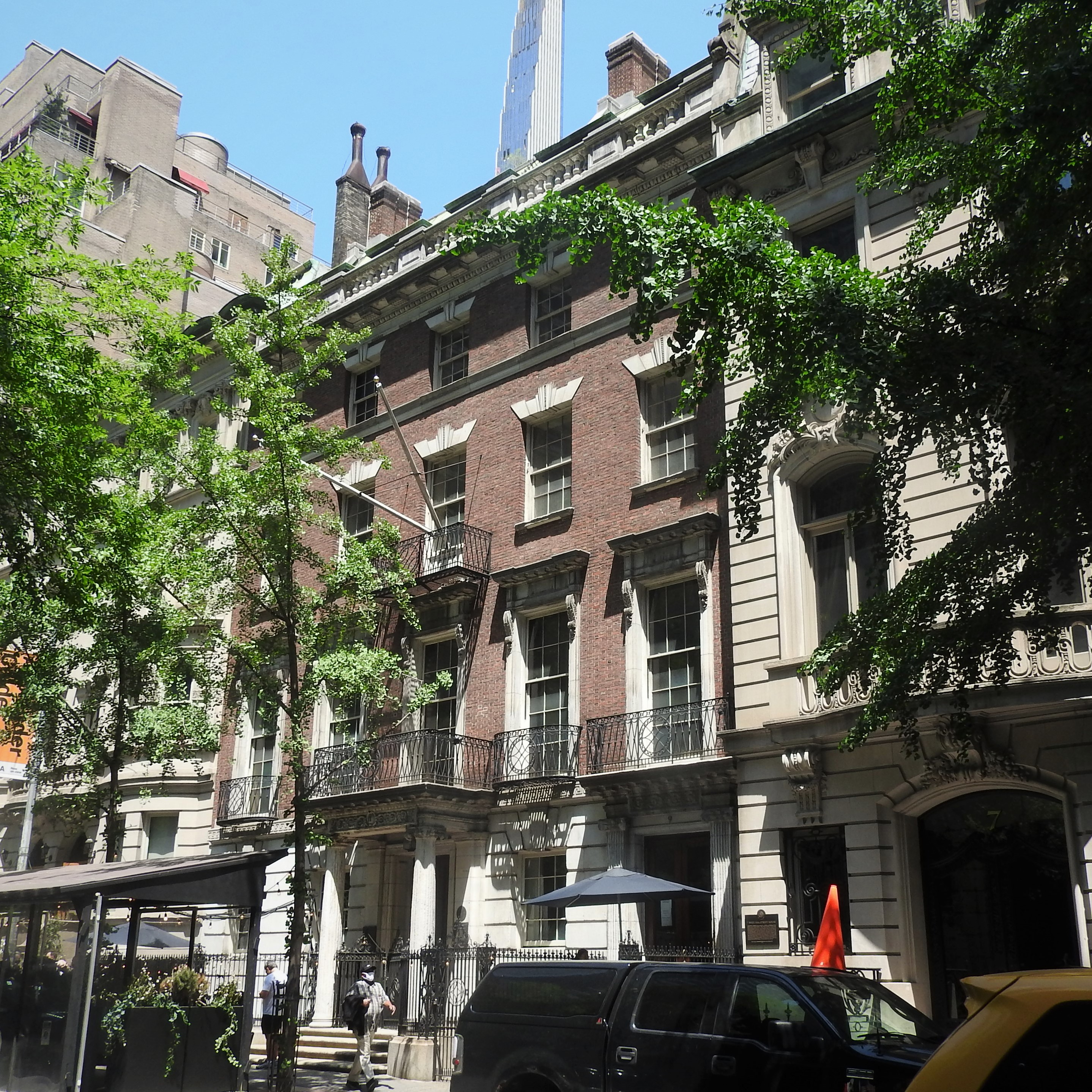
Seen in May 2021; 13 West 54th Street is at left and 7 West 54th Street is at right

The houses at 5–15 West 54th Street, all developed in the late 1890s for wealthy clients, were designed as a cohesive grouping, unlike other residences in the neighborhood. According to The New York Times, the houses form the sole remaining "real strip of mansions" in Midtown Manhattan. The houses at 5, 7, 9–11, and 13 and 15 West 54th Street all had different architects. The double unit at 9 and 11 West 54th Street was designed by McKim, Mead & White in the Georgian Revival style. 11 West 54th Street was partly modeled on the Third Harrison Gray Otis House in Boston. The house is an early example of a brick Colonial Revival house in New York City with three-dimensional decorations. The ornamental steelwork was manufactured by the Prince & Kinkel Iron Works. Russell Sturgis, writing for Architectural Record in 1900, described the house as two structures with their "facades forced into one". Sturgis considered the facade of number 9 as being "subordinate" to number 11, even though the details of both units otherwise harmonized with each other.

=== Facade ===
The building is four and a half stories tall and five bays wide. The basement and first floor are clad with rusticated blocks of limestone, while the three upper floors are clad with brick. The building was designed with number 11 as the main residence, taking up the westernmost three bays, and number 9 as a secondary residence, taking up the easternmost two bays. Nevertheless, the entire facade was designed to be largely symmetrical. Along the street facade, the house is set behind an iron railing and a depressed areaway.

From the ground level, a low stoop with four steps leads to the entrance to number 11, at the center of the facade. In front of the main entrance is a portico supported by two fluted columns designed in the Ionic style. The columns are topped by Scamozzi-style capitals, which support a carved panel with a cartouche at its center. A cornice with modillions runs above the portico. Under the portico is a pair of wood-and-glass doors inside a stone doorway frame topped by a keystone. The rightmost bay also has an entrance, which leads to number 9 and is simpler in design than the main entrance. The rightmost entrance lacks a portico and has fluted pilasters rather than a simple doorway frame, but it contains similar modillioned cornice and double wood-and-glass doors to the main entrance. The other three ground-story bays consist of recessed six-over-six windows with stone voussoirs and paneled keystones. Above the first floor is a band course with fret designs.

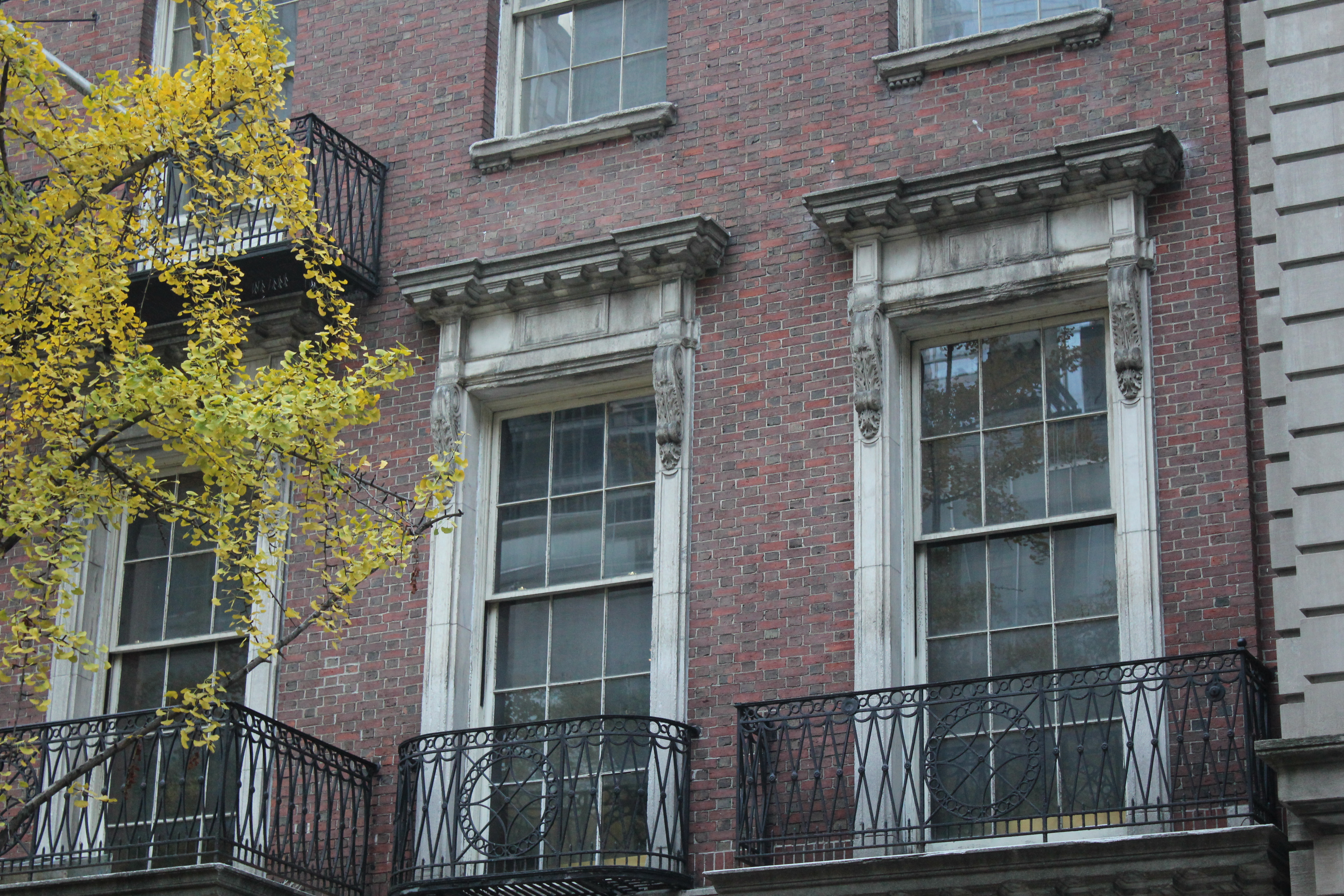
Close-up of second story balconies

The second story has five windows with six-over-nine panes. Above each second-story window is a lintel and modillioned stone cornice supported by foliated brackets. In front of each second-story window is a balcony with an iron railing. The center window (corresponding to the portico) and the rightmost window (corresponding to the secondary entrance) have larger balconies than the three other bays. These balconies are designed as oblong rhombuses with rosettes in their centers. The third and fourth floors each have five windows with six-over-six panes, above which are splayed stone lintels. On the third floor, the center window has a balcony similar to those on the second floor, while the other windows have simple limestone sills. Below the fourth floor is a stone string course that doubles as the sill for the fourth-story windows. Above the fourth floor is a modillioned cornice, above which is a stone balustrade. The attic has a slate mansard roof with five dormer windows that contain hip roofs. The mansard roof also has three brick chimneys.

=== Interior ===
The building contains about 22,500 square feet (2,090 m^{2}) (Note: Also cited as 24,000 square feet (2,200 m^{2})) spread across two units. According to a real estate listing, the house had 11 master bedrooms, 11 staff bedrooms, 12 fireplaces, skylighted staircases, and a wood-paneled entrance foyer. The stairs had carved acorns, the entrance and stair landings had decorative pillars, and the ceiling had plaster moldings. When the house was built, number 9 was designed in what was then considered a Federal Revival or Classical Revival design. Number 9 had a variety of furniture, ranging from 19th century designs to contemporary Herter Brothers furniture, as well as an Oriental rug and potted plants. Two staircases, both topped by skylights made of stained glass, ascend throughout the building. There is also a dumbwaiter and elevator.

Originally, the first floor of number 9 had the reception hall in the front and a dining room in the rear. The first floor of number 11 had a vestibule and a study in the front, a stair hall in the center, and a kitchen and servants' dining room in the rear. The second floor of number 9 had a living room in the front and a library in the rear, while the second floor of number 11 had a living room in the front, a hall and reception room in the center, and an octagonal dining room in the rear. Number 11 had a walk-in safe for silver next to the dining room, with a wood-paneled closet door concealing the steel entrance into the safe. Number 11's second floor had a high ceiling and a fireplace, as well as large mirrors and fireplace mantels. In both units, the second floor's large windows were designed to face MoMA's rear garden. In both residential units, the third floor contained numerous bedrooms.

Both units were internally connected on the second floor in 1943. After an early 1980s renovation, the reception hall was clad in wood paneling while the second floor dining room was restored. The United States Trust Company, the occupant at the time of the 1980s renovation, reproduced many of the original decorations and added a rear annex. After the US Trust renovation, the house's interior had marble fireplace mantels, gilded bronze lights, and walls with red paper or green silk damask. At the rear of the house, a tellers' station was installed in a former servants' area. A 17-foot-deep (5.2 m) bank vault with a security booth and bulletproof windows was constructed. By the 21st century, the interiors were decorated in the neo-Georgian style.

== History ==
=== Residence ===
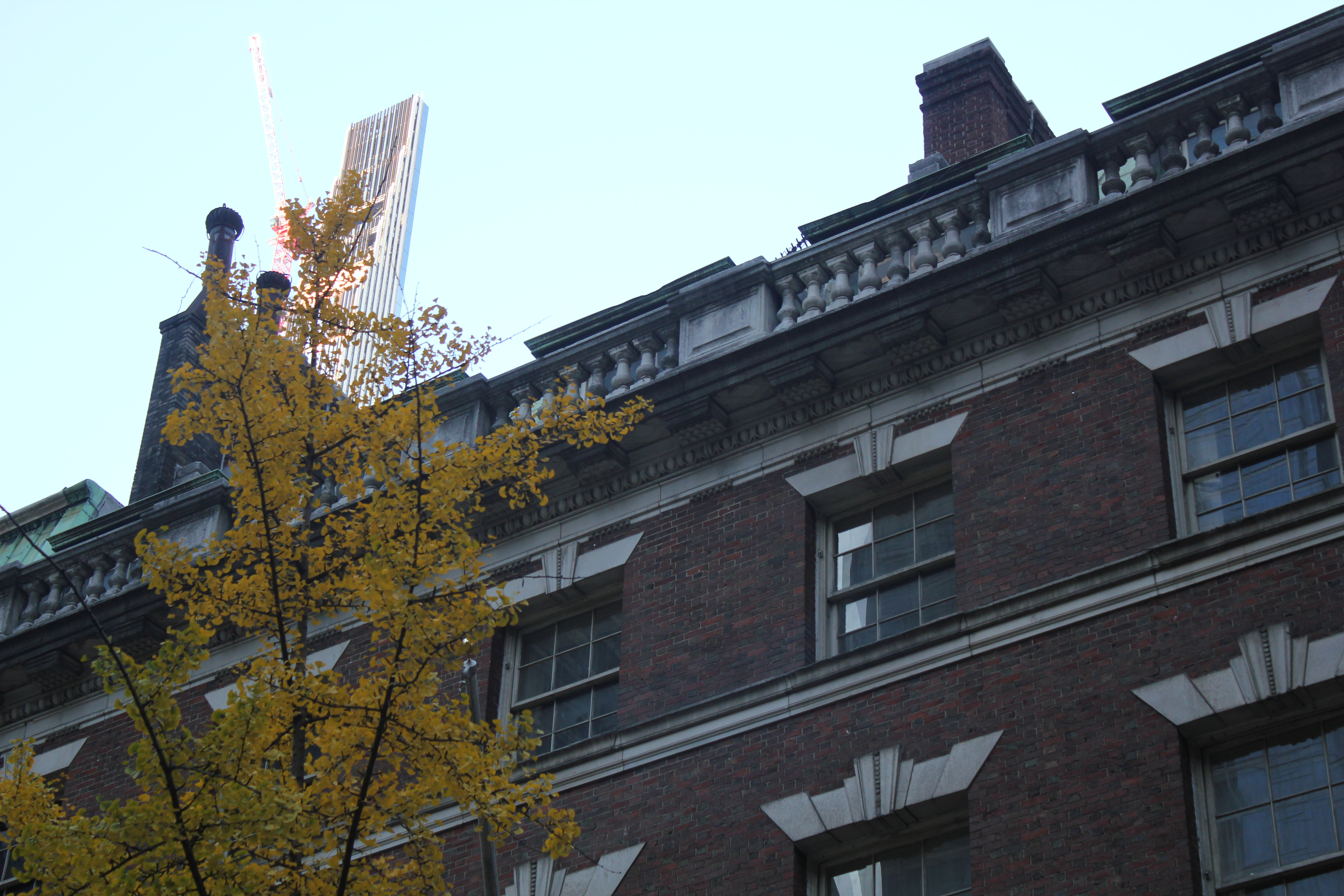
Detail of top of the house with 111 West 57th Street in the background

In 1896, with the relocation of St. Luke's Hospital from Midtown to Morningside Heights, Manhattan, the hospital's former site on the northern side of 54th Street west of Fifth Avenue became available for development. The University Club, whose construction commenced the same year, was the first structure to be built on the former hospital plot. In February 1896, Josephine Goodwin, wife of James Junius Goodwin, acquired a plot on 54th Street about 225 feet (69 m) west of Fifth Avenue. James J. Goodwin was a prominent Connecticut businessman and railroad director who had a business partnership with his cousin, financier J. P. Morgan. McKim, Mead & White was commissioned to design a house on the site. The architects filed plans for the house with the New York City Department of Buildings in July 1896, with the house projected to cost $90,000, although the building was classified in blueprints as being a pair of residences. The Goodwin house was the first of the five structures at 5–15 West 54th Street to be developed.

The house was completed in 1898. Initially, James and Josephine Goodwin occupied the main unit at number 11 and leased out the secondary unit at number 9. The Goodwins maintained a house in Hartford, Connecticut, where James spent most of his time. James was also a member of several clubs in New York, including the Union Club, Century Association, and Metropolitan Club. James died in 1915 and left all of his estate to Josephine and their three sons. After James's death, Josephine continued to live at 11 West 54th Street. The surrounding neighborhood rapidly became a commercial zone after World War I, and many neighboring townhouses were converted to commercial use, but the Goodwin family retained the house. Their son Walter lived at the house briefly from 1921 to 1922. The Goodwin residence was used for events as well. In 1924, the dean of Lincoln Cathedral in England hosted a lecture to raise money to repair the damaged church, and in 1932, the house hosted a lecture on the importance of Christian missionary work in Japan.

Number 9 was leased to a variety of residents. One of the families that occupied the house was Mr. and Mrs. Elijah P. Smith. By 1915, it was the home of William S. Bryant, who oversaw the execution of Charles Becker, a policeman found guilty of murdering gambler Herman Rosenthal. In 1921, Josephine Goodwin leased the house to Francis de Ruyter Wissman and his wife. Bulletins of New York City social life indicated that the Wissmans were active in social life and that they were still residents of 9 West 54th Street in 1930. Josephine Goodwin died in 1939 and left most of the estate to her three sons. The windows had been boarded up by 1940.

=== Later use ===
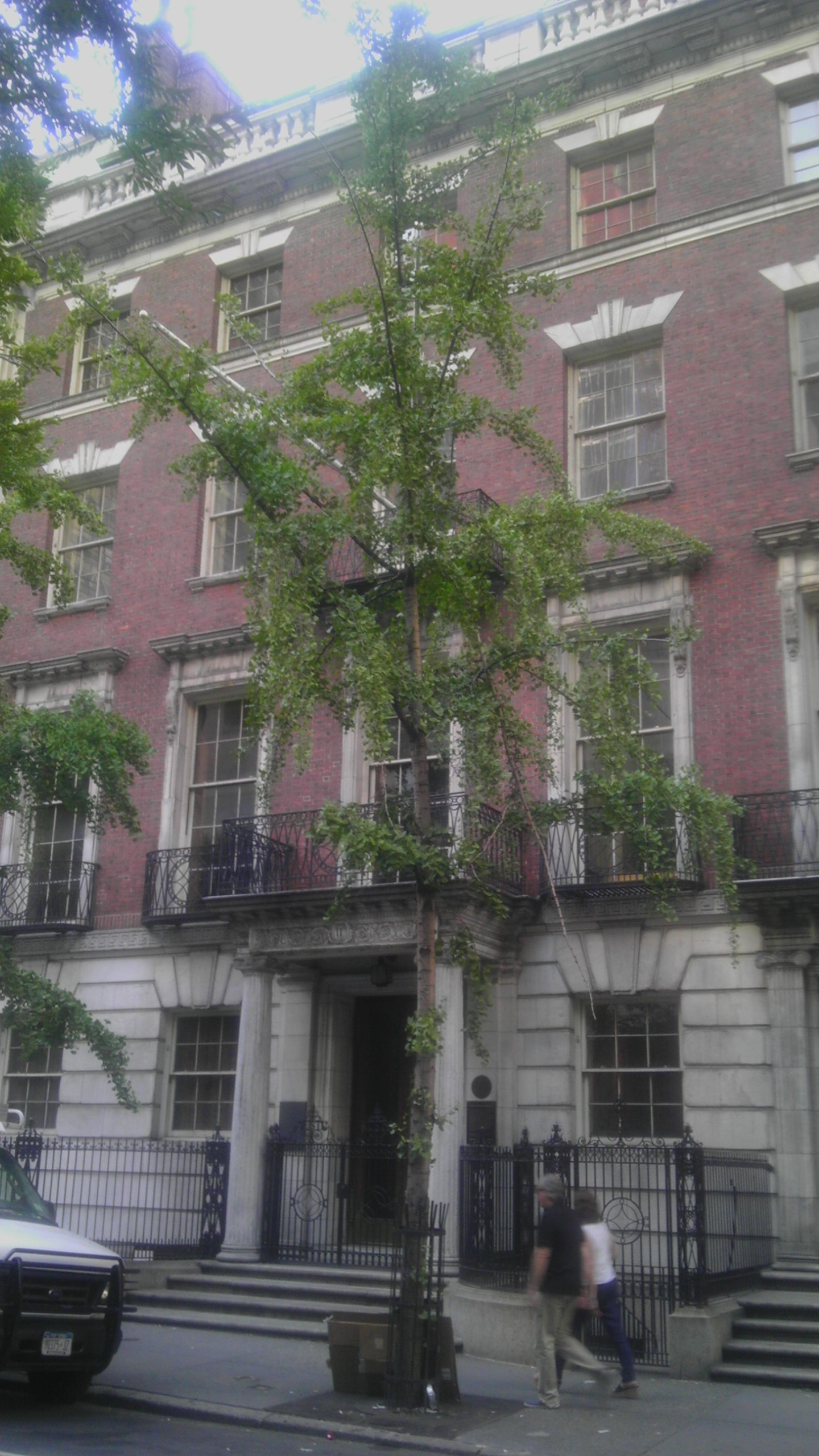
Viewed in August 2013

The house was acquired in 1941 by the Inter-America House, a Latin American cultural organization. The organization used the house for events such as a reception for the Mexican consul general, an event honoring Latin American Red Cross workers, and an event honoring Latin American women on a goodwill tour of the United States. In November 1943, MoMA opened a photography annex on the first floor of number 9 and the second floor of both units. A hole was cut in the second-floor wall to connect the units. At the time, Philip Goodwin was still recorded as the owner. The next year, the Parsonage Point Realty Company bought the house. The Rhodes Preparatory School leased both units for ten years in November 1944 and moved into the house. The school outright purchased the building in 1949. Many of the original decorative details were removed by the school.

The Rhodes School sold the house in 1979 to the United States Trust Company, a bank, for use as its own headquarters. The bank had considered moving its headquarters into several other structures, including buildings on wide avenues as well as new structures, before deciding upon the Goodwin mansion for its architecture. The bank hired Haines Lundberg Waehler to restore 9–11 West 54th Street largely to its original design. US Trust spent $5 million to ensure as much of the original detail as possible would be preserved or adapted to the bank's use. Materials were refurbished or replaced largely to the original specifications, and the bank invited James Goodwin's grandson Sage Goodwin to ask him about his childhood recollections of the house's design. Bank consultant David G. De Long said that original drawings were also used to restore the space. The architects even used scraps of original wallpaper to recreate the original wall designs and textures. A small annex in the rear was built for bank tellers.

The New York City Landmarks Preservation Commission designated the five houses at 5–15 West 54th Street as city landmarks, including the Goodwin residence, on February 3, 1981. The Committee for the Preservation of West 54th and West 55th Streets had pushed for the landmark designation. At the time, the five houses were in various states of preservation: although 9–11 West 54th Street was being restored, the twin houses at 13 and 15 West 54th Street had been proposed for demolition. The New York Landmarks Conservancy granted the US Trust Company its 1981 Chairman's Award for preserving the house in the renovation. On January 4, 1990, the building was added to the National Register of Historic Places as part of the Residences at 5–15 West 54th Street historic district. US Trust expanded its space into 13 and 15 West 54th Street, demolishing a wall separating the two pairs of residences, in the late 20th century.

During the 2000s, US Trust became part of Charles Schwab and subsequently Bank of America. In 2009, Bank of America sold the building for $29.4 million. The buyers, DLJ Real Estate Capital Partners and J.D. Carlisle, left it vacant, as they wanted to assemble other land lots nearby. The owners placed the property for sale in 2015. 11 West 54th Street and an adjacent office building at 10 West 55th Street was sold for $75 million in 2019 to the Wilf family, whose offices were at the adjacent 13 and 15 West 54th Street. Family member Orin Wilf, who led Skyline Partners, said at the time that he was unsure what he planned to do with the building. The Wilf family obtained a $91 million mortgage on the houses soon afterward. In June 2025, the Wilf family sold the house to Interlaken Capital for $38 million.

== See also ==
- List of New York City Designated Landmarks in Manhattan from 14th to 59th Streets
- National Register of Historic Places listings in Manhattan from 14th to 59th Streets
