= Rockefeller Apartments =

Residential building in Manhattan, New York

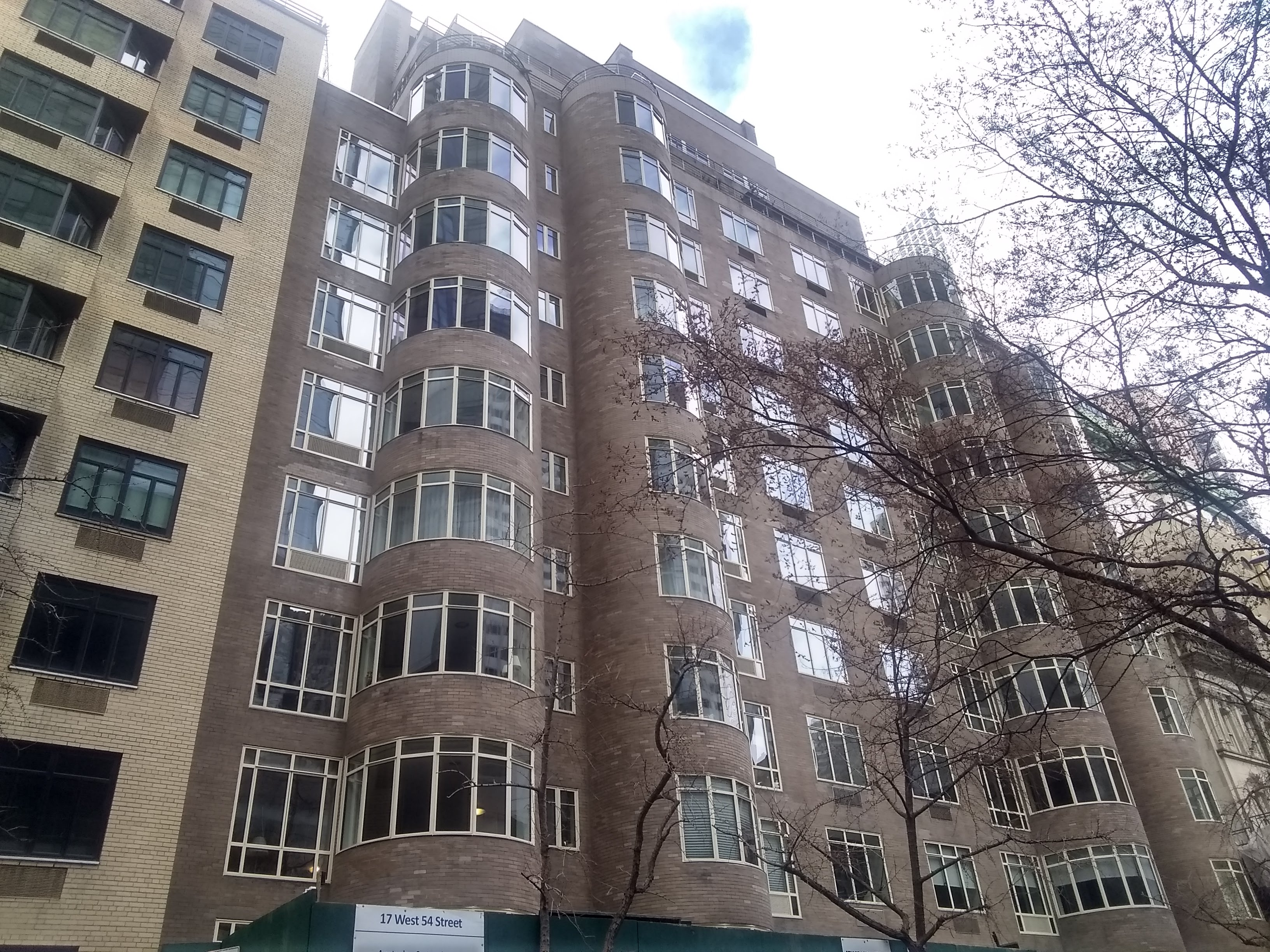
- Seen in 2021
- Interactive map of the Rockefeller Apartments area

General information
- Type: Residential cooperative
- Architectural style: International Style
- Location: Manhattan, New York, US, 17 West 54th Street; 24 West 55th Street
- Coordinates: 40°45′43″N 73°58′36″W
- Construction started: March 1936
- Completed: October 1, 1936

Technical details
- Material: Tawny brick, glass (facade)
- Floor count: 11
- Lifts/elevators: 4
- Grounds: 25,000 square feet (2,300 m^{2})

Design and construction
- Architects: Wallace Harrison and J. André Fouilhoux
- Main contractor: Barr, Irons & Lane Inc

New York City Landmark
- Designated: June 19, 1984
- Reference no.: 1276

The Rockefeller Apartments is a residential building at 17 West 54th Street and 24 West 55th Street in the Midtown Manhattan neighborhood of New York City, United States. Designed by Wallace Harrison and J. André Fouilhoux in the International Style, the Rockefeller Apartments was constructed between 1935 and 1936. The complex was originally designed with 138 apartments.

The apartment complex, just north of the Museum of Modern Art, was built on land left over from the construction of Rockefeller Center. The Rockefeller Apartments consists of two towers, one facing north toward 55th Street and one facing south toward 54th Street. The land under the Rockefeller Apartments had been owned by the Rockefeller family, and the architects had been involved in designing Rockefeller Center. The two towers are 11 stories and are faced with brick, with partially protruding cylindrical bays. The interior was intended to allow fifteen percent more air and natural light compared to contemporary building regulations. The ground floor contains a location of Michael's Restaurant.

The Rockefeller family had secretly acquired the site by the 1930s, although this was not disclosed until the plans for the apartment complex were announced in November 1935. The family had intended to remodel existing houses on the site, though they instead decided to build an apartment complex to complement Rockefeller Center, connected via an ultimately unbuilt extension of Rockefeller Plaza. The complex was fully leased by the time residents moved to the apartments in October 1936. The building was sold to the Astor family in 1945 and Henry Goelet in 1953, and it became a cooperative apartment complex in 1954. The New York City Landmarks Preservation Commission designated the complex as a city landmark in 1984.

== Site ==
The Rockefeller Apartments are in the Midtown Manhattan neighborhood of New York City. The complex has an address of 17 West 54th Street to the south and 24 West 55th Street to the north, midblock between Fifth Avenue and Sixth Avenue. The land lot is rectangular and covers around 25,000 square feet (2,300 m^{2}), with a frontage of 125 feet (38 m) on either street and a depth of about 200 feet (61 m). To the east, the Rockefeller Apartments abut the residences at 15, 13, 11, 7, and 5 West 54th Street, as well as the University Club of New York and The Peninsula New York hotel. Other nearby locations include the houses at 10, 12, 26, and 30 West 56th Street to the north; 712 Fifth Avenue and the Fifth Avenue Presbyterian Church to the northeast; 46 West 55th Street to the west; 53W53 to the southwest; the Museum of Modern Art (MoMA) to the south; and Saint Thomas Church to the southeast.

Prior to the development of Rockefeller Apartments, the site was occupied by low-density residences. The nearby section of Fifth Avenue between 42nd Street and Central Park South (59th Street) was relatively undeveloped through the late 19th century. The surrounding area was once part of the common lands of the city of New York. The lots along Fifth Avenue were laid out in the late 18th century following the American Revolutionary War. Upscale residences were constructed around Fifth Avenue following the American Civil War. The two-block stretch of West and East 54th Street from Madison Avenue to Sixth Avenue, bisected by Fifth Avenue, was developed with the houses of prominent figures such as William Henry Moore, John R. Platt, and John D. Rockefeller Sr. The neighboring houses at 5–15 West 54th Street were developed between 1896 and 1900 as part of this row of upscale houses. John D. Rockefeller Jr., nicknamed "Junior", once occupied house number 13 before moving across the street to a now-demolished house at number 10.

== Architecture ==
The two towers comprising the Rockefeller Apartments were commissioned by Junior and his son, Nelson Rockefeller. They were designed in the International Style by Wallace Harrison and J. André Fouilhoux. The architects sought to design the apartment complex as an up-to-date model community. The general contractor was Barr, Irons & Lane Inc. Various contractors were hired for the windows, materials, elevators, floor and wall coverings, furnishings, hardware, electrical installation, plumbing, and heating and air conditioning.

=== Form and facade ===
The complex's northern and southern towers are similar to one another. Both structures are eleven stories tall and symmetrically arranged with protruding glass-enclosed cylindrical "bows". The protruding bows measure 8 feet (2.4 m) deep by up to 14 feet (4.3 m) wide and extend to the sidewalk boundary on both ends. Both towers are separated from each other by a ground-floor garden. The lower nine floors of each tower occupy the same area as each other, but the tenth floor is set back on the west and east, and the eleventh floor is set back on all sides. According to the New York City Landmarks Preservation Commission (LPC), the Rockefeller Apartments' twin-tower layout may have been inspired from the work of German architect Otto Haesler, but the apartments' setback penthouses differed from Haesler's flat roofs.

Both facades are made of tawny-colored brick laid within tawny mortar. The bricks used in the facade are 12 inches (300 mm) thick and were made by the Hanley Company. The facades contain steel casement windows, which are placed flush with the facade. The windows inside the bows are curved. There are no major decorative elements other than these cylindrical bows. The curved bows were glazed for two-thirds of their circumference and may have been inspired by Haesler's design for the Georgsgarten Settlement. The window frames were made by the Detroit Steel Products Company and the glass was made by the Pittsburgh Plate Glass Company.

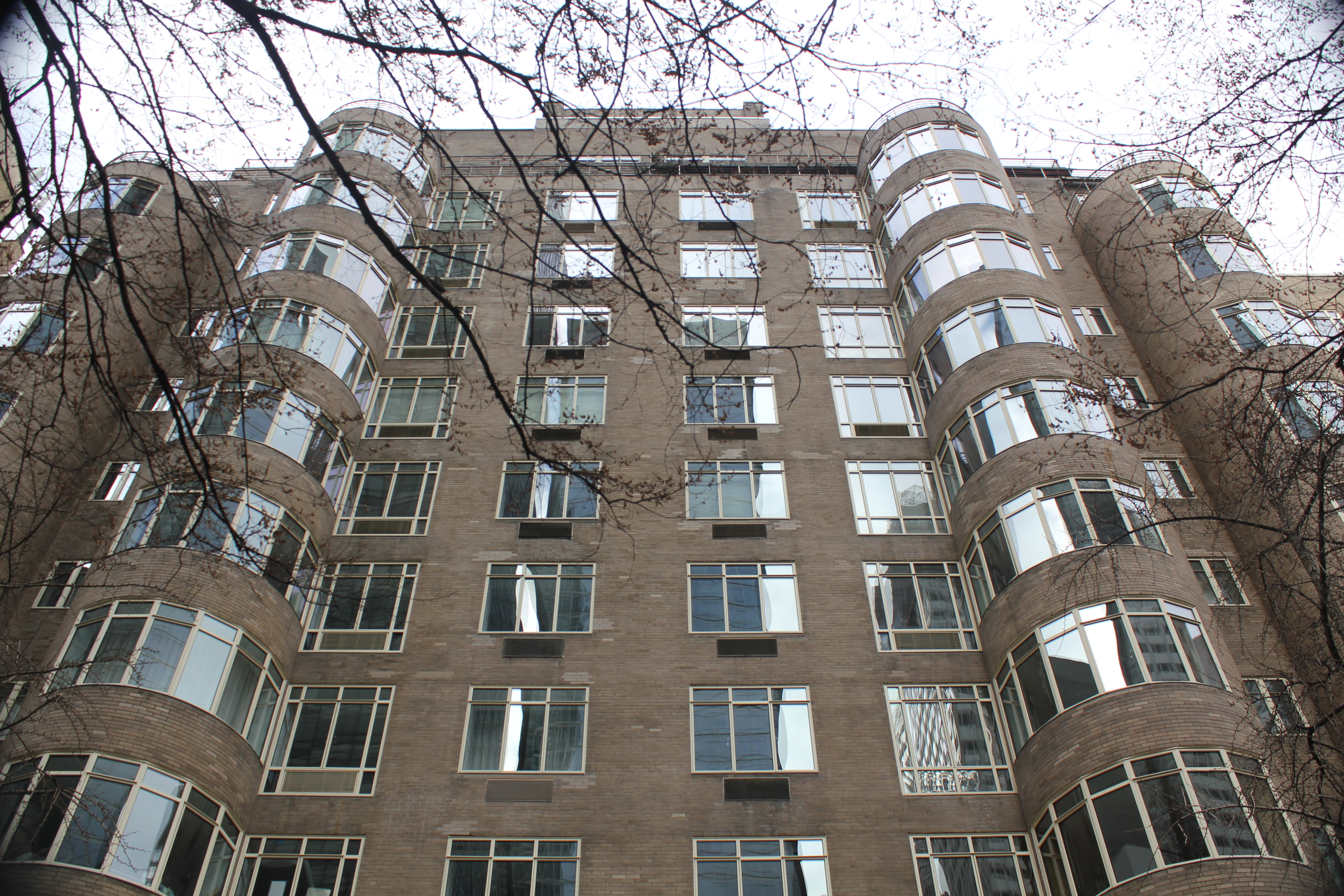
The bowed bays on 54th Street

On the southern tower facing 54th Street, the entrance is through two doors and contains a metal canopy that cantilevers from above the center of the first story. The address "17 West 54th Street" is printed on the sides of the canopy. Behind the flashing on each of the canopy's three sides are flanges, which contain sliding hooks that formerly supported canvas curtains. On either side of the 54th Street entrance are planters and offices. The 54th Street facade contains four cylindrical bows, two at either end. The outermost bows on either side rise to the 10th story, while the inner bows rise the entire 11-story height of the building. On each story, between the 10- and 11-story bows on either side, there is one pair of small casement windows. There are six large windows on the rest of the facade: one at the end of the facade on each story, outside the outermost bows, as well as four between the two innermost bows. These large openings each consist of three casement windows with their own transom windows above, as well as a single ventilation opening below the transom.

On the north tower facing 55th Street, the entrance contains a similar metal canopy and two doorways. There are storefronts on either side of the secondary entrance. On the rest of the facade, there are two cylindrical bows, one on either end, which rise only to the ninth story. There are large window openings on the extreme ends of the facade, outside each bow, as well as pairs of small casement windows on the opposite side of the bow, similar to the south tower's 54th Street facade. However, instead of having two additional bows, the entire center section of the 55th Street facade is projected from the rest of the facade. This projecting section contains four large window openings in the center, similar to those on 54th Street, which in turn are flanked by curved windows. The projecting section rises the full 11-story height of the facade.

=== Features ===
The architects arranged the apartments so they were all illuminated well, even though the layout resulted in fewer units than in comparable buildings. As a result, the apartment towers do not occupy the full area of their lot. The plan allowed 15 percent more air and natural light than other apartments of the time.

==== Structural features ====
The Rockefeller Apartments' internal structure contains a layer of 3-inch-thick (76 mm) freestanding gypsum, separated from the brick facade by a small air gap. The concrete partitions separating the different units were made by the Aerocrete Company. The cinder-concrete and terracotta partitions, demarcating bathrooms and shafts within the individual units, were made by the National Tile Company, while the 3-inch-thick gypsum and metal lath walls inside the individual apartments were manufactured by the Consolidated Expanded Metal Company. Post & McCord made the steel skeletal frame.

The roofs of either tower were to be used as playgrounds and sunroofs. Also included in the plans were a communal playroom and squash court. One-third of the plot was to be reserved for a public walkway, covered by glass during winters and left open during summers. A private community garden separates the two towers. The garden covers about 7,600 square feet (710 m^{2}). The garden varies between 43 and 78 feet (13 and 24 m) wide between the buildings, and it is 125 feet long, the same as the lot width. A tunnel runs under the garden between the two towers.

==== Interior spaces ====
The first floor is designed largely as a public space. At the time of opening, the first floor had a drugstore and restaurant. According to plans, the drugstore and restaurant were placed within the northern tower, with the drugstore to the west of the entrance and the restaurant and attached kitchen to the east. The entire first floor in the southern tower, as well as the area behind the drugstore in the northern tower, was devoted to offices. The towers are separated by a garden, and a passage connects both entrances. Since 1989, the 55th Street restaurant space has been occupied by Michael's Restaurant.

The other floors are devoted entirely to apartments. According to Junior's original plans, there were to be 120 apartments of two to six rooms, or 60 in each structure including two duplex suites of six rooms and four maisonette apartments. This was subsequently revised upward to 138 apartments at the time of the building's opening. As of 2014, the number of apartments had decreased to about 120. Each tower has two elevators and two staircases, one each corresponding to the west and east of the first-floor entrance hallway. The elevators are clustered near the center of each tower, while the stair halls are further west and east; these are connected by a single corridor on each floor. The floors of the corridors were laid in terrazzo with carpeting above it. The corridor walls were designed with marble and wood.

Apartments range from studios to two-bedroom units. In the southern tower, the typical story has six apartments, four facing the street and two facing the rear; the northern tower is similar. In the units facing the street, each apartment has one room that extends into the cylindrical bay. These bays are designed as dining rooms or solarium that could fit six to eight people. The bedrooms facing the streets were equipped with air filters and noise cancellation systems. Each apartment was also designed with its own log-burning fireplace. The floors of each apartment were largely made of oak, but the bathroom floors were made of tile and the kitchen floors were made of linoleum. Venetian blinds and window shades were also installed for each window. Penthouses are placed on the setbacks of each tower. Each penthouse level contains four apartments. Glass parapets shielded the living spaces on the upper stories.

== History ==
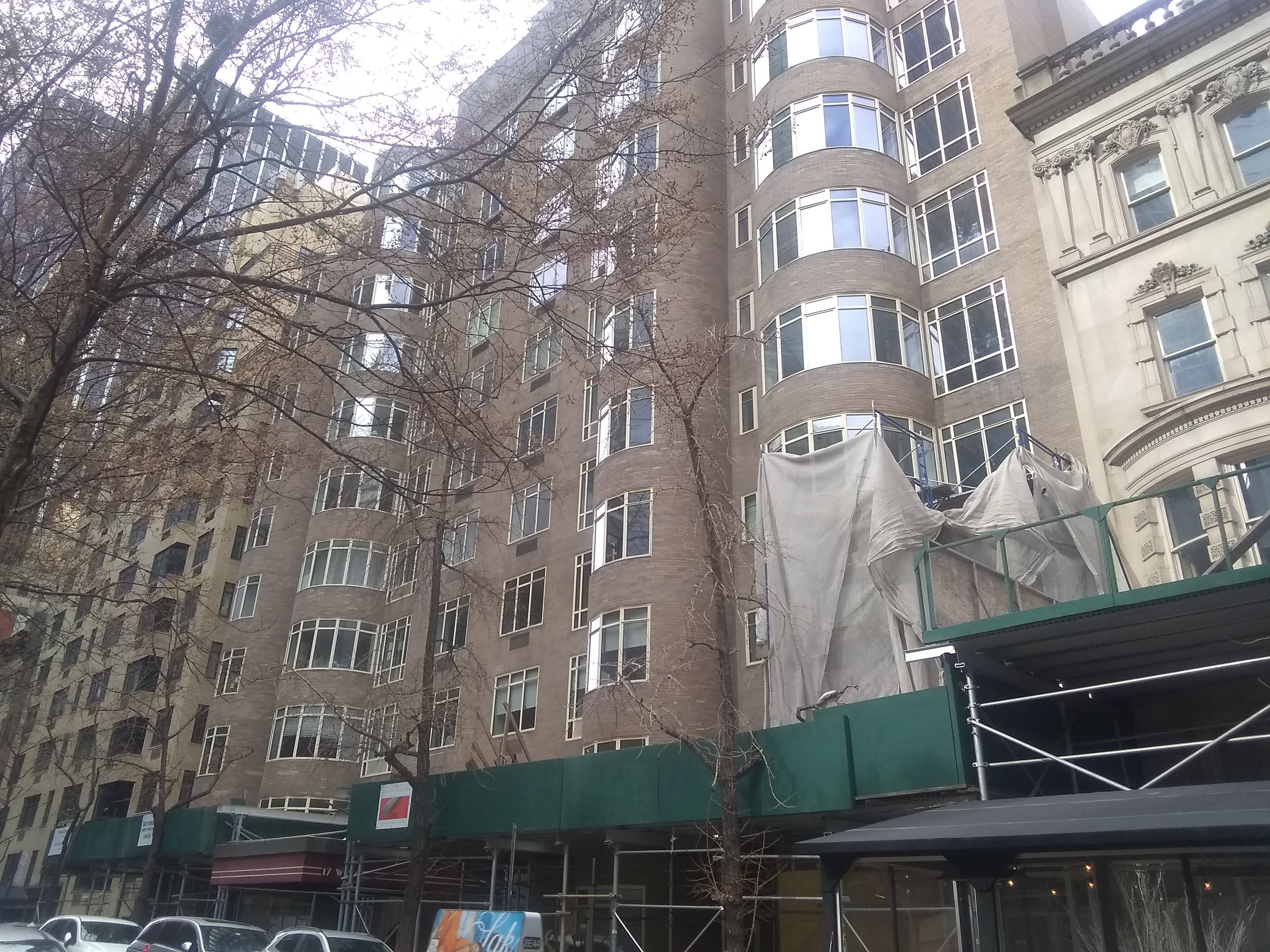
Seen from east, with 15 West 54th Street at right

Rockefeller Center, three city blocks south of the modern Rockefeller Apartments, was built by the Rockefeller family in the 1930s. The "Associated Architects" for that complex's construction were selected in 1929. One member of Rockefeller Center's team, Wallace Harrison, became the Rockefeller family's principal architect and an adviser to Nelson Rockefeller. The two men had become closely acquainted during the development of Rockefeller Center. On the other hand, J. André Fouilhoux never had much to do with Rockefeller Center's development, despite being one of the eight Associated Architects. Nevertheless, Fouilhoux was a partner of Raymond Hood and, after Hood's death in 1934, Fouilhoux and Harrison worked together as well. What would become the Rockefeller Apartments was part of Nelson Rockefeller's goal to entice tenants for Rockefeller Center.

=== Planning and construction ===
In addition to the land acquired for Rockefeller Center, the Rockefeller family acquired land north of the complex to 55th Street. While the city blocks between 52nd and 54th Streets were developed as the 53rd Street Library and MoMA, no development was initially planned for the 54th and 55th Street site itself. The Rockefellers first contemplated renovating the existing houses between 54th and 55th Streets. They ultimately decided on constructing a new apartment development, which they saw as better use of space. Harrison and Fouilhoux initially planned a 13-story apartment with setbacks at the 10th, 12th, and 13th floors. A second proposal called for projecting cylindrical bows, similar to in the final design, but with square porches cut into the extreme ends of each facade, as well as internal porches. In a final blueprint, the internal porches were removed, and two cylindrical bows were added to the rendering of the facade. (Note: The blueprints for the apartments are in the collection of the Avery Architectural and Fine Arts Library of Columbia University. See: "[Rental plan for] 24 West 55th Street [and] 17 West 54th Street, [the Rockefeller Apartments] : [floor plans]". Columbia University. Archived from the original on May 25, 2021. Harrison, Wallace K.; Fouilhoux, Jacques André. "[Rental plans for] 17 West 54th Street [and] 24 West 55th Street, [the Rockefeller Apartments] : [floor plans]". Architectural Drawings and Papers. Columbia University. Archived from the original on May 25, 2021.) Original plans called for a uniform steel superstructure, but the architects came to regard the steel as a secondary concern compared to apartment layouts.

The Rockefellers had acquired these city blocks under various aliases, and it was not until November 1935 that the acquisitions were made public. That month, Junior announced he would construct an apartment complex at 17-23 West 54th Street and 24-36 West 55th Street. The announcement came after the 17 West 54th Street Corporation was incorporated in Albany, the New York state capital, to operate the development. At the time, all but one building on the site had been demolished, and many lots on the surrounding four city blocks had recently changed ownership. The Manhattan Bureau of Buildings received plans for the apartments the next month. Junior also announced he would extend Rockefeller Plaza, a street within Rockefeller Center, north to the apartments at 54th Street. Rockefeller Center's managers acquired land for the proposed street between 1934 and 1937, but the extension was never built, even though some of the buildings on the route were condemned.

The building itself was to cost $2.5 million. Excavations for the site began in March 1936 and the first leases were signed around that time. Among the first tenants was a surgeon who leased two apartments that month. They were conducted rapidly, in what media described as "railroad time". By the end of that month, excavations had been completed and the first steelwork was slated to be erected shortly afterward. When work on the steel began in the first week of April 1936, one-third of the apartments had already been rented. The steel frame was completed during the end of the following month, at which point 86 percent of the units had been leased. The building was ready to receive tenants by October 1, 1936.

=== Use ===
==== 20th century ====
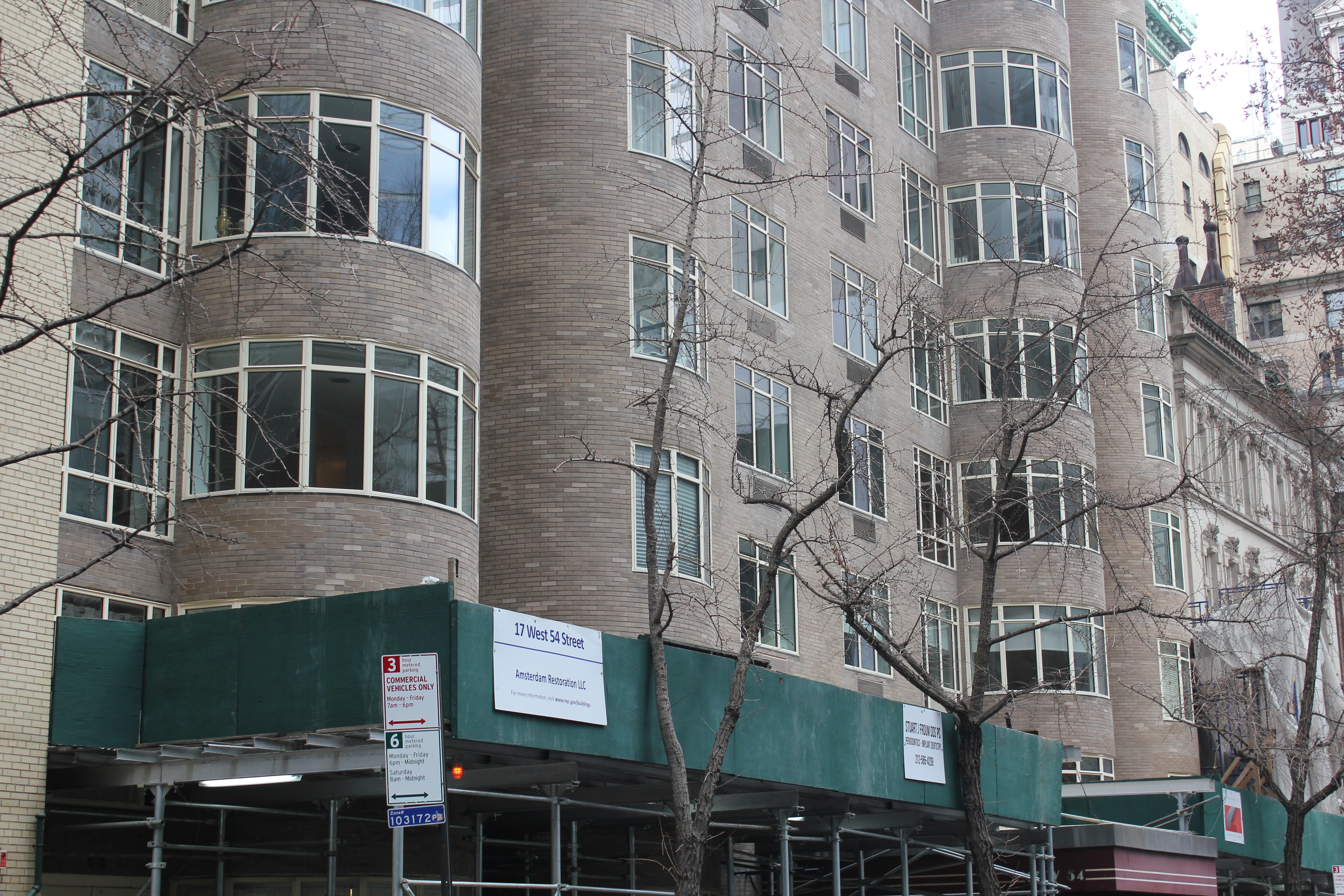
Covered by scaffolding in March 2021

All suites had been rented several days before the apartment complex's scheduled opening. A majority of the lessees were businesspersons working in Midtown, though the apartments were also home to retired businesspersons. The media described the development at the time as "the first important residential development in mid-Manhattan in the last five years". At the time of completion, annual rents ranged from $1,000 to $3,000, except the penthouse apartments, which rented for $2,700 to $3,500 apiece. The towers remained nearly fully occupied even in subsequent years; in 1942, the 54th Street tower was recorded as being completely occupied, while the 55th Street tower had five vacancies.

In 1945, the estate of William Waldorf Astor bought the Rockefeller Apartments for about $1.675 million. The trustee, the City Bank Farmers Trust Company, took the title on behalf of the Astor estate. Henry Goelet acquired the building from the Astors in May 1953, paying an undisclosed sum in cash. The same year, Rockefeller Apartments' management announced a plan to convert the complex to cooperative apartments. Under the plans, tenants would pay a one-time fee of between $5,500 and $16,500 to join the cooperative, then they would pay $7,500 to $12,000 per year for the apartments, excluding the monthly charges of $160 to $275. This was based on an assessed valuation of $3 million, which included a $1.8 million mortgage and $1.2 million from the one-time fees. Goelet proposed to redecorate and renovate public areas. At the time, there were 132 units and five doctors' offices, as well as the drugstore and restaurant. Of the tenants, 51 gathered to oppose the cooperative plan. The cooperative conversion went into effect in June 1954, despite some residents' opposition. The co-op conversion created 70 units.

The LPC held public hearings in 1982 to consider the Rockefeller Apartments and several other structures for city landmark status. The LPC voted on the nomination in June 1984, and, on June 19 of that year, designated the Rockefeller Apartments as a city landmark. The co-op board opposed the landmark designation, and such a status required the board to receive approval from the LPC for every proposed change to the exterior. The restaurant space in the 55th Street tower was occupied by the Italian Pavilion until 1989, when it was replaced by Michael's Restaurant. The restaurant came to be frequented by numerous media personalities. William Leggio Architect renovated the building in 1997.

==== 21st century ====
The building was renovated between 2005 and 2008. The co-op's residents wished to retain the style of the original bricks and steel windows. As a result, some leftover bricks from the original construction were used, and other bricks were fabricated. In 2014, the Rockefeller Apartments received a 30-year mortgage for $23.85 million to finance renovations and pay off another loan. The co-op's president, Thomas Falus, said at the time that the windows needed to be replaced. The New York City Department of Buildings issued two notices of violations for the dilapidated windows in the following four years, which were both resolved. A plan to replace the windows was created in 2018, and the windows were replaced in 2020 and 2021 as part of a $16 million project. As of April 2021, the restaurant space is still occupied by Michael's.

== Critical reception ==
The Rockefeller Apartments were significantly different from previous apartment developments in the city, in that the design aimed to prioritize illumination and air rather than the number of residential units. At the building's opening, Architectural Forum magazine's editors praised the building for lacking any "idiocies" of a modern architectural style, such as corner windows facing each other, as well as horizontal and vertical "treatments". The editors wrote: "Here is sound building, architecture which carries conviction." Architectural critic Lewis Mumford wrote that the building was "the most brilliant and most successful example of modern architecture in the city", and that the ornament "begins to sing like the four-and-twenty blackbirds" when it was perceived from a certain vantage point. Mumford, in particular, praised the curved vertical bays and the glass parapets at the upper stories.

Praise of the building continued in later years. Architectural writer Robert A. M. Stern and the co-authors of his 1987 book New York 1930 said the complex was the first middle-class apartments to be built in Midtown Manhattan in five years. According to Stern and his co-authors, the apartments "introduced a new elegance to efficiently, organized, modestly scaled accommodations and demonstrated that nonhistorical architecture need not necessarily be harsh and mechanistic". Critic Carter B. Horsley wrote that the project's relatively cheap cost and lack of detailing were positive attributes for the building. Referencing Mumford's comments, Horsley stated, "As a midblock, mid-rise design, it is very attractive even when the blackbirds are not whirring."

== Notable residents ==
- Oscar Homolka, actor, lived on 55th Street
- Benjamin Kaye, lawyer and playwright, lived on 54th Street
- Blanche Knopf, publisher, lived on 55th Street
- Gertrude Lawrence, actress, lived on 54th Street
- Jules Levey, producer, lived on 55th Street
- Alice Marble, tennis player
- Douglas McGrath, director
- Bernard Newman, designer, lived on 54th Street
- Irene Rich, actress, lived on 55th Street
- Alexis de Sakhnoffsky, designer, lived on 54th Street
- Olga Samaroff, pianist, lived on 55th Street
- George David Weiss, songwriter

== See also ==
- List of New York City Designated Landmarks in Manhattan from 14th to 59th Streets
