= 7 West 54th Street =

Building in Manhattan, New York

- Philip Lehman Residence
- U.S. Historic district – Contributing property
- New York City Landmark
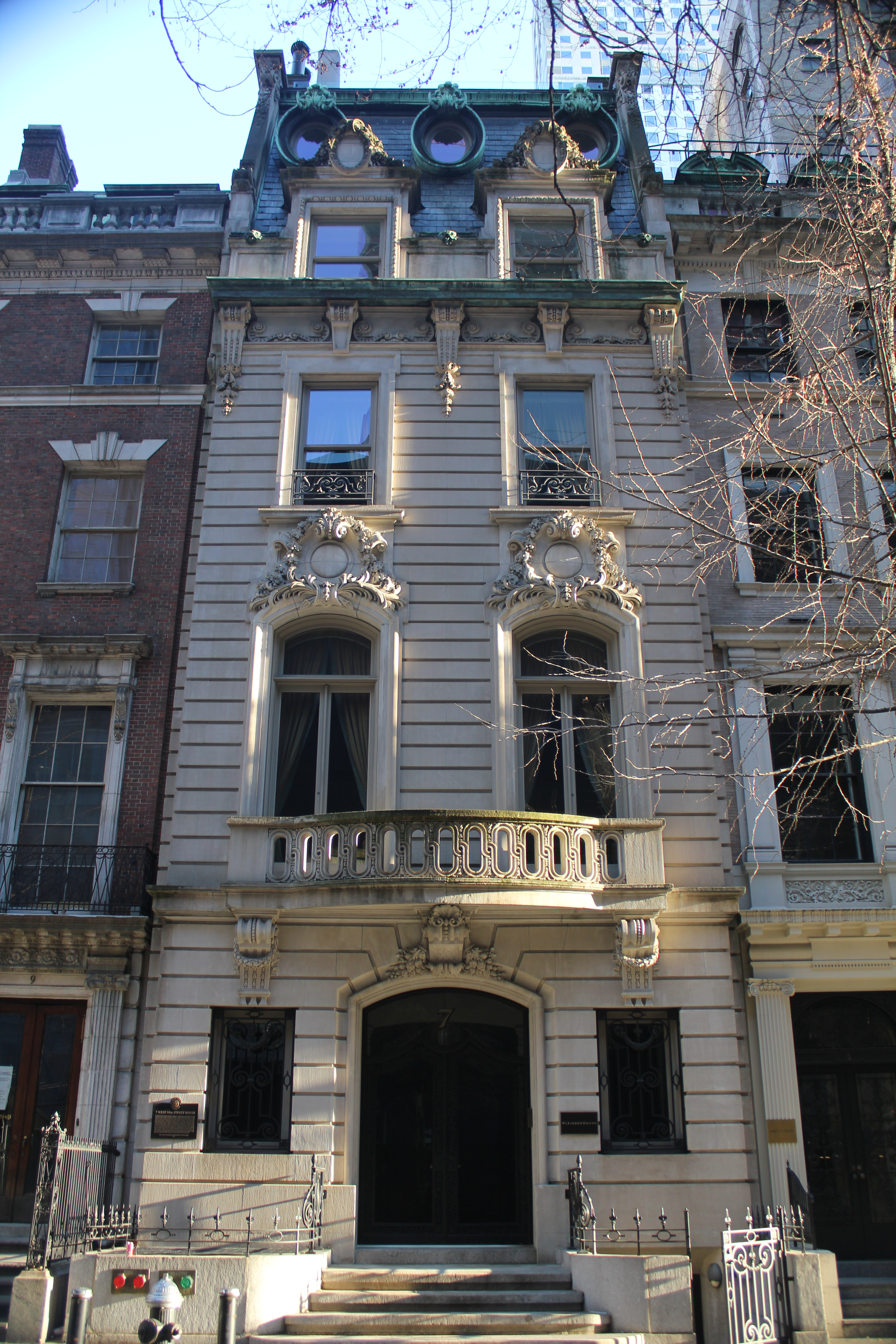
- (February 2022)
- Location: 7 West 54th Street, Manhattan, New York, US
- Coordinates: 40°45′42″N 73°58′34″W
- Architect: John H. Duncan
- Architectural style: French Beaux Arts
- Part of: Residences at 5-15 West 54th Street (ID89002260)
- NYCL No.: 1102

Significant dates
- Designated CP: January 4, 1990
- Designated NYCL: February 3, 1981

7 West 54th Street (also the Philip Lehman Residence) is a commercial building in the Midtown Manhattan neighborhood of New York City, United States. It is along 54th Street's northern sidewalk between Fifth Avenue and Sixth Avenue. The four-story building was designed by John H. Duncan in the French Beaux-Arts style and was constructed between 1899 and 1900 as a private residence. It is one of five consecutive townhouses erected along the same city block during the 1890s, the others being 5, 11, and 13 and 15 West 54th Street.

The facade is made entirely of limestone, with a smooth facade at the first floor and rusticated blocks on the upper stories. Above the centrally positioned main entrance is a balcony at the second story. The house is topped by a slate mansard roof. The house was built with twelve rooms and various hallways and alcoves. Much of the interior furnishings from the house's completion in 1900 have been removed or relocated.

The house was commissioned for banker Philip Lehman, who lived in the house until he died in 1947. The house was then occupied by his son Robert Lehman, who lived there until his own death in 1969. The house was then sold in 1974. The New York City Landmarks Preservation Commission designated the house as an official landmark in 1981, and it was added to the National Register of Historic Places in 1990 as part of the 5–15 West 54th Street Residences historic district. The building was purchased by a group of investors in 2005, and Belmont Freeman was hired to renovate the building the next year, largely to the house's original design.

== Site ==
7 West 54th Street is in the Midtown Manhattan neighborhood of New York City, United States. It is along the northern sidewalk of 54th Street between Fifth Avenue and Sixth Avenue. The land lot is rectangular and covers 2,510 square feet (233 m^{2}), with a frontage of 25 feet (7.6 m) on 54th Street and a depth of 100.42 feet (30.61 m). The building is the second easternmost of five consecutive townhouses erected along the same city block, with 5 West 54th Street to its east, as well as 11, and 13 and 15 West 54th Street to its west. The five townhouses are adjoined by the Rockefeller Apartments to the west, The Peninsula New York and the St. Regis New York hotels to the northeast, the University Club of New York and 689 Fifth Avenue to the east, the William H. Moore House and Saint Thomas Church to the southeast, and the Museum of Modern Art to the south.

Fifth Avenue between 42nd Street and Central Park South (59th Street) was relatively undeveloped through the late 19th century. The surrounding area was once part of the common lands of the city of New York. The Commissioners' Plan of 1811 established Manhattan's street grid with lots measuring 100 feet (30 m) deep and 25 feet (7.6 m) wide. Upscale residences were constructed around Fifth Avenue following the American Civil War. The two-block stretch of West and East 54th Street from Madison Avenue to Sixth Avenue, bisected by Fifth Avenue, was developed with the houses of prominent figures such as William Henry Moore, John R. Platt, and John D. Rockefeller Sr. The sites of the five houses at 5–15 West 54th Street, along with the University Club, were formerly occupied by St. Luke's Hospital, which moved out during 1896.

== Architecture ==
The houses at 5–15 West 54th Street, all developed in the late 1890s for wealthy clients, were designed as a cohesive grouping, unlike other residences in the neighborhood. According to The New York Times, the houses form the sole remaining "real strip of mansions" in Midtown Manhattan. The houses at 5, 7, 9–11, and 13 and 15 West 54th Street all had different architects. 7 West 54th Street was designed by John H. Duncan in the French Beaux-Arts style. Russell Sturgis, writing for Architectural Record in 1900, described the house as having a "simple and direct conception" with its symmetrical entrance and balcony.

=== Facade ===
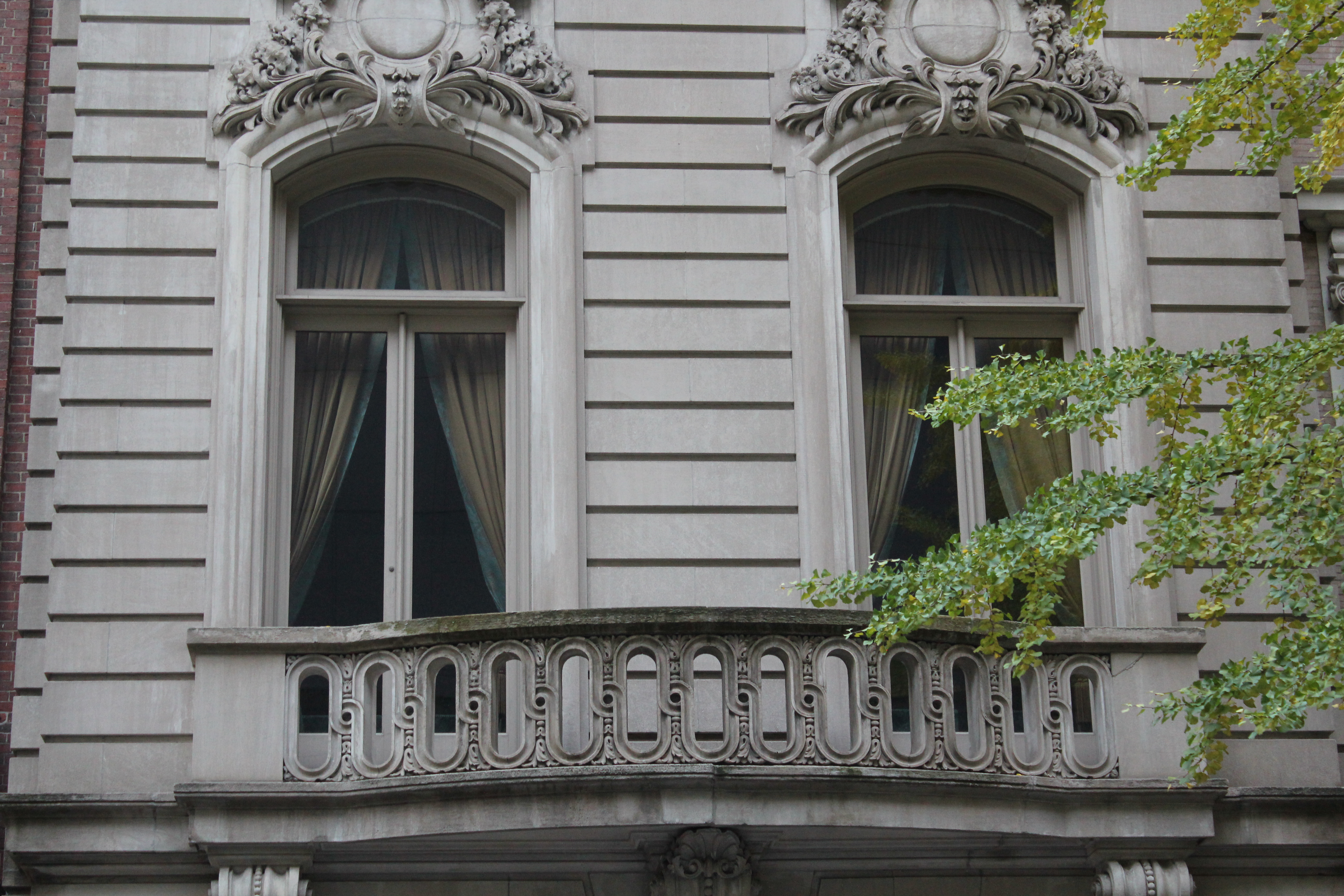
Detail of second-story balcony

The building is four and a half stories tall and two bays wide. It slightly projects outward from the townhouses on each side (number 5 on the east and number 11 on the west). The entire facade is clad with rusticated blocks of limestone. From the ground level, a low stoop with four steps leads to the first-floor entrance, at the center of the facade. The main entrance is composed of a set of double glass doors inside a segmental arch. There is an ornate cartouche above the doorway, with carvings of garlands. On either side of the main entrance is one rectangular window, each with an iron grille. Above either window are ornamented brackets, which contain garlands. The brackets, as well as the cartouche above the main doorway, support the second-floor balcony.

The balcony at the second story is slightly bowed outward and has a railing with oval openings. Behind the balcony are two French windows, above which are elaborate cartouches. The tops of these cartouches support window sills below either of the two windows at the third story. The third-story openings are double-hung windows with iron grilles in front of their lower panes, surrounded by a simple molding. There is a cornice above the third story, supported by five console brackets (three large and two small) that alternate with a band of foliate ornament. Above the cornice is a slate mansard roof. Two dormer windows project from the roof; each is surrounded by an egg-and-dart molding and is topped by a cartouche. At the attic are three copper-framed ocular windows, each with their own cartouche, as well as a limestone coping along the ridge of the roof. The house's original exterior is mostly intact except for the windows on the second and third stories, which are replacements.

=== Interior ===
The house has 16,676 square feet (1,549.3 m^{2}) of interior space. Much of the interior furnishings from the house's completion in 1900 have been removed or relocated. The house was built with twelve rooms and various hallways and alcoves. The second floor has a high ceiling with a staircase that wraps around itself twice. In the early 21st century, one of the few original design elements that remained was a projecting bay of leaded-glass windows designed in the Gothic style, with spiral-fluted columns on each side.

Many of the details were modified in the 1960s when the house contained the art collection of financier Robert Lehman. After a renovation in 1962, the reception salon at the ground story was decorated with Italian art, green velvet walls, and a green-carpeted floor. A staircase with marble banister led up to a second-floor drawing room and a sitting room with red velvet walls. The dining room had a marble parquet floor and ceiling with leaded-glass windows. The third floor had a room with Flemish artwork, yellow velvet walls, and a fireplace, as well as another room with 19th-century artwork. The fourth floor had drawings, while various alcoves and hallways had grotesques and sculptures. Part of this renovated interior is replicated at the Robert Lehman Wing of the Metropolitan Museum of Art, also known as the Met. Some of the original decorative elements were reinstalled during a renovation in the 2000s.

== History ==
=== Residence ===
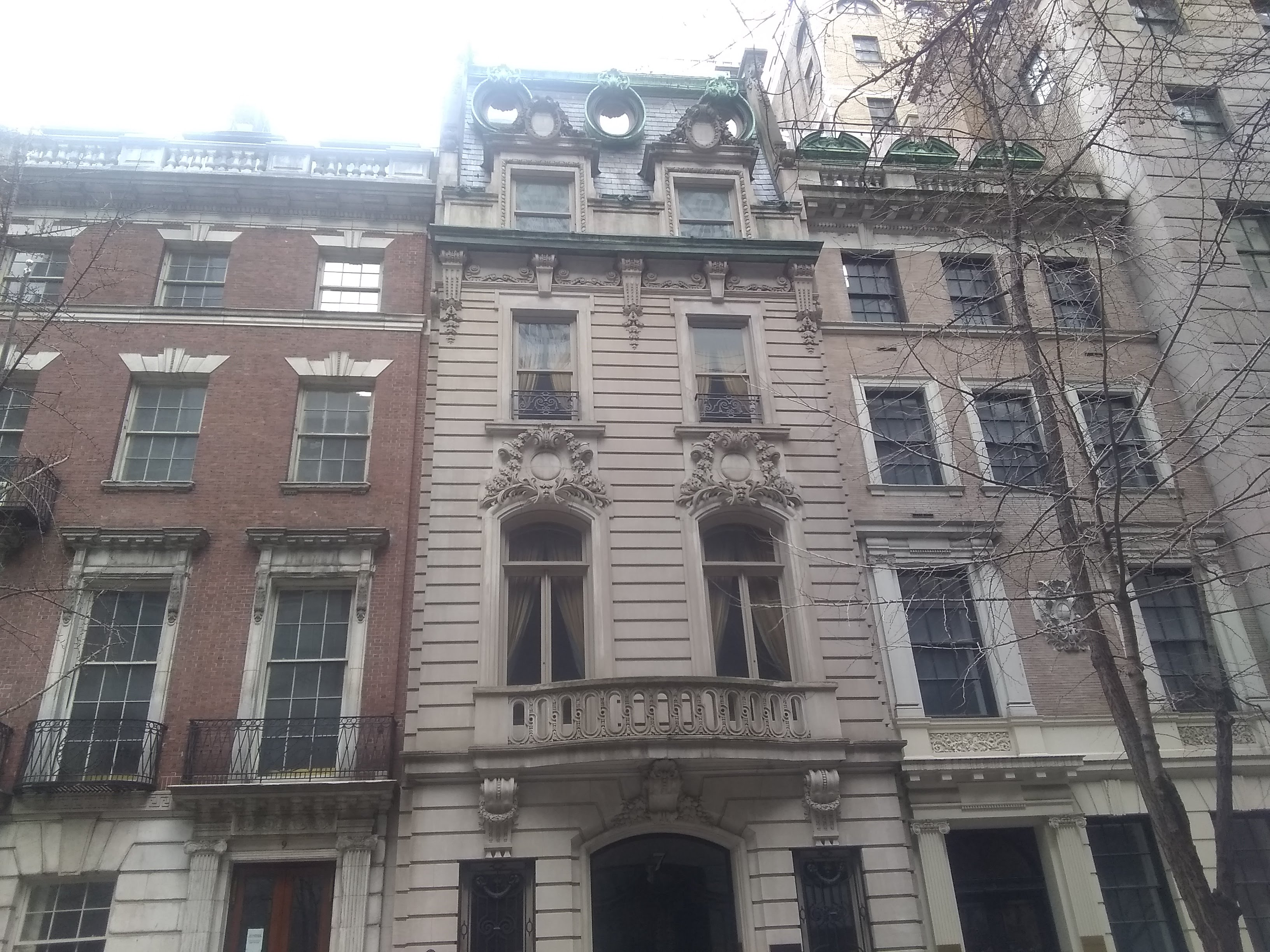
Seen in March 2021, with 5 West 54th Street at right and 9–11 West 54th Street at left

In 1896, with the relocation of St. Luke's Hospital from Midtown to Morningside Heights, Manhattan, the hospital's former site on the northern side of 54th Street west of Fifth Avenue became available for development. The University Club, whose construction commenced the same year, was the first structure to be built on the former hospital plot. In March 1899, Philip Lehman acquired a plot on 54th Street about 200 feet (61 m) west of Fifth Avenue. Philip Lehman was a prominent banker whose father Emanuel had formed the firm Lehman Brothers. John H. Duncan was commissioned to design a house on the site. Duncan filed plans for the house with the New York City Department of Buildings in May 1899, with the house projected to cost $48,000.

The house was completed in 1900. It was initially occupied by the Lehman family, consisting of Philip, his wife Carrie, and their children Pauline and Robert. The Lehmans began collecting major artworks for their house in approximately 1905. The art collection grew to include works by artists including Francisco Goya, El Greco, and Rembrandt. The surrounding neighborhood rapidly became a commercial zone after World War I, and many neighboring townhouses were converted to commercial use, but the Lehman family retained the house for several decades. Carrie Lehman died at the house in 1937. By then, both Lehman children had moved to their own houses on Park Avenue. Philip lived as a widower at 7 West 54th Street for another decade until he died in 1947.

After his father's death, Robert Lehman took over the house and used it to store his own art collection. The house was not used as a residence, and the collection was not publicly accessible. Robert continued to live on Park Avenue, although he did invite friends and art scholars to visit the 54th Street house. Serge Royaux redesigned the interiors in 1962. The art collection was displayed publicly for the first time in November 1962, when a hundred people paid $50 apiece to view the collection as part of an art benefit. Throughout the 1960s, the art collection was made publicly accessible to raise money for benefits. This included fundraisers for New York University in 1963 and 1964; the Citizens' Committee for Children in 1965; the Neurological Institute of Presbyterian Hospital in 1966; and the Wellesley College Friends of Art in 1967. A reporter for the Associated Press called the Lehman collection "one of the few great art collections remaining in private hands".

=== Later use ===
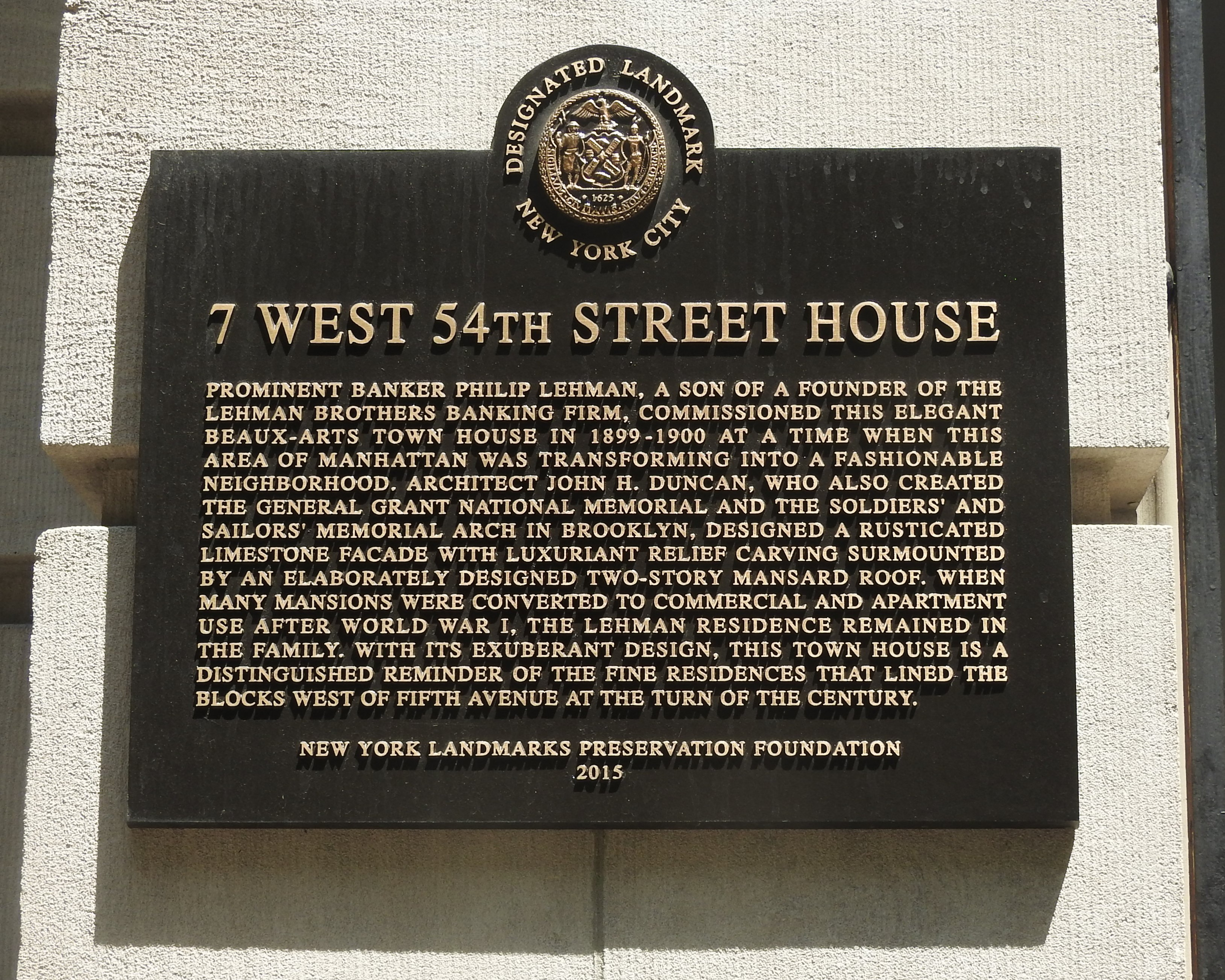
New York City Landmark plaque at building's entrance

When Robert Lehman died in 1969, his art collection had 3,000 works. In his will, Robert requested that the Met preserve the house in exchange for the Met receiving his entire art collection, so the artwork could be displayed in a similar context to how it had been assembled. Originally, Lehman wished for the Met to disassemble the whole house and relocate it to the museum building, but the Met ultimately only disassembled the interiors. Seven rooms were rebuilt to the Met's building, where it was reassembled as the Robert Lehman Wing, which opened in 1975. Meanwhile, ownership of the Lehman house was transferred to the 7 West 54th Street Realty Corporation in 1974.

The New York City Landmarks Preservation Commission designated the five houses at 5–15 West 54th Street as city landmarks, including the Lehman residence, on February 3, 1981. The Committee for the Preservation of West 54th and West 55th Streets had pushed for the landmark designation. At the time, the five houses were in various states of preservation: the double house at 9–11 West 54th Street was being restored, but the twin houses at 13 and 15 West 54th Street had been proposed for demolition. On January 4, 1990, the building was added to the National Register of Historic Places as part of the Residences at 5–15 West 54th Street historic district. The 7 West 54th Street Realty Corporation gave ownership of the building to ZGNY Real Estate, LLC, in 2000.

The building was purchased by a group of investors in 2005 for $13 million. The next year, hedge fund Zimmer Lucas Partners hired Belmont Freeman to renovate the building. Some of the original decorative elements were deaccessioned from the Met's collection, as the Met had not been able to use them. Other decorative elements, which could not be deaccessioned, were replicated using plaster molds. The house was also extended at its rear, and a terrace with a retractable glass canopy was added to the roof. The interior was converted to an office building with trading floor equipment. After the renovation was completed, the house had a temporary certificate of occupancy for several years. In May 2012, the building was placed on sale for $65 million, or about $4,000 per square foot ($43,000/m^{2}). The asking price was subsequently reduced to $50 million, and the house was sold to Pleiades House LLC in 2013 for $40 million. Afterward, the house served as an office for talent management agency IMG Artists.

== See also ==
- List of New York City Designated Landmarks in Manhattan from 14th to 59th Streets
- National Register of Historic Places listings in Manhattan from 14th to 59th Streets
