= 13 and 15 West 54th Street =

Buildings in Manhattan, New York

- William Murray Residences
- U.S. Historic district – Contributing property
- New York City Landmark
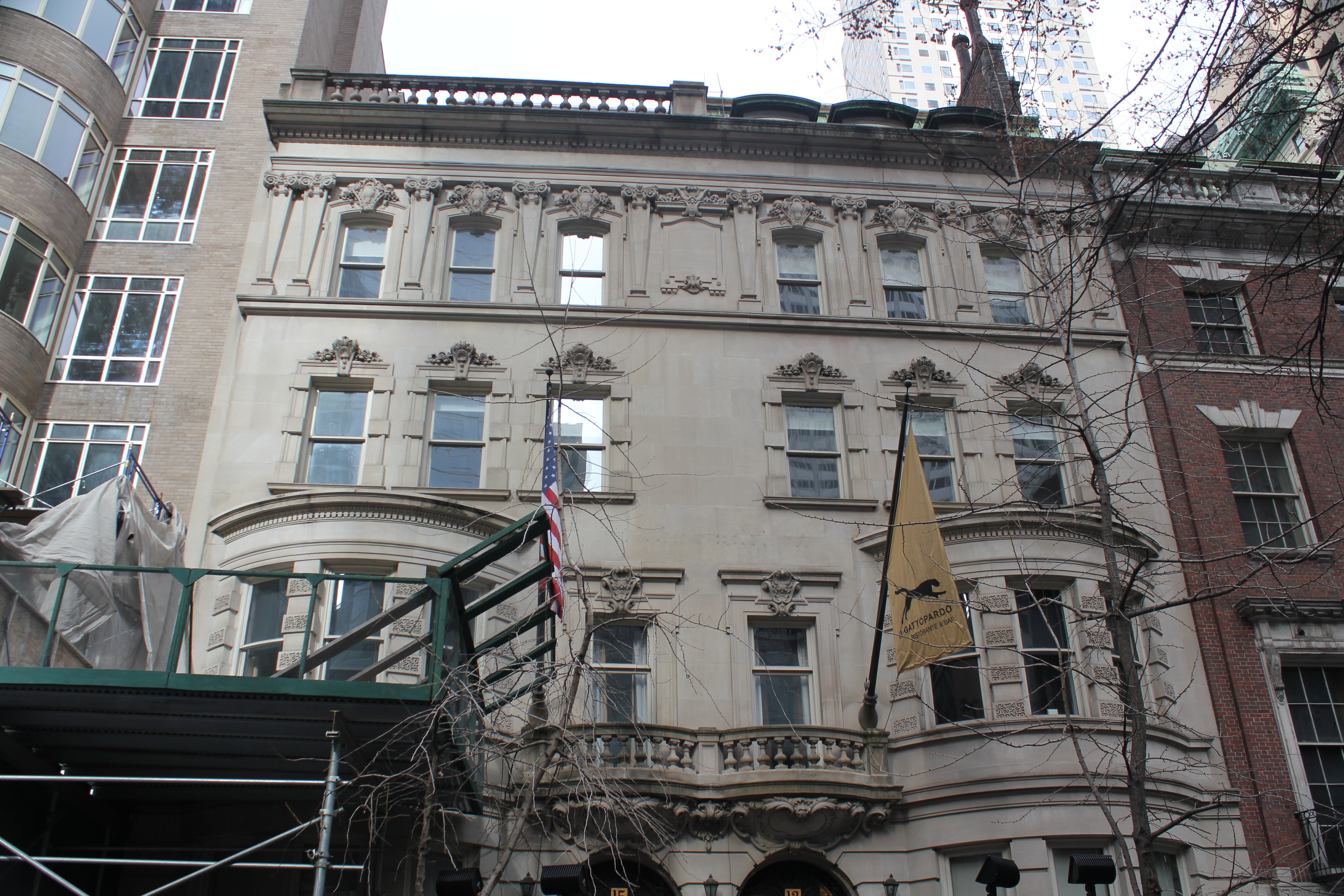
- The houses as seen in March 2021 (number 15 at left and number 13 at right)
- Location: 13–15 West 54th Street, Manhattan, New York, US
- Coordinates: 40°45′42″N 73°58′35″W
- Architect: Henry Janeway Hardenbergh
- Architectural style: Renaissance inspired
- Part of: Residences at 5-15 West 54th Street (ID89002260)
- NYCL No.: 1104, 1105

Significant dates
- Designated CP: January 4, 1990
- Designated NYCL: February 3, 1981

13 and 15 West 54th Street (also the William Murray Residences) are two commercial buildings in the Midtown Manhattan neighborhood of New York City, United States. They are along 54th Street's northern sidewalk between Fifth Avenue and Sixth Avenue. The four-and-a-half-story houses were designed by Henry Janeway Hardenbergh in the Renaissance-inspired style and were constructed between 1896 and 1897 as private residences. They are the two westernmost of five consecutive townhouses erected along the same city block during the 1890s, the others being 5, 7, and 9–11 West 54th Street.

The buildings were designed as a nearly identical pair of houses. The facade is made of limestone with rusticated blocks on the first story and smooth blocks on the upper stories. The houses contain a rounded oriel facing 54th Street and a central pair of entrances above the raised basement. The houses are nearly identical except for their roofs; the eastern house at number 13 has a mansard roof while the western house at number 15 has a balustrade.

The houses were commissioned for businessman William Murray, who respectively sold 13 and 15 West 54th to Jessie Neilson and James B. Dickson. Number 13 was purchased by John D. Rockefeller Sr. in 1906 and served as the home of his son and daughter-in-law, John D. Rockefeller Jr. and Abby Aldrich Rockefeller, until 1913, after which it was leased by various families through the 1950s. Ownership of number 15 was much more stable, as the Dicksons occupied the site until 1953. Nelson Rockefeller used number 13 as an office from the 1940s until his death in 1979, and he bought number 15 and operated it as the Museum of Primitive Art from 1957 to 1979. The New York City Landmarks Preservation Commission designated the house as an official landmark in 1981, and it was added to the National Register of Historic Places in 1990 as part of the 5–15 West 54th Street Residences historic district.

== Site ==
13 and 15 West 54th Street are in the Midtown Manhattan neighborhood of New York City, United States. They are along the northern sidewalk of 54th Street between Fifth Avenue and Sixth Avenue. The land lots are both rectangular and each cover 2,513 square feet (233.5 m^{2}), with a frontage of 25 feet (7.6 m) on 54th Street and a depth of 100.42 feet (30.61 m). The buildings are the westernmost of five consecutive townhouses erected along the same city block; from east to west, the other houses are 5, 7, and 9–11 West 54th Street. The five townhouses are adjoined by the Rockefeller Apartments to the west, The Peninsula New York and the St. Regis New York hotels to the northeast, the University Club of New York and 689 Fifth Avenue to the east, the William H. Moore House and Saint Thomas Church to the southeast, and the Museum of Modern Art to the south.

Fifth Avenue between 42nd Street and Central Park South (59th Street) was relatively undeveloped through the late 19th century. The surrounding area was once part of the common lands of the city of New York. The Commissioners' Plan of 1811 established Manhattan's street grid with lots measuring 100 feet (30 m) deep and 25 feet (7.6 m) wide. Upscale residences were constructed around Fifth Avenue following the American Civil War. The two-block stretch of West and East 54th Street from Madison Avenue to Sixth Avenue, bisected by Fifth Avenue, was developed with the houses of prominent figures such as William Henry Moore, John R. Platt, and John D. Rockefeller Sr. The sites of the five houses at 5–15 West 54th Street, along with the University Club, were formerly occupied by St. Luke's Hospital, which moved out during 1896.

== Architecture ==
The houses at 5–15 West 54th Street, all developed in the late 1890s for wealthy clients, were designed as a cohesive grouping, unlike other residences in the neighborhood. According to The New York Times, the houses form the sole remaining "real strip of mansions" in Midtown Manhattan. The houses at 5, 7, 9–11, and 13 and 15 West 54th Street all had different architects. The twin houses at 13 and 15 West 54th Street were designed by Henry Janeway Hardenbergh in the Renaissance-inspired style.

=== Facade ===
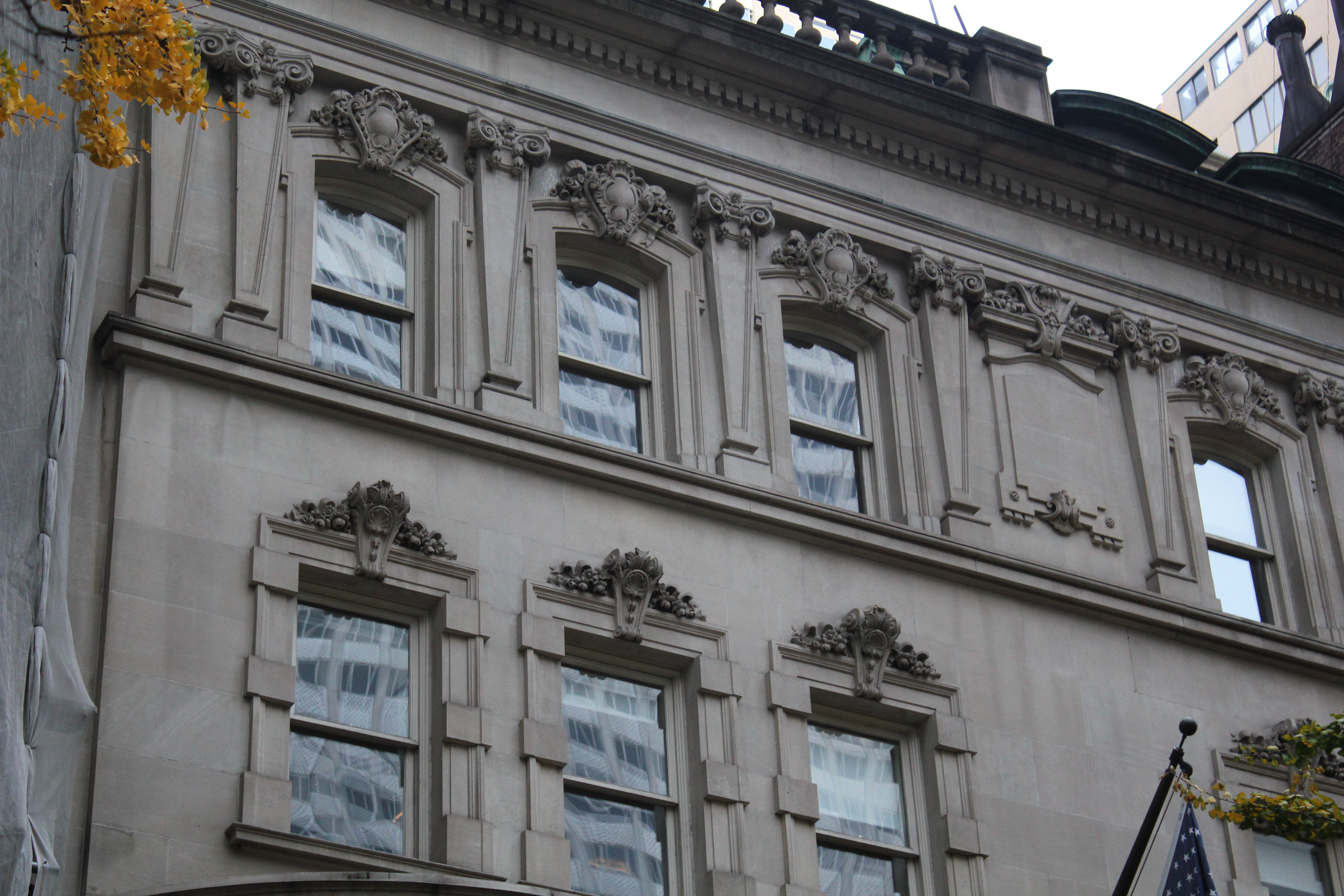
Close-up of fourth story windows on number 15

The buildings are both three bays wide on their street facade. The exteriors are nearly mirror images of each other, except that number 13 has an attic story and number 15 does not. The basement and first floor of both buildings are clad with rusticated blocks of limestone, while the three upper floors are clad with smooth limestone. The houses' original exteriors are intact. In front of both houses, there is a depressed areaway, with steps descending to the basement level on the outer end of the shared facade (corresponding to the left side of number 15 and the right side of number 13). At the top of each depressed areaway are two brackets with carvings of grotesques, which support double-story oriels above them.

The center of the shared facade, corresponding to the right side of number 13 and left side of number 15, has a symmetrical pair of curved stoops. The stoops are doglegs that run east from the middle of number 15 and west from the middle of number 13. On the portion of the stoop wall facing the sidewalk are oval vents with iron grilles, above which are cartouches. At the top of each stoop is an archway with a wood-and-glass double door. Above either door is an ornate cartouche. The cartouches support second-story balconies with stone balustrades, which are curved outward. Behind each of these balconies are windows topped by eared architraves that flank ornate keystones. The double-story oriels occupy the first and second stories on the left side of number 15 and the right side of number 13. Each oriel contains three windows per story. The windows on the second story of the oriel are flanked by vermiculated blocks.

The third story of each house has three windows that are centered to their respective facades. The third-story windows are flanked by vermiculated blocks and topped by lintels with elaborate scrolled keystones. Below the fourth floor is a stone string course that doubles as the sill for the fourth-story windows. There are also three windows on the fourth story of each house, as well as a carved plaque at the center of the facade between numbers 15 and 13. The windows and plaque are flanked by Ionic pilasters with pedestals at the bottom and volutes at the top. An additional pilaster, pedestal, and volute are at either extreme end of the shared facade. Above the fourth floor is a denticulated cornice. Number 13 has a copper mansard roof with three dormer windows, while number 15 has a balustrade above the cornice.

=== Interior ===
The interiors of the houses contain ceilings that range from 10 to 17 feet (3.0 to 5.2 m) high. As of 2013, the basement and first floor are used by Italian restaurant Il Gattopardo. The basement contains the restaurant's party room while the first story contains the main dining area. The top two stories of the two townhouses are connected to 20 West 55th Street, a 13-story office building, at their rears. Construction of the office building, designed by Emery Roth & Sons, involved replacing the rear walls of numbers 13 and 15 with glass, overlooking the office building's five-story atrium. Including the office addition, the structures occupy a total of 97,500 square feet (9,060 m^{2}).

== History ==
=== Residences ===
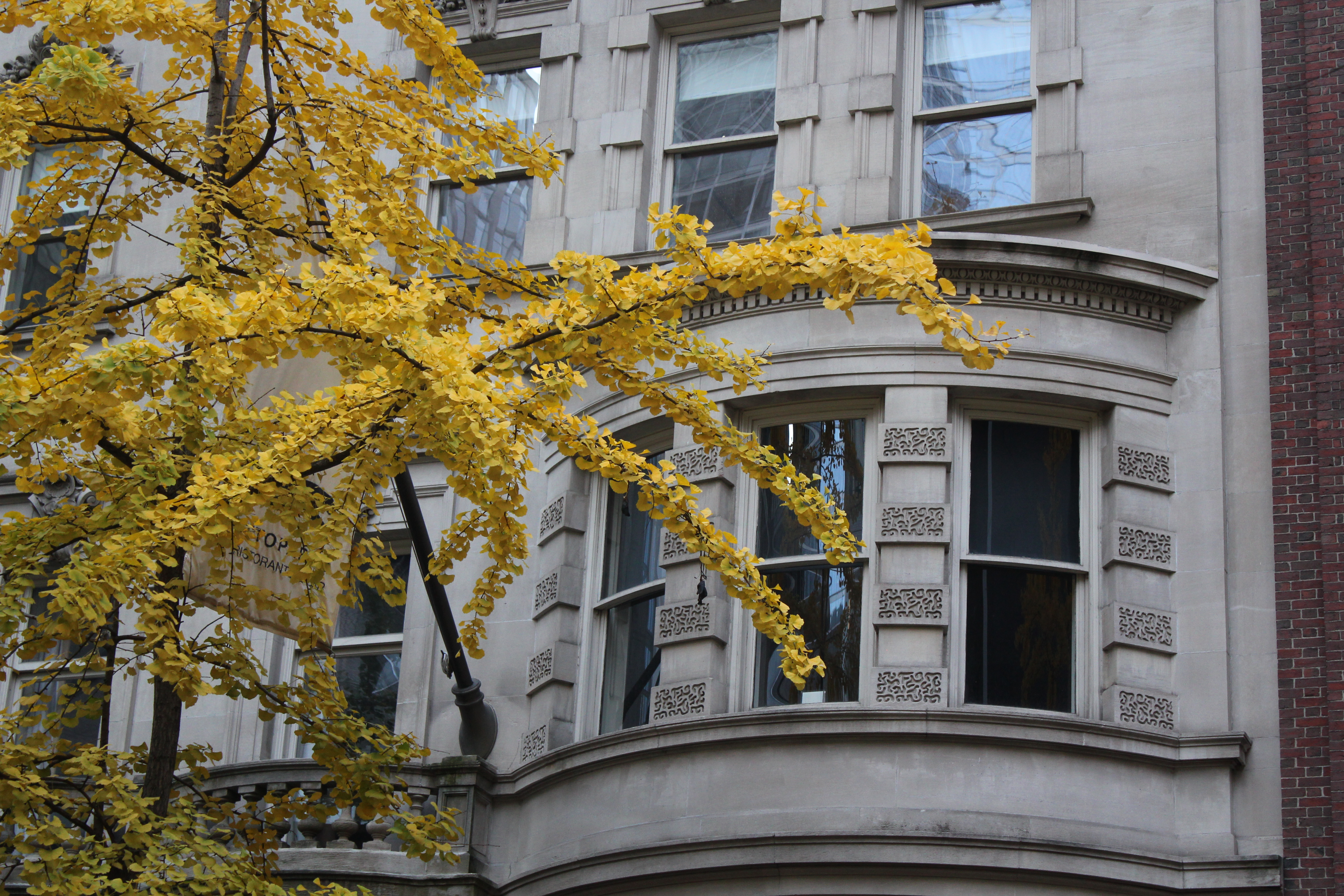
Detail of number 13's oriel at the second story

In 1896, with the relocation of St. Luke's Hospital from Midtown to Morningside Heights, Manhattan, the hospital's former site on the northern side of 54th Street west of Fifth Avenue became available for development. The University Club, whose construction commenced the same year, was the first structure to be built on the former hospital plot. Unlike the other three mansions on 5–15 West 54th Street, the houses at 13 and 15 West 54th Street were developed as speculative developments instead of being purposefully built for a specific family. William Murray had bought two of the St. Luke's lots in July 1895 for $125,000. Henry J. Hardenbergh was commissioned to design a pair of houses on the two lots. The architect filed plans for the house with the New York City Department of Buildings around 1896.

The houses were completed circa 1898. Murray conveyed number 13, approximately 275 feet (84 m) west of Fifth Avenue, to Jessie L. Nielson in January 1898. Financier and oil heir John D. "Junior" Rockefeller Jr., along with Abby Aldrich Rockefeller, rented number 13 in 1901, around the same time they were married. The house was just across from the residence of Junior's father, John D. Rockefeller, at 4 West 54th Street. At the time of the lease, a columnist for the New-York Tribune wrote, "John D. Rockefeller, Jr. certainly has no regard for unlucky thirteen." Next door, Murray retained ownership of number 15 until late 1905, when the firm Pease & Elliman sold that house. The buyer was Johnson & Higgins Insurance Company president James B. Dickson, who finalized his purchase in January 1906.

Four of John and Abby Rockefeller's children were born while the Rockefellers lived at number 13, starting with their eldest child, Abby, in 1903. John D. Rockefeller III was born at number 13 in March 1906. The same month, Murray sold the land under the east wall of number 13 to Jessie Neilson. She filed plans for an expansion of number 13, to be designed by Delano & Aldrich. The plans called for the addition of the fifth-story attic, a sun parlor at the rear, and a new window and elevator at a cost of $10,000. Nielson sold the house to Junior's father shortly afterward in May 1906. John Sr, in turn, gave the house to Junior in 1909. Two more Rockefeller children were born while the Rockefellers lived at number 13: Nelson in 1908, at their New England summer home, and Laurance in 1910, in New York City. By 1912, the Rockefellers desired a new house for their four young children. The family moved to 10 West 54th Street, across the street from number 13.

Junior leased his old residence to Mrs. William W. Borden of Chicago in 1913. Borden leased number 13 in 1918 to Howard W. Maxwell, an Atlas Portland Cement Company vice president and New York Trust Company director. Maxwell and his wife used number 13 as their city residence and kept a country residence on Long Island. The surrounding neighborhood rapidly became a commercial zone after World War I, and many neighboring townhouses were converted to commercial use, but the Rockefellers and Dicksons respectively retained ownership of their houses. The Rockefellers leased number 13 to Robert Abel-Smith in 1932, and the surgeon Charles W. Depping had an office there by 1936. After James B. Dickson's death at an unknown date, his widow Harriet continued to live at number 15 until her death in March 1953.

=== Rockefeller museum and offices ===
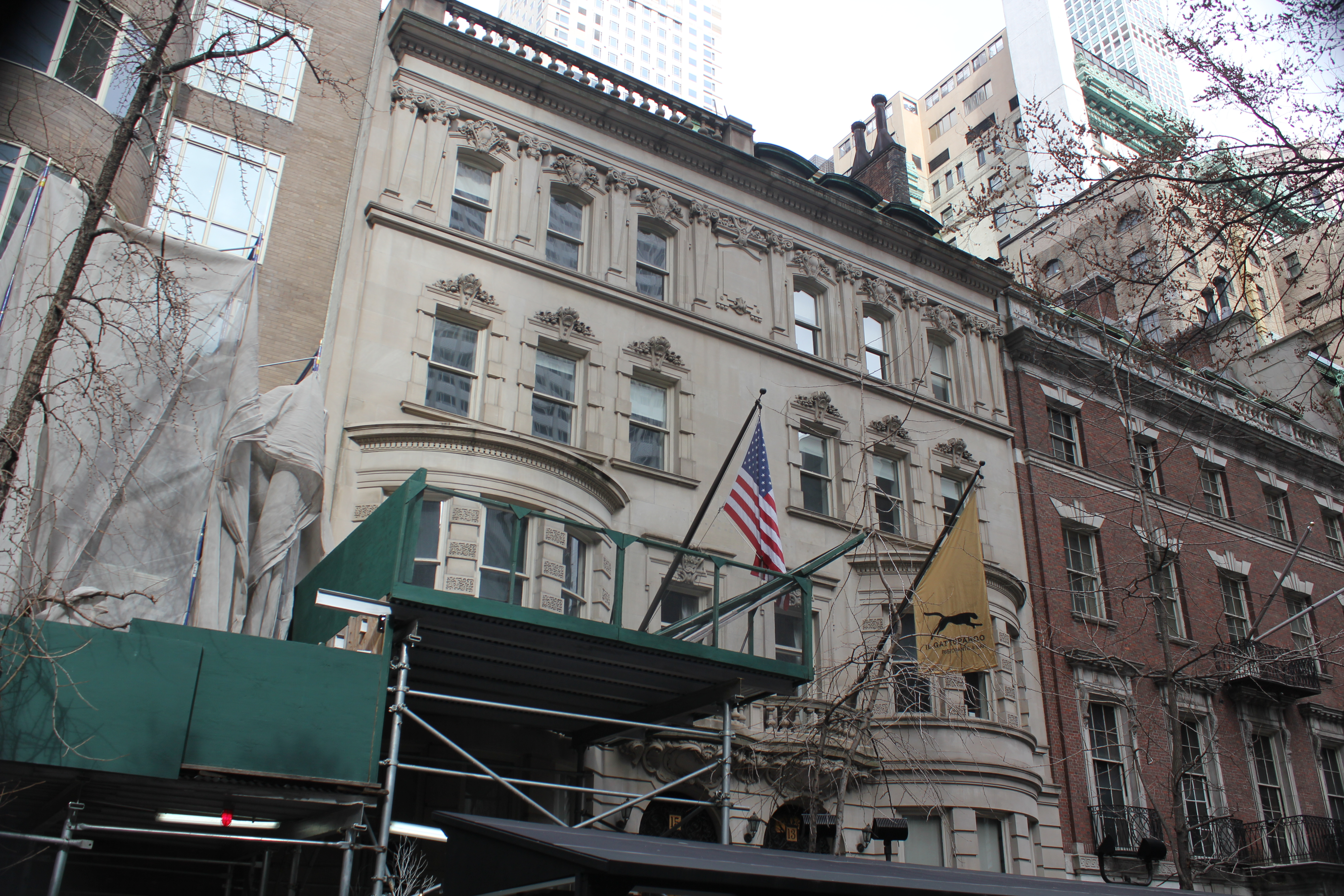
Rockefeller Apartments at left and 11 West 54th Street at right in March 2021

In October 1953, Nelson Rockefeller, who already owned number 13, acquired the twin townhouse at number 15. The next year, Rockefeller established the Museum of Primitive Art, a collection of ancient art that he intended to display in number 15. The art collection had been assembled over the previous decade but had never been shown together. Rockefeller wished to renovate a portion of the townhouse and anticipated expanding it with the growth of his collection. In 1955, Rockefeller acquired number 15. Over the next two years, the interior of the residence was extensively renovated, with space for the collection's items on the lowest two floors, as well as library space on the upper two floors. The Museum of Primitive Art opened to the public in February 1957. The museum's collection of over a thousand pieces was transferred to the Metropolitan Museum of Art (Met) in 1969. The Museum of Primitive Art closed in 1976 and its collections were transferred to the Met.

Nelson Rockefeller maintained a luncheon space and private office next door at number 13, which was connected by a passageway to his offices on 20–22 West 55th Street. During the 1960s, when Rockefeller served as the Governor of New York, the 55th Street buildings were described by The New York Times as the "unofficial Capitol of New York State", and 13 West 54th Street served as a rear entrance and exit to his 55th Street offices. Rockefeller retained the office throughout the rest of his life, even when he served as the Vice President of the United States from 1974 to 1977. A little more than two years after leaving the vice presidency, Rockefeller suffered a heart attack and died at his 54th Street office in January 1979. The heart attack occurred in the presence of aide Megan Marshack, who called a friend to report Rockefeller's heart attack to emergency operators. In his will, "no specific disposition" of the houses at 13–15 West 54th Street was recorded.

=== Later use ===
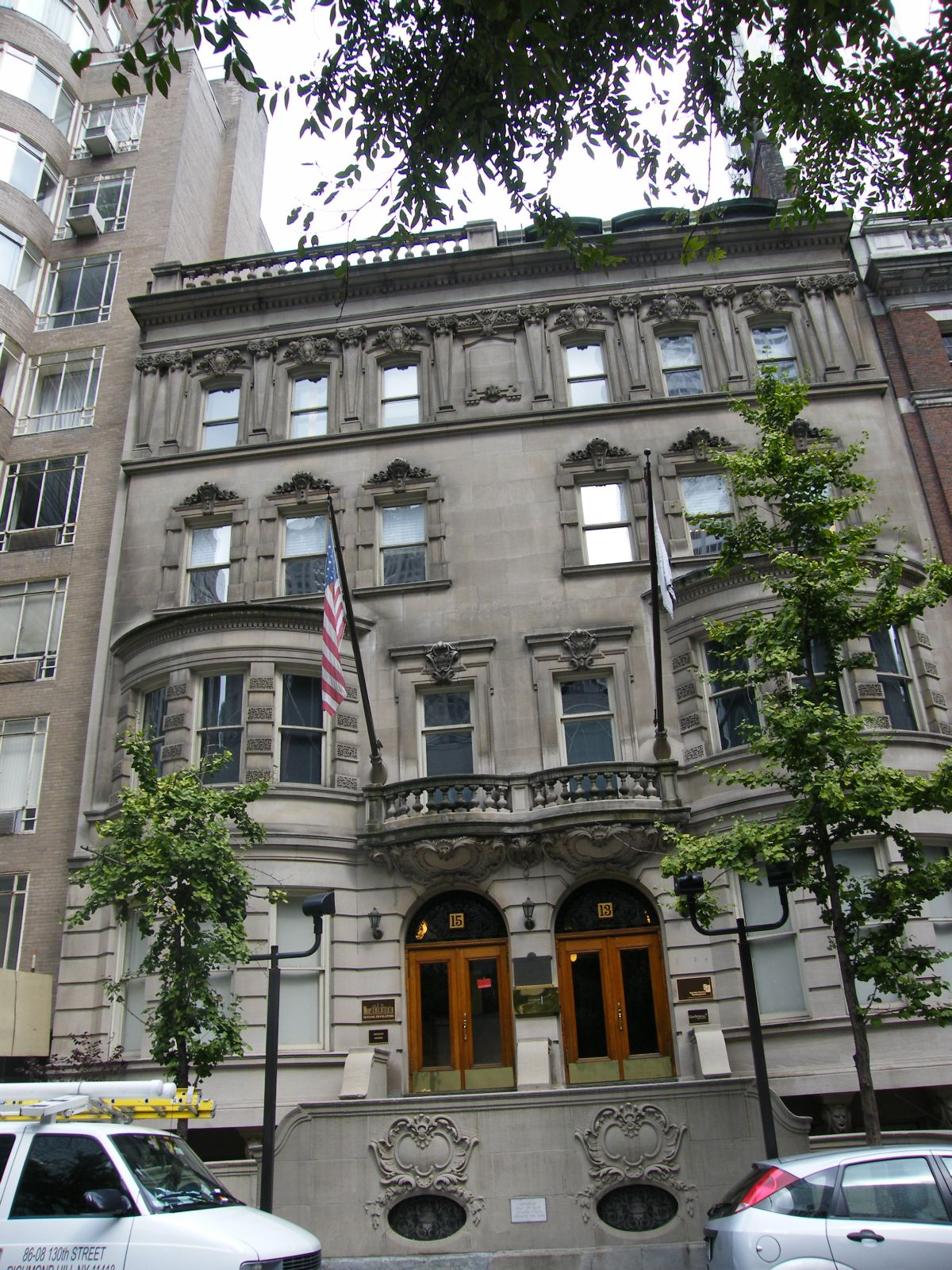
Seen in 2008

By late 1979, the Mendik Realty Company had acquired 13–15 West 54th Street, along with the rear properties at 20–22 West 55th Street. Though the Museum of Modern Art was occupying the houses while its own structure was being rebuilt, there were rumors that the four properties would be demolished to make way for an office building. The New York City Landmarks Preservation Commission designated the five houses at 5–15 West 54th Street as city landmarks, including 13 and 15 West 54th Street, on February 3, 1981. The Committee for the Preservation of West 54th and West 55th Streets had pushed for the landmark designation. At the time, the five houses were in various states of preservation: even as 13 and 15 West 54th Street had been proposed for demolition, the double house at 9–11 West 54th Street was being restored. The landmark designation made it harder for any of the houses to be demolished.

The developer Feldman Brothers took over the four properties at 13–15 West 54th .and 20–22 West 55th Street. In December 1981, Feldman Brothers announced plans to build a 32-story tower at 22 West 55th Street and convert 13 and 15 West 54th Street to office use. After objections from neighborhood residences, in 1983 the developers agreed to build a 13-story building instead. Danish bank Privatbanken bought the office building and leased the 54th Street houses in 1985 for close to $30 million, with an option to buy the houses. Under the arrangement, Feldman Brothers would complete the office building's construction and renovate the two houses, which were being refurbished by Haines Lundberg Waehler. The bank's name was installed in gold letters outside the houses. In 1986, Tore Wretman and Håkan Swahn announced they would open a Swedish restaurant, Restaurant Aquavit, in the lower two stories of number 13. Aquavit opened the next year. On January 4, 1990, the buildings were added to the National Register of Historic Places as part of the Residences at 5–15 West 54th Street historic district.

The next occupant of the houses, Danish bank Unibank, left several stories unused for several months on end before it moved out by 2000. Early in 2001, the Emmes Group of Companies paid $30 million for 13–15 West 54th and 20–22 West 55th Street. The company hired Helpern Architects to redesign the lobby of the office unit. After Aquavit's lease expired in 2004, it relocated from 13 to 15 West 54th Street to a nearby building on 65 East 55th Street. Both houses were sold in 2004 for $23 million to Rock 54, LLC. Gray Kunz subsequently opened the Grayz restaurant in the former Aquavit space in 2007. After two years, Grayz was replaced by Atria, which only operated for another four months. La Petite Maison then took the restaurant space in 2010. The Il Gattopardo restaurant opened in the townhouses' restaurant space in 2013. Eagle's View Capital Management leased the third floor of the houses in 2017.

== See also ==
- List of New York City Designated Landmarks in Manhattan from 14th to 59th Streets
- National Register of Historic Places listings in Manhattan from 14th to 59th Streets
