= Rhodes Preparatory School =

Defunct high school in New York, United States

Information
- Established: 1911
- Closed: 1988

Rhodes Preparatory School (1911–1988) was a private school New York City, United States, and initially located at 8-10-12-14 W 125th Street, Manhattan, New York City, United States, and located for much of its history at 11 West 54th Street. The school was named for John Cecil Rhodes. It included a lower school with students in seventh and eighth grades and an upper school for students from grades nine through twelve. For a brief period, it also had fifth and sixth grade classes. There was also an evening school for adults.

Rhodes was a college preparatory school. It attracted students from all over the world. Many graduates went on to Ivy League or Seven Sisters schools, and to other prestigious institutions around the country and the world. The now-defunct school is often referred to as "Rhodes School" or simply "Rhodes".

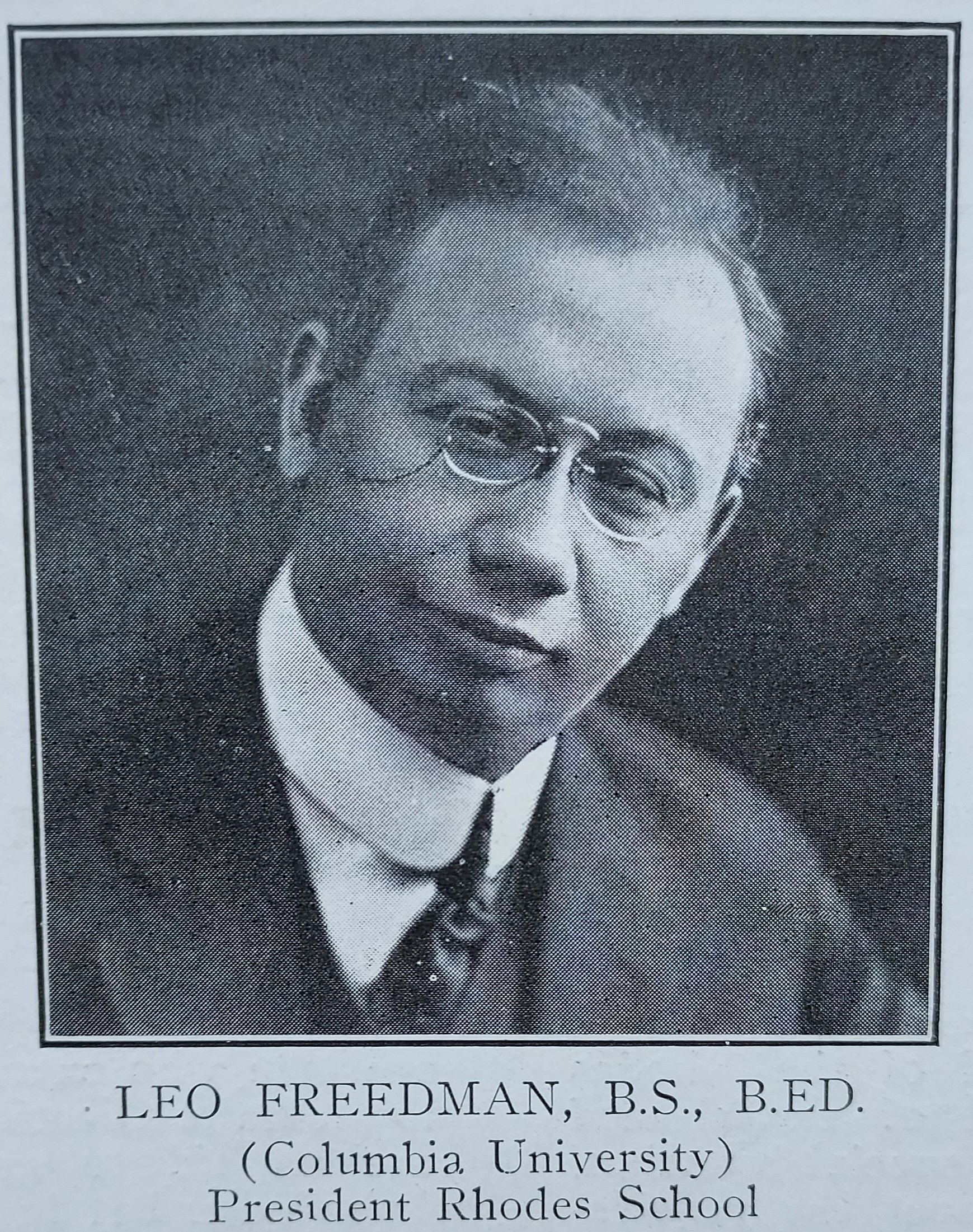
Leo Freedman, B.S. B.ED.

Signs in the classrooms read, "Every class is an English class."

The Warwick New York Hotel, located just a few doors down at 65 West 54th Street, hosted many school functions in its ballroom. Several Rhodes proms and commencement ceremonies were held at another New York hotel, the Waldorf Astoria.

Rhodes was the model for the school in the novel Catcher in the Rye by J.D. Salinger, the school of last resort for ne'er-do-wells who were kicked out of other private schools; e.g. Rick Jason (actor: Combat), who had been kicked out of nine other preparatory schools for outlandish behaviour.

== Timeline ==
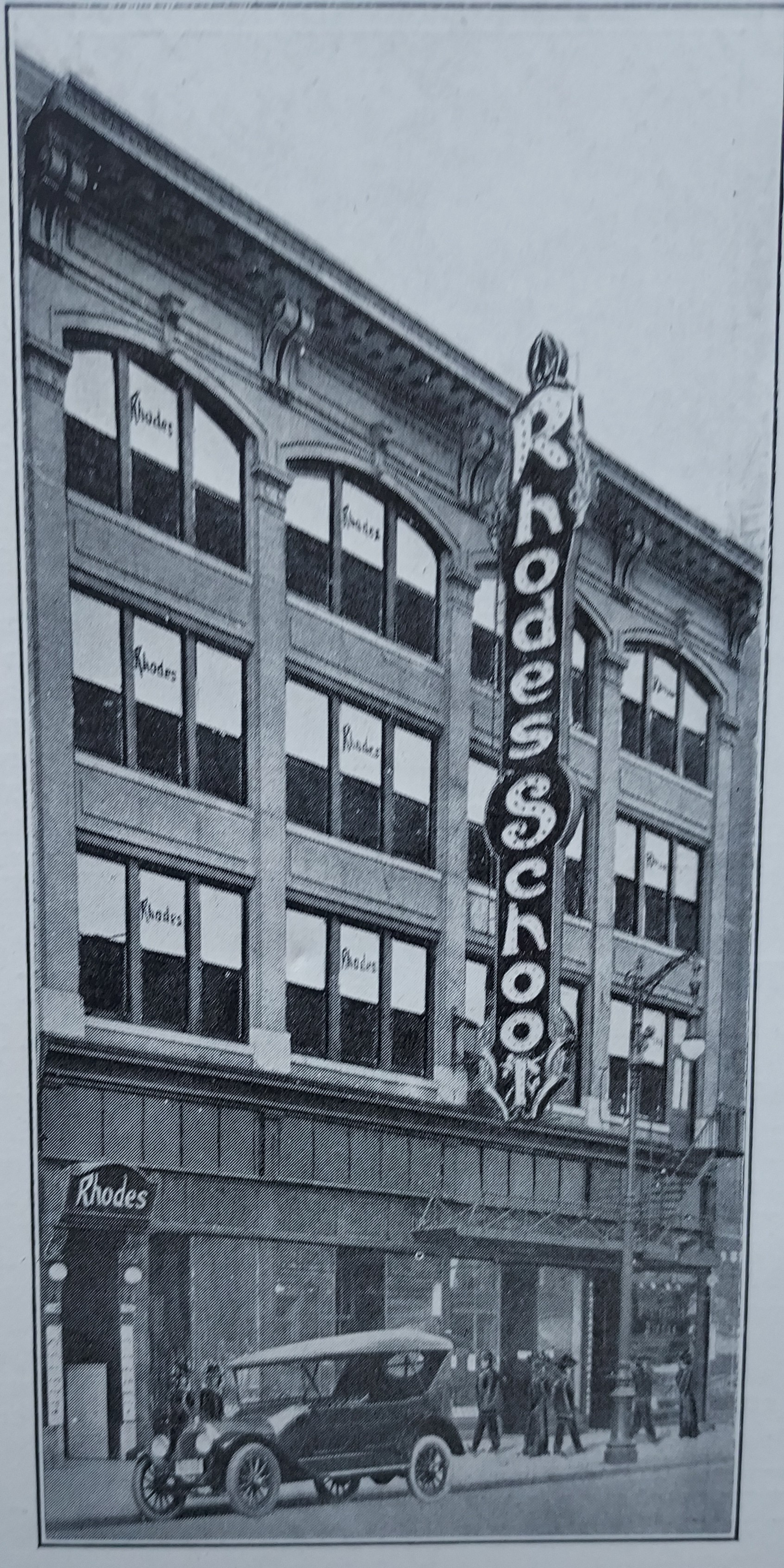
Initial Location at 8-10-12-14 W. 125th Street

- 1911 - Leo Freedman, B.S. B.Ed. (Columbia University) founds the school and is the first president
- 1924? - 1933 – banker David Merrall was President of the school
- By 1927, Leo Freedman has left the school and has founded the Beverly School for Boys in Los Angeles, CA.
- 1933-1966 J. Leslie White was President of the school
- 1938 – Relocates to 1041 6th Avenue (40th Street)

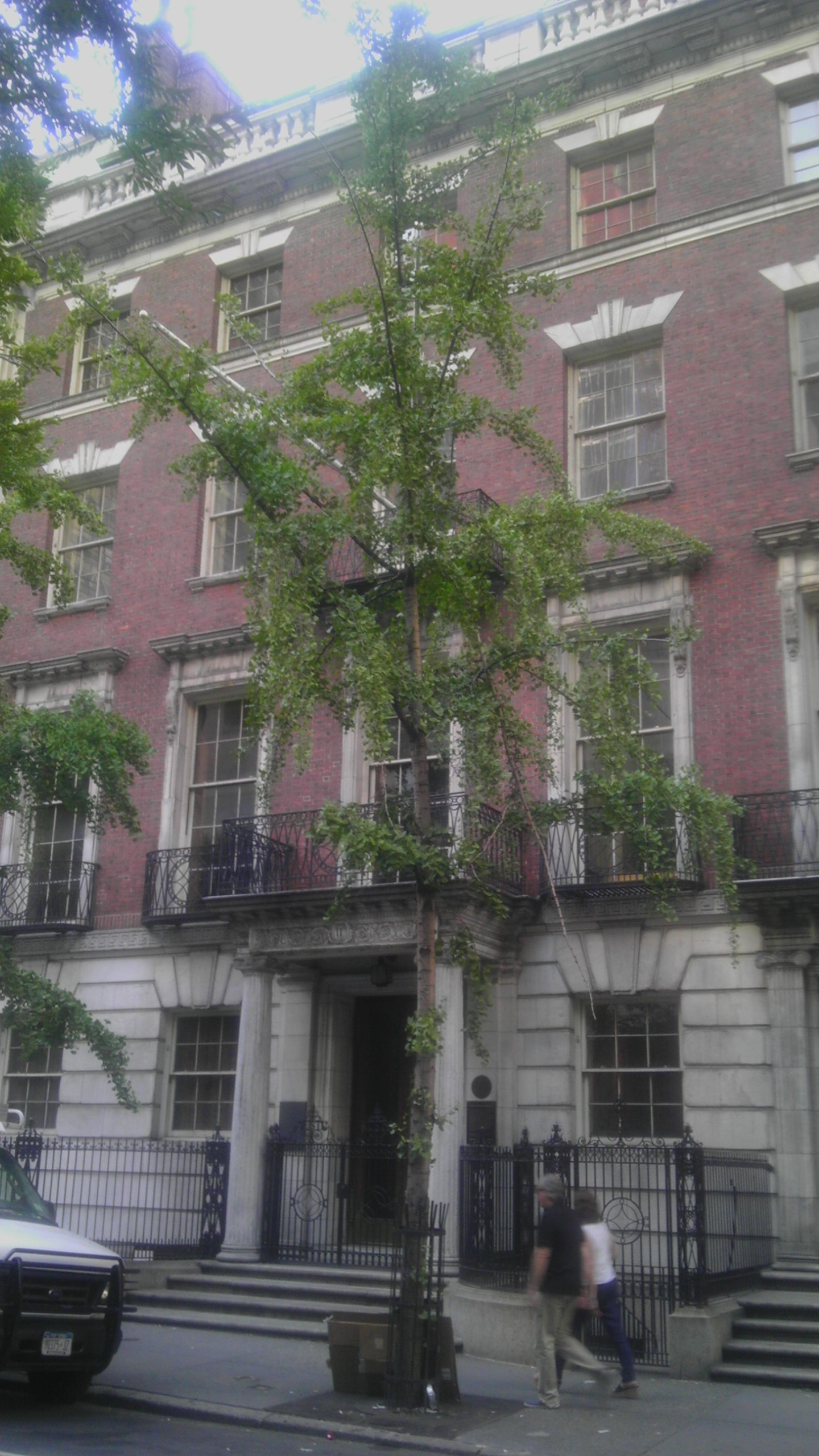
Former Rhodes school building at 11 West 54th Street

- 1945 – Relocates to 11 West 54th Street (5th – 6th Aves)
- 1959 – Dr. Robert Lowrance becomes headmaster, and William Kien becomes Director of Admissions
- 1974 – David Merrall dies; Seymour Merrall, his son, takes ownership
- 1979 – Relocates to Holy Trinity Roman Catholic School on West 83rd Street; US Trust Company buys West 54th Street building
- 1981 – 11 West 54th Street building is designated a New York City landmark
- June 1985 – Seymour Merrall sells Rhodes to Donald Nickerson, former headmaster of La Jolla Country Day School (California)
- August 1985 – Dr. Robert Lowrance dies
- 1988 – Sadly Rhodes shutters its doors
- July 21, 2001 – First Rhodes reunion, at TGI Friday's in Rockefeller Center
- July 26, 2003 – Second Rhodes reunion, at the Park Avenue Country Club (27th St. and Park Ave.)

== Former students ==
- Fiona Apple (Singer/ Songwriter)
- Alice Barrett-Mitchell (actress, TV's Another World)
- Ron Brown (former U.S. Commerce Secretary)
- James Caan (actor, The Godfather)
- Robert De Niro (actor, Taxi Driver)
- Thomas Glave (writer, academic, activist)
- Juan Pan Guerrero (Northern Mariana Islands politician)
- Stephen Adly Guirgis (playwright and actor)
- Charles N. Haas (Environmental Engineering Professor)
- Rick Jason (actor, TV's Combat!)
- Denise Nickerson (actress, TV's Dark Shadows, Willy Wonka & the Chocolate Factory)
- Kay Mazzo (ballet dancer and educator)
- Jane Olivor (singer)
- Ana Ortiz (actress, TV's Ugly Betty)
- Marc Rich (financier)
- Jane Stern (writer)
