= Frontage =

Area between a plot of land or building and the road

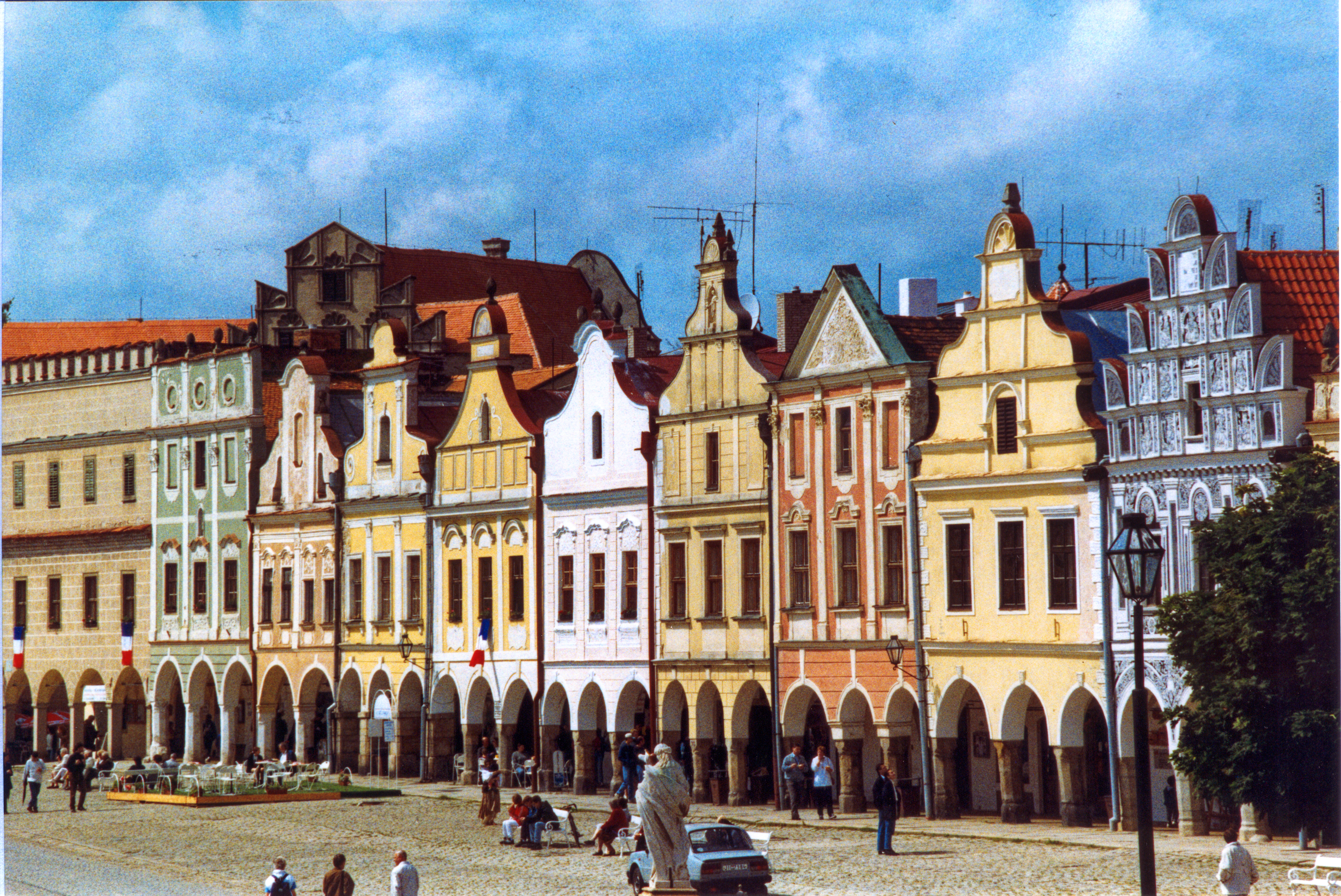
Renaissance frontages of houses on the square in Telč, Czech Republic

Frontage is the boundary between a plot of land or a building and the road onto which the plot or building fronts. Frontage may also refer to the full length of this boundary. This length is considered especially important for certain types of commercial and retail real estate, in applying zoning bylaws and property tax. In the case of contiguous buildings individual frontages are usually measured to the middle of any party wall.

In some parts of the United States, particularly New England and Montana, a frontage road is one which runs parallel to a major road or highway, and is intended primarily for local access to and egress from those properties which line it.

A "river frontage" or "ocean frontage" is the length of a plot of land that faces directly onto a river or ocean respectively. Consequently, the amount of such frontage may affect the value of the plot.

== See also ==
- Façade
