= John R. Platt =

American physicist (1918–1992)

John Rader Platt
- Born: 29 June 1918; Jacksonville, Florida, U.S.
- Died: 17 June 1992; Boston, Massachusetts, U.S.
- Education: Northwestern University (B.A., 1936); University of Michigan (Ph.D., 1941)
- Known for: Strong inference, philosophy of science, Club of Rome
- Notable work: "Strong Inference" (1964); The Step to Man (1966); Perception and Change (1970)
- Scientific career
- Fields: Physics, Biophysics, Philosophy of science
- Workplaces: University of Chicago; University of Michigan; Marine Biological Laboratory; Stanford Medical School; Harvard University; MIT; Hebrew University of Jerusalem; Salk Institute

For other people named John Platt, see John Platt.

John Rader Platt (June 29, 1918 – June 17, 1992) was an American physicist and biophysicist, professor at the University of Chicago, noted for his pioneering work on strong inference in the 1960s and his analysis of social science in the 1970s.

Platt was born in Jacksonville, Florida. He received a B.A. from Northwestern University in 1936, and a PhD in physics from the University of Michigan in 1941. From 1945 to 1965 he was assistant professor at the University of Chicago. In the 1940s he supervised the lab work of Benjamin Drake Wright. He also taught at the Marine Biological Laboratory and at Stanford Medical School.

From 1965 to 1977 he was professor of physics at the University of Michigan and associate director of the Mental Health Research Institute. He was also visiting professor at Harvard, M.I.T., the Hebrew University of Jerusalem and at the Salk Institute for Biological Studies.

His research interests since the 1940s were in the field of molecular biophysics and biophysics, and in the 1960s shifted to philosophy of science, vision and perception, and social trends . In the 1970s he participated in the Club of Rome. He died in Boston.

== Publications ==
=== Articles ===
- John R. Platt (1964). "Strong inference". Science. 146 (3642): 347–53. Bibcode:1964Sci...146..347P. doi:10.1126/science.146.3642.347. PMID 17739513.
- —— (1964). "Research and Development for Social Problems". Bulletin of the Atomic Scientists. 20 (6): 27–29. Bibcode:1964BuAtS..20f..27P. doi:10.1080/00963402.1964.11454675.
- —— (1966). "Diversity". Science. 154 (3753): 1132–1139. Bibcode:1966Sci...154.1132P. doi:10.1126/science.154.3753.1132. PMID 17780029.

=== Books ===
- 1962. The Excitement of Science. Houghton Mifflin. ASIN B002Z8HN6E
- 1966. The Step to Man. John Wiley & Sons. ISBN 978-0471691181
- 1970. Perception and Change: Projections for the Future ISBN 0472731009
- 1972. On Social Transformation.
