= Kazys Varnelis =

Kazys Varnelis may refer to:

- Kazys Varnelis (artist) (1917–2010), Lithuanian abstract painter who spent most of his adult life in the United States
- Kazys Varnelis (historian) (born 1967), American historian and theorist of architecture, specialising in network culture
