= Varnelis =

Varnelis is a Lithuanian surname. Notable people with the surname include:

- Antanas Varnelis (1971–1994), Lithuanian serial killer
- Kazys Varnelis (artist) (1917–2010), Lithuanian abstract painter
- Kazys Varnelis (historian) (born 1967), American historian

== See also ==
- Kostas Varnalis (1884–1974), Greek poet
