= The Peninsula New York =

Luxury hotel in Manhattan, New York

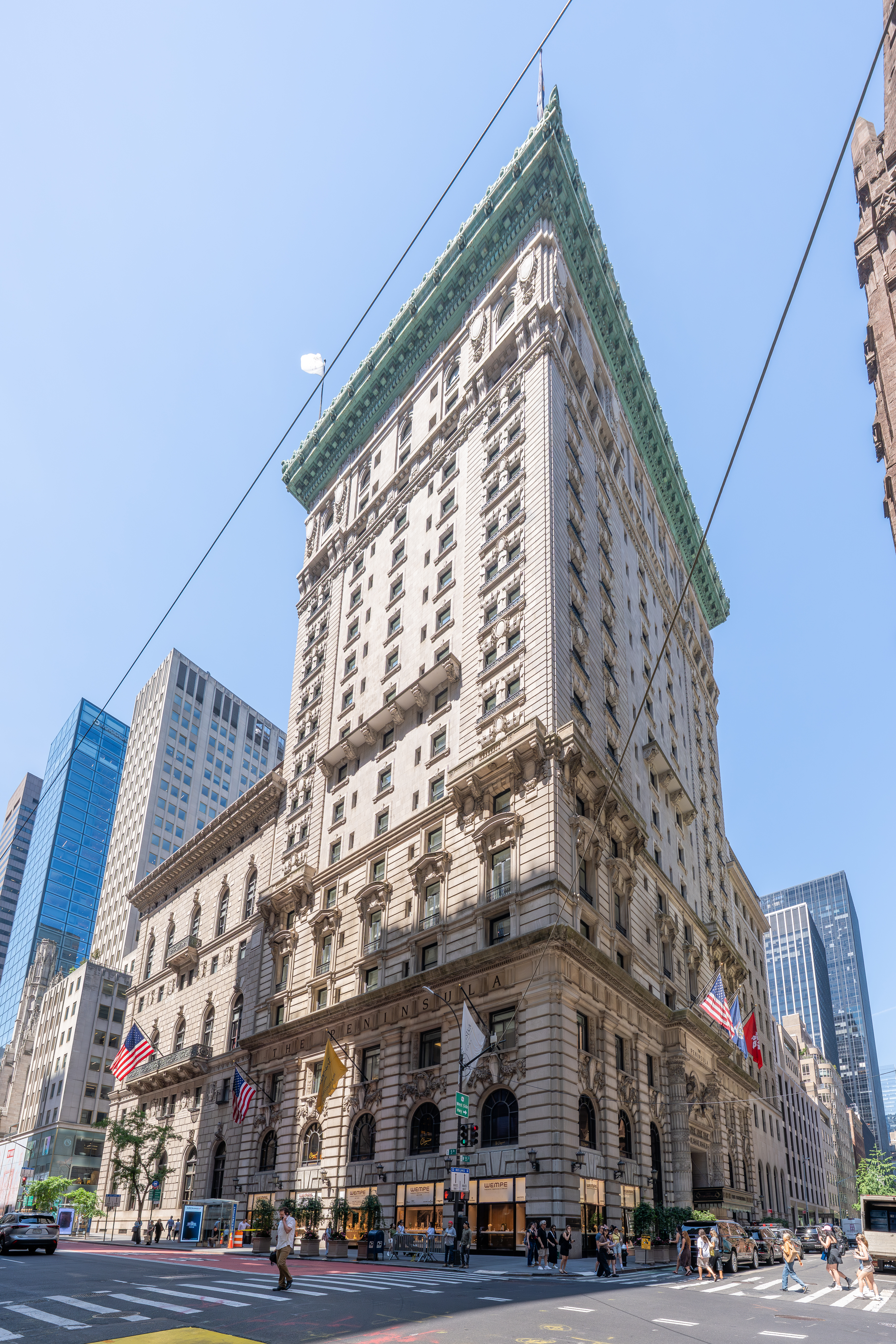
- Hotel 55th Street (2026)
- Former names: Gotham Hotel, Nova-Park Gotham, (Note: Although the hotel was known as the Nova Park Gotham from 1981 to 1986, it never operated under this name, as the hotel was closed for the entirety of that period.) Hotel Maxim's de Paris

General information
- Location: 700 Fifth Avenue; Manhattan, New York City
- Coordinates: 40°45′42″N 73°58′31″W
- Opened: 1905
- Renovated: 1981–1987
- Owner: The Hongkong and Shanghai Hotels, Limited
- Operator: The Peninsula Hotels

Technical details
- Floor count: 23

Design and construction
- Architect: Hiss and Weekes

Other information
- Number of units: 219
- Number of restaurants: 3 (+ 1 bar)

Website
- www.peninsula.com/new-york

New York City Landmark
- Designated: June 6, 1989
- Reference no.: 1697

The Peninsula New York is a luxury hotel at the corner of Fifth Avenue and 55th Street in the Midtown Manhattan neighborhood of New York City. Built in 1905 as the Gotham Hotel, the structure was designed by Hiss and Weekes in the neoclassical style. The hotel is part of the Peninsula Hotels group, which is owned by Hongkong and Shanghai Hotels (HSH). The structure is 23 stories high and, as of 2022, contains 241 rooms.

The facade, made of limestone and granite, was intended to complement the neighboring University Club of New York building. It is divided horizontally into a base, shaft, and capital. A three-story glass penthouse, completed in the 1980s to designs by Stephen B. Jacobs, rises above the original roof and contains the hotel's pool and fitness center. The lower stories contain two restaurants, a lobby, and various other rooms across multiple levels. The hotel originally had 400 guestrooms, although this was downsized in the 1980s to 250 rooms, including a multi-room presidential suite near the roof.

The 55th Street Company acquired the site in April 1902 and developed the Gotham Hotel, which opened on October 1, 1905. The hotel was sold in 1908 after several failed attempts to procure a liquor license, and it was resold several times over the next three decades. The Gotham was acquired in 1932 by the Metropolitan Life Insurance Company, which added ground-level storefronts in 1938 and continued to own the hotel until 1944. The Gotham was resold several more times in the 1950s and 1960s before Sol Goldman and Alex DiLorenzo acquired it in 1965. Rene Hatt leased the Gotham in 1979 and attempted to renovate it into the Hotel Nova-Park Gotham, but he gave up his lease in 1984 following several lawsuits and financial issues. A joint venture of several companies completed the renovation and reopened the hotel in November 1987 as the Hotel Maxim's de Paris, an outpost of Parisian restaurant Maxim's. HSH acquired the hotel's lease in 1989, renaming it the Peninsula New York, and renovated the hotel again in 1998.

== Site ==
The Peninsula New York is in the Midtown Manhattan neighborhood of New York City. It is on the southwest corner of Fifth Avenue to the east and 55th Street to the north. The land lot is rectangular and covers 12,552 ft^{2} (1,166.1 m^{2}), with a frontage of 100 ft (30 m) on Fifth Avenue and a depth of 125 ft (38 m) along 55th Street. To the west and south, the hotel is surrounded by the clubhouse of the University Club of New York. The site shares the block with 5, 7, 9–11, 13 and 15 West 54th Street; 46 West 55th Street; and the Rockefeller Apartments to the west. The hotel is also near the Museum of Modern Art to the south; Fifth Avenue Presbyterian Church and 712 Fifth Avenue to the north; 550 Madison Avenue to the northeast; the St. Regis New York hotel to the east; and 689 Fifth Avenue to the southeast.

== Architecture ==
The hotel was built in 1905 as the Gotham Hotel and was designed by Hiss and Weekes in the Italian Renaissance Revival style. The hotel building is shaped like a "C" and is arranged around a light court that faces the University Club building to the south.

=== Facade ===
The facade was made of limestone and granite to complement the neighboring University Club building. The facade is divided vertically into five bays on Fifth Avenue and six bays on 55th Street. Similar to other Beaux-Arts buildings, the facade is divided into three horizontal sections similar to the components of a column, namely a base, shaft, and capital. Despite its sturdy-looking appearance, the facade is actually a curtain wall hung from the building's steel superstructure. Originally, the hotel was 19 stories high and rose 254 ft (77 m) above the sidewalk. After a renovation in the 1980s, the hotel had 23 stories.

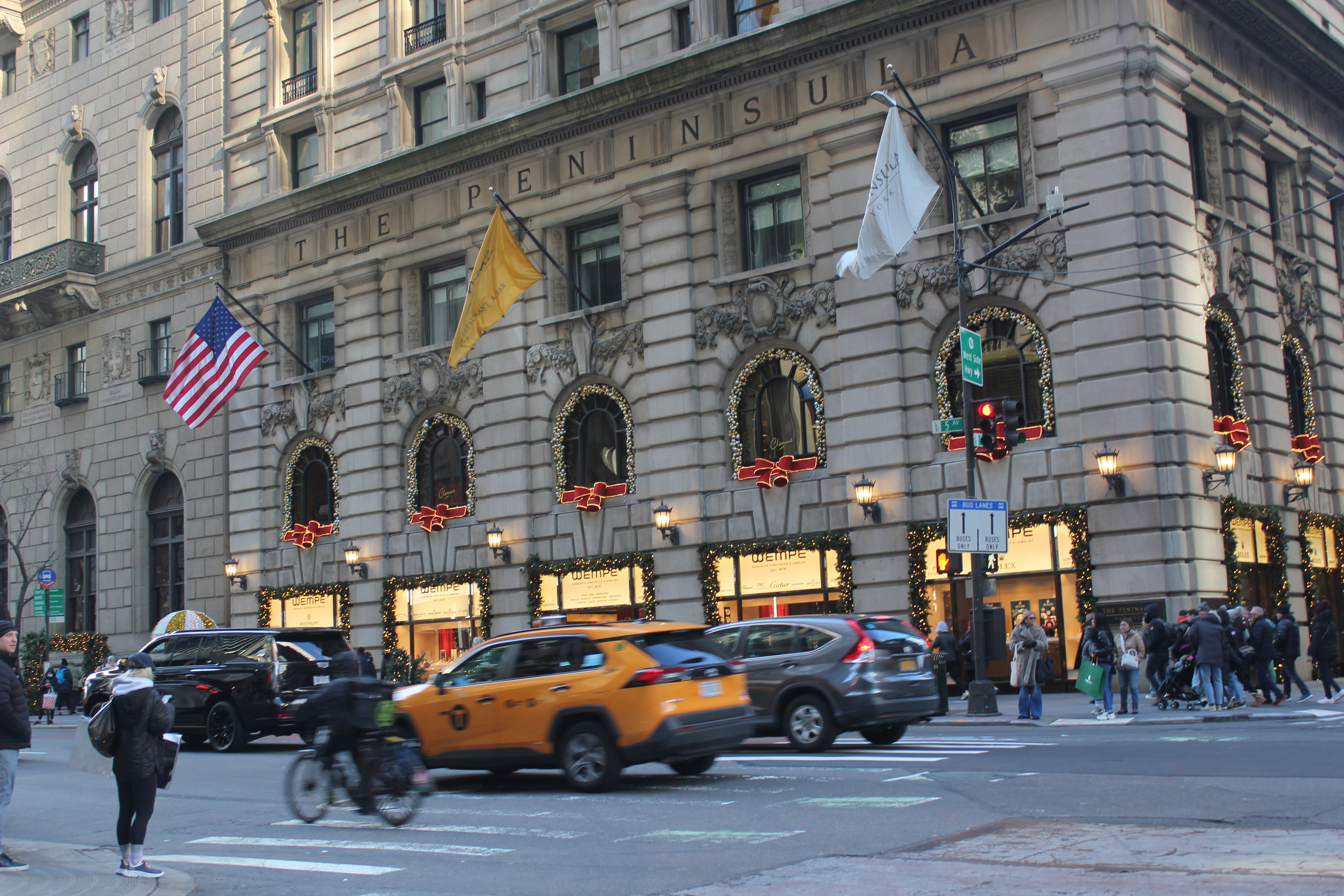
Stores at the base of the hotel

==== Base ====
The base of the hotel is three stories high; the first two stories were originally one double-height level. Along the base is a series of triple-height piers made of rusticated blocks, which in turn form an arcade that wraps around both Fifth Avenue and 55th Street. On Fifth Avenue and the easternmost part of the 55th Street elevation, the first story contains flat-arched openings, while the second story contains round arches. There was originally a balustrade facing Fifth Avenue, which was removed after 1908 when the avenue was widened. There are shields with festoons above the second-story windows. The third story contains rectangular windows that are recessed from the facade and contain carved soffits. The entablature above the third story was intended to be a continuation of the cornice above the University Club's first tier.

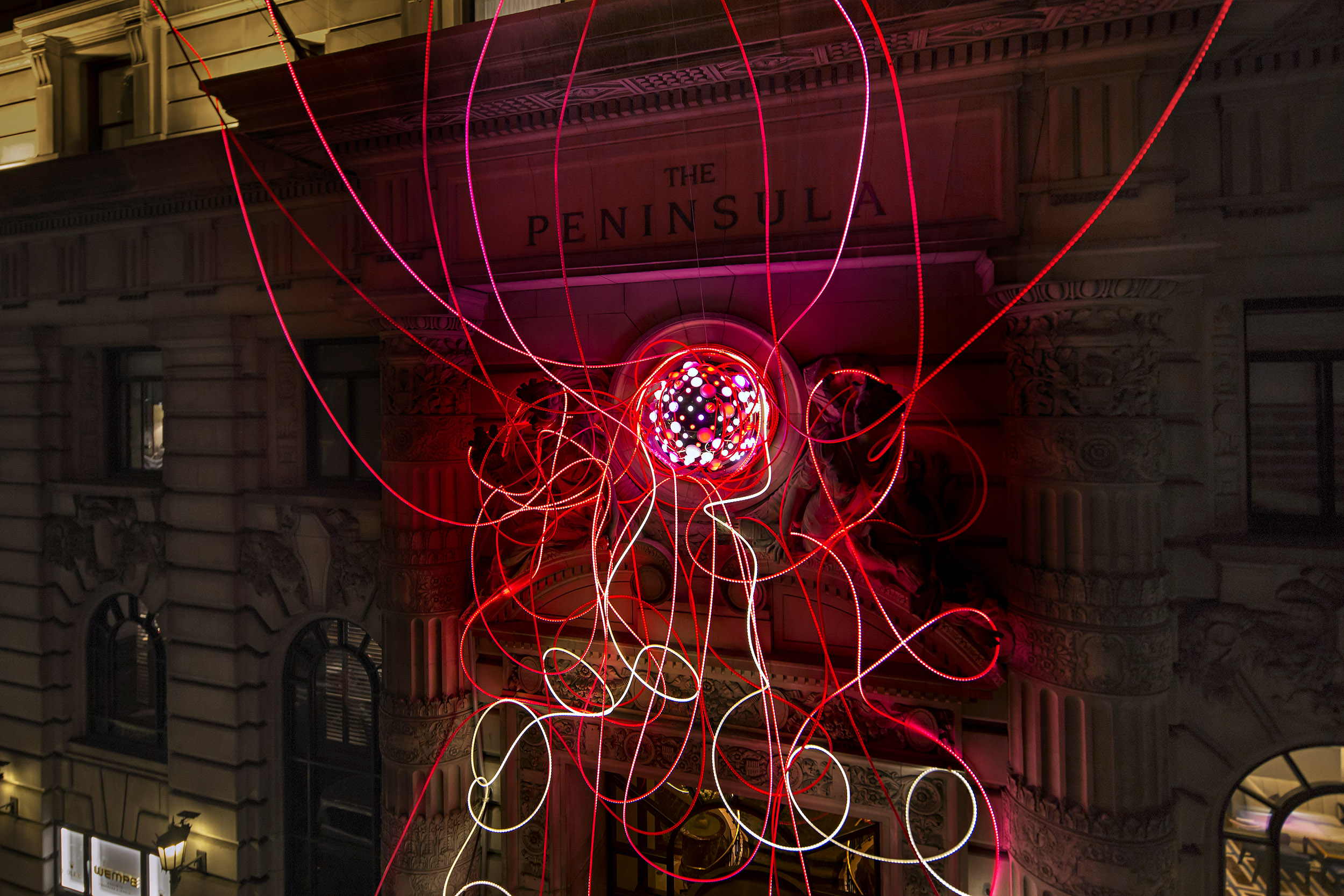
In October 2015, the main entrance above the doorway displayed a light sculpture installation by Grimanesa Amorós.

The hotel's main entrance is at the center of the 55th Street elevation and is placed within a rectangular opening. Above the doorway is a segmentally-arched broken pediment, which contains swags and a pair of sculptures on either side of a circular window. The sculptures depict the ancient goddesses Ceres and Diana. The doorway is flanked by large engaged columns in the Ionic order, placed atop pedestals. The columns are ornamented with vertical fluting and horizontal bands, and they support an entablature at the third floor. There are three bays of windows on either side of the 55th Street entrance. The two easternmost bays contain storefronts, while the other four bays contain double-height openings.

==== Upper stories ====
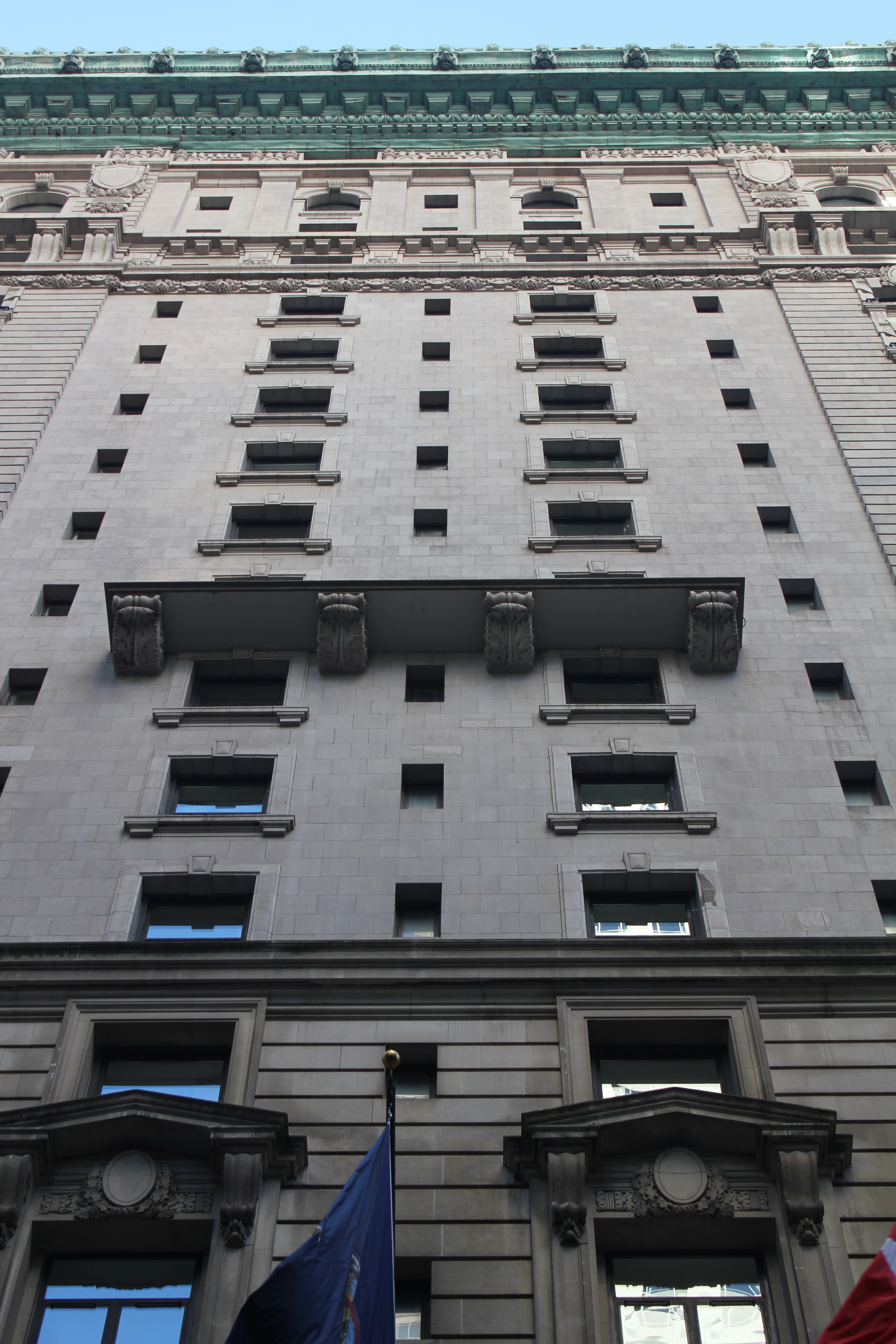
Upper stories as seen from 55th Street

Above the base, the hotel building's windows are all rectangular. The 4th to 6th stories are clad with rusticated blocks and are treated as a transitional story. There are small pilasters above each of the 4th-story windows, which carry an entablature above the 4th story. In addition, the 5th-story windows are surrounded by large frames and topped by either segmentally-arched or triangular pediments. The 6th-story windows generally have simple frames, except in the outermost bays, which have elaborate surrounds. There is a cornice above the 6th story, which is designed as a continuation of the cornice above the University Club's second tier.

On the 7th through 16th stories, only the outermost bays are rusticated, while the center bays contain a facade of smooth ashlar. The outermost sections of the Fifth Avenue and 55th Street elevations contain two windows per story on each corner. On both elevations, there are heavy scrolled brackets in front of the three center bays, which support a balcony. The balconies originally had iron balustrades and were intended to correspond with the University Club's cornice. Above the 15th story is a cornice with garlands, above which rises the capital. There are brackets and corbels at the 16th story, above which is a double-height arcade on the 17th and 18th stories. The arcade contains circular windows with wreaths, as well as shields with garlands; its design was meant to visually complement the arcade at the base. The entablature at the hotel's roof is made of copper.

The western and southern elevations are plain in design, with rectangular windows on a limestone-colored facade. The facade of the western elevation is rusticated above the 15th story, and the southwestern corner of the building contains a light court. The southern elevation contains a large light court at its center; at the 15th and 17th stories, horizontal braces cut across the light court. There is a copper entablature at the top of the southern elevation. A three-story glass penthouse, completed in the 1980s to designs by Stephen B. Jacobs, rises above the original roof. The penthouse, which consists of an angled framework, is not easily visible from street level.

=== Interior ===
The hotel was built with four elevators, which were clustered at the center of the building. There were also three staircases: one near the elevators, and an enclosed fire escape at the end of either wing. One of the fire escapes was intended for servants' use. Above the ground floor, the hotel was designed as a fireproof structure; the door frames and window frames were made of asbestos, and the doors themselves were made of wire glass. The hotel building also had fire alarms, which were relatively novel features when the Gotham opened in the 1900s. The Gotham also contained dumbwaiters, a pneumatic tube system, and a system of pipes for vacuum cleaning.

==== Basements and first story ====
The hotel had two basement levels. One of these basements contained the hotel's kitchen and commissary department, directly beneath the dining room. The basements contained a laundry room, a refrigeration plant, and a garbage-disposal machine. The garbage disposal was directly beneath the hotel's kitchen. Also in the basement was a bar, which was not open to the public at the time of the hotel's opening in 1905. This bar had a coffered ceiling and was designed in a Renaissance style. At the time of the hotel's opening, New York state law restricted bars that operated within 200 ft (61 m) of a church's entrance; this law was technically still in effect at the end of the 1990s, but a looser interpretation of the law allowed a bar to operate within the modern-day hotel. Access to the Peninsula New York's cocktail lounge involves traversing a flight of stairs and a narrow hallway, so the walking distance from the cocktail lounge to the Fifth Avenue Presbyterian Church was more than 200 feet.

The ground-floor public rooms were double-height spaces. The Gotham Hotel was not built with a public lobby. Instead, two revolving doors on 55th Street led to the foyer, a square space with Caen stone walls and columns, a brown-and-gold ceiling, and a bronze chandelier. To the right of the foyer was the hotel's office and the writing room, while to the left was an iron-and-glass partition that separated the foyer from the original dining room. The writing room was decorated in red, gold, and green and led to a telephone and telegraph room, as well as a stairway leading to a bar in the basement. Next to the writing room was a hallway, which had its own entrance on 55th Street and led to the original ballroom on the second floor. A square palm room connected the writing room with a dining room. The palm room had marble columns with Corinthian capitals; a leaded-glass skylight with green panels; and a bronze chandelier. By 2026, it had an artwork by Ricardo Mazal.

The dining room measured 40 by 100 ft (12 by 30 m) across, with a ceiling measuring 22 ft (6.7 m) high, and had seats for 400 people. Modeled after the Doge's Palace in Venice, it was decorated in green and red, with walnut wainscoting, as well as columns supporting a coffered ceiling. The dining room also had French doors leading to an outdoor terrace facing Fifth Avenue. The original furniture was designed in the Georgian style. Most of the original dining room was demolished in May 1938, when five storefronts were constructed along Fifth Avenue; the original office was converted to a new dining room at that time.

==== Second and third stories ====
As a result of the mid-20th-century modifications, the modern hotel's lobby is on the second floor, above the storefronts. The lobby was described as having a double stair and a chandelier hanging from a Renaissance-style ceiling. The Peninsula New York has a small lobby to discourage loitering. Because of the small size of the site, the lobby, lounges, and reception desk are on different levels. Following a 2024 renovation, the lobby was described as a double-height space with a grand staircase.

The second floor contained a women's parlor and a ballroom. The ballroom was a double-height space decorated in gray and gold, with a coved ceiling containing frescoes of various cupids. Following the hotel's 1980s renovation, the second floor contained a dining room with 76 seats, a bistro with 38 seats, and a cocktail lounge with 36 seats. The various parlors were designed in a Belle Époque style. During the 1990s, the Peninsula's restaurants were known as the Adrienne and Le Bistro and contained floral decorations. The restaurants were redecorated in beige and black in 1998. By the 2010s, the restaurant spaces were occupied by the Yabu Pushelberg-designed Clement Restaurant and Bar (named after Hongkong and Shanghai Hotels CEO Clement Kwok) and the Gotham Lounge, a piano bar. A triptych designed by Ricardo Mazal was mounted in the hotel in 2024.

The third floor was devoted to private dining rooms. The event spaces could fit meetings, weddings, dinners, and parties with up to 250 guests. By the 21st century, there were five function rooms with a combined floor area of 3,300 sq ft (310 m^{2}).

==== Guestrooms ====
Originally, the larger suites were placed on the exterior of the "C", facing the streets; the single rooms were placed on the interior and faced the light court. The hotel had 400 guestrooms at its opening, consisting of both single rooms and en-suite units. Each guestroom had its own bath. The original rooms included mahogany furniture and brass bed frames; white trim; and carpets and wallpaper in various colors. Every guestroom and suite had its own bathroom and closet. The dumbwaiters connected with butlers' pantries that were adjacent to each suite.

When the hotel was renovated in the 1980s, it was supposed to contain 255 units, including 109 rooms with single and double beds, as well as 145 larger suites. The hotel also contained a presidential suite measuring 3,230 ft^{2} (300 m^{2}) with a kitchen, study, conference room, and a room for security staff. By the late 1980s, the Peninsula New York contained 250 units, including the presidential suite and 30 additional suites. The presidential suite was known as the Peninsula Suite after a renovation in the early 2010s. As of 2024, the hotel has 219 units. While each guestroom is at least 370 square feet (34 m^{2}), the largest units (known as the deluxe suites) are on the 16th to 20th floors and cover 1,050 square feet (98 m^{2}).

The rooms were renovated in the 1980s with burgundy, gold, and black decorations, as well as purple bathtubs beside the beds. These were removed in 1986 before the hotel reopened as the Maxim's de Paris. The Maxim's bathrooms were clad in travertine, while the bedrooms contained wood-cherry paneling with ebony inlays. When the hotel became the Peninsula New York, the rooms were redecorated in the Art Nouveau style. During a 1998 renovation, the rooms were further modified to include electronic control panels near each bed; a desk for computers and telephones; and larger, wheelchair-accessible bathrooms. In addition, the hotel was redecorated in a gold, cream, and black color scheme, with paintings by Robert Motherwell and Helen Frankenthaler. The guestrooms were redecorated in a beige, gold, and grayscale palette in 2024, after which there were 219 units. The rooms have technology such as built-in TVs and large tubs in the bathrooms, as well as touchscreen tablets for guest services.

==== Fitness center ====
The fitness center at the hotel is located on the 22nd floor. The pool is in a glass-enclosed room; during the summer, a sundeck is available. The hotel's spa spans 35,000 sq ft (3,300 m^{2}) over three floors. The spa contains 12 treatment rooms, a steam room, and an Asian lounge among other features. The hotel's pool, measuring 42 feet (13 m) long and ranging from 3.5 to 5.5 feet (1.1 to 1.7 m) deep, was installed in the early 1980s and originally contained a wave-making machine. In the 1990s, children could use the hotel's pool during the morning and early afternoon, but the pool and other fitness facilities were restricted to adults during other times. The spa also hosts various health and wellness classes.

The health club also contained a running track and juice bar. By 2000, the hotel employed trainers who, for a fee, could accompany guests who wished to jog in the nearby Central Park. After the hotel was acquired by the Peninsula chain, the roof included a terrace called the Pen-Top Lounge. The original Pen-Top was closed in 2008 and replaced with Salon de Ning, which itself was renamed the Pen-Top following the 2024 renovation. The renovated Pen-Top Lounge has a retractable roof canopy with louvers.

== History ==
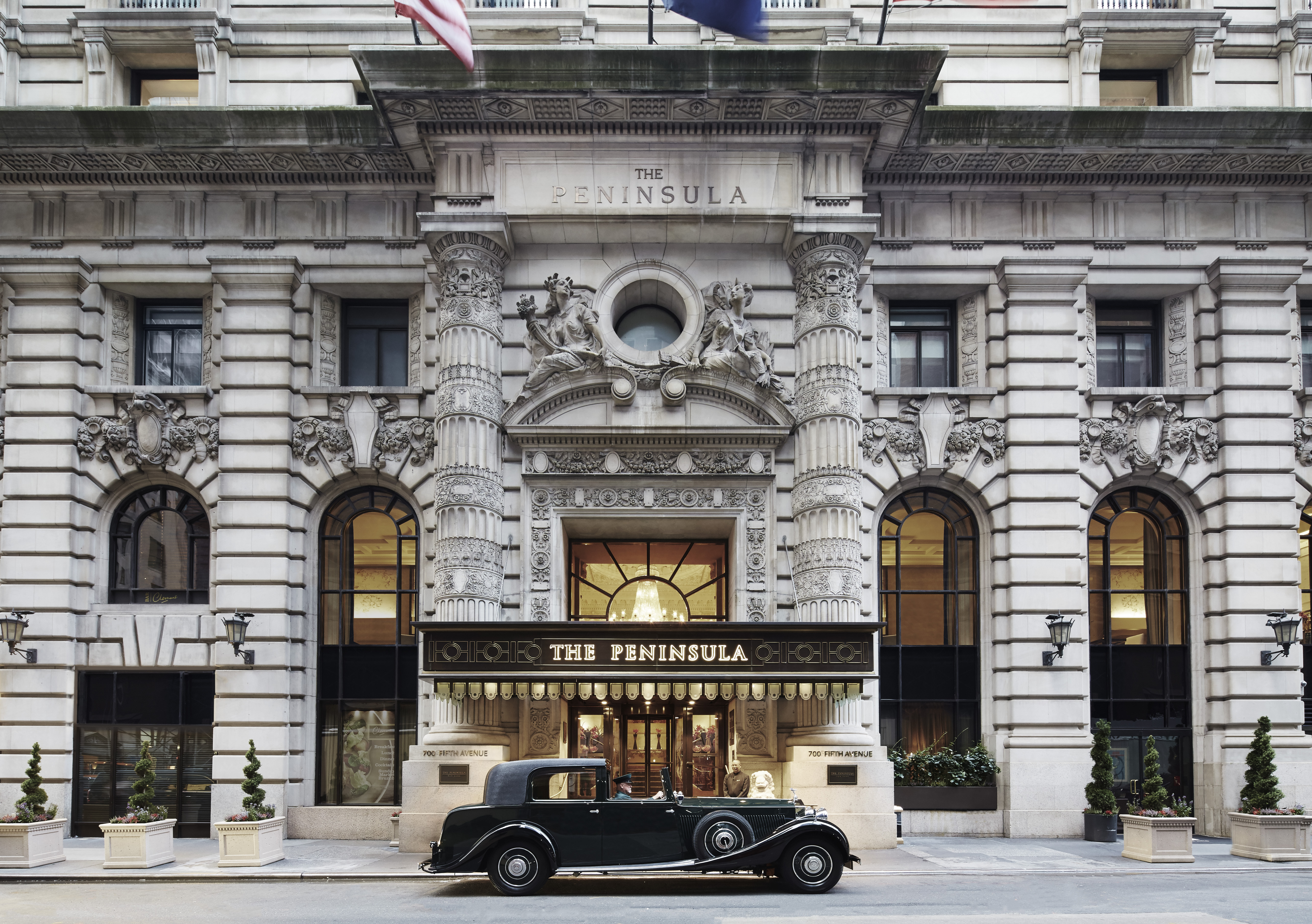
Hotel entrance

Fifth Avenue between 42nd Street and Central Park South (59th Street) was relatively undeveloped through the late 19th century, and many row houses were developed on the avenue. By the early 1900s, that section of Fifth Avenue was becoming a commercial area. The southwest corner of Fifth Avenue and 55th Street was part of the old campus of St. Luke's Hospital, which had moved to Morningside Heights, Manhattan, in 1893. The southern part of the St. Luke's site became the University Club's clubhouse, completed in 1900.

=== Development ===
The site at the southwest corner of Fifth Avenue and 55th Street was sold twice in 1901. The first time it was sold, the seller received $575,000. Jeremiah C. Lyons resold the building in September 1901, when a syndicate of investors bought it for $700,000. The buyers, Henry L. Goodwin and Henry R. Hoyt, resold the property in April 1902 to the newly formed 55th Street Company, of which Goodwin was a chief executive. The 55th Street Company announced that it would develop a 18-story hotel on the site. The building would be designed by Hiss and Weekes and constructed by the General Building and Construction Company at a cost of $3.5 million. It was one of four large sites on Fifth Avenue between 42nd and 59th Streets to be sold for development during the preceding six months. Hiss and Weekes filed plans for the site at the end of June 1902.

U.S. senator Mark Hanna of Ohio, along with the philanthropist Thomas Fortune Ryan, were major investors in the project, and U.S. senator Thomas C. Platt also provided funding for the Gotham. Frank V. Bennett, operator of the Arlington Hotel in Washington, D.C., leased the hotel for 20 years in August 1903; the lease was not officially recorded until May 1905, by which time the hostelry was known as the Gotham Hotel. Hanna had been one of Bennett's close friends in Washington, D.C., and had helped introduce Bennett to the Gotham Hotel's other developers. Even after Hanna's death in 1905, his estate was one of the Gotham Hotel's biggest shareholders. The hotel's construction was delayed significantly because of strikes, which increased the construction cost by $250,000. The facade and roof were completed in early 1904, and, as late as March 1905, the hotel was planned to open the following month.

John Jacob Astor IV, who was simultaneously developing the St. Regis Hotel across Fifth Avenue, had attempted to obtain a liquor license for his hotels, despite high opposition from local residents. At the time, New York state law required that any establishment with a liquor license was required to gain the approval of the owners of two-thirds of all private property within 200 ft (61 m), and was required to be at least 200 feet from any church. The Fifth Avenue Presbyterian Church, which was within 200 feet of both the St. Regis and the Gotham, objected to the liquor license. Although the St. Regis eventually secured a liquor license by moving its entrance, the Gotham had no such recourse, as it was much closer to the Fifth Avenue Presbyterian Church. (Note: The St. Regis is diagonally across the intersection of Fifth Avenue and 55th Street from the Fifth Avenue Presbyterian Church, whereas the Gotham is directly across 55th Street. Fifth Avenue is 100 ft (30 m) wide, and 55th Street is 30 ft (9.1 m) wide, so the St. Regis is approximately 104 ft (32 m) from the church.) In May 1905, the Gotham's operators petitioned the New York State Legislature to change the state's liquor laws so that hotels with more than 200 rooms were exempt from the 200-foot restriction. Governor Frank W. Higgins vetoed the bill in June 1905, so the Gotham was forced to open without a liquor license. The hotel did originally have an enclosed dining terrace overlooking Fifth Avenue.

=== Opening and foreclosure ===
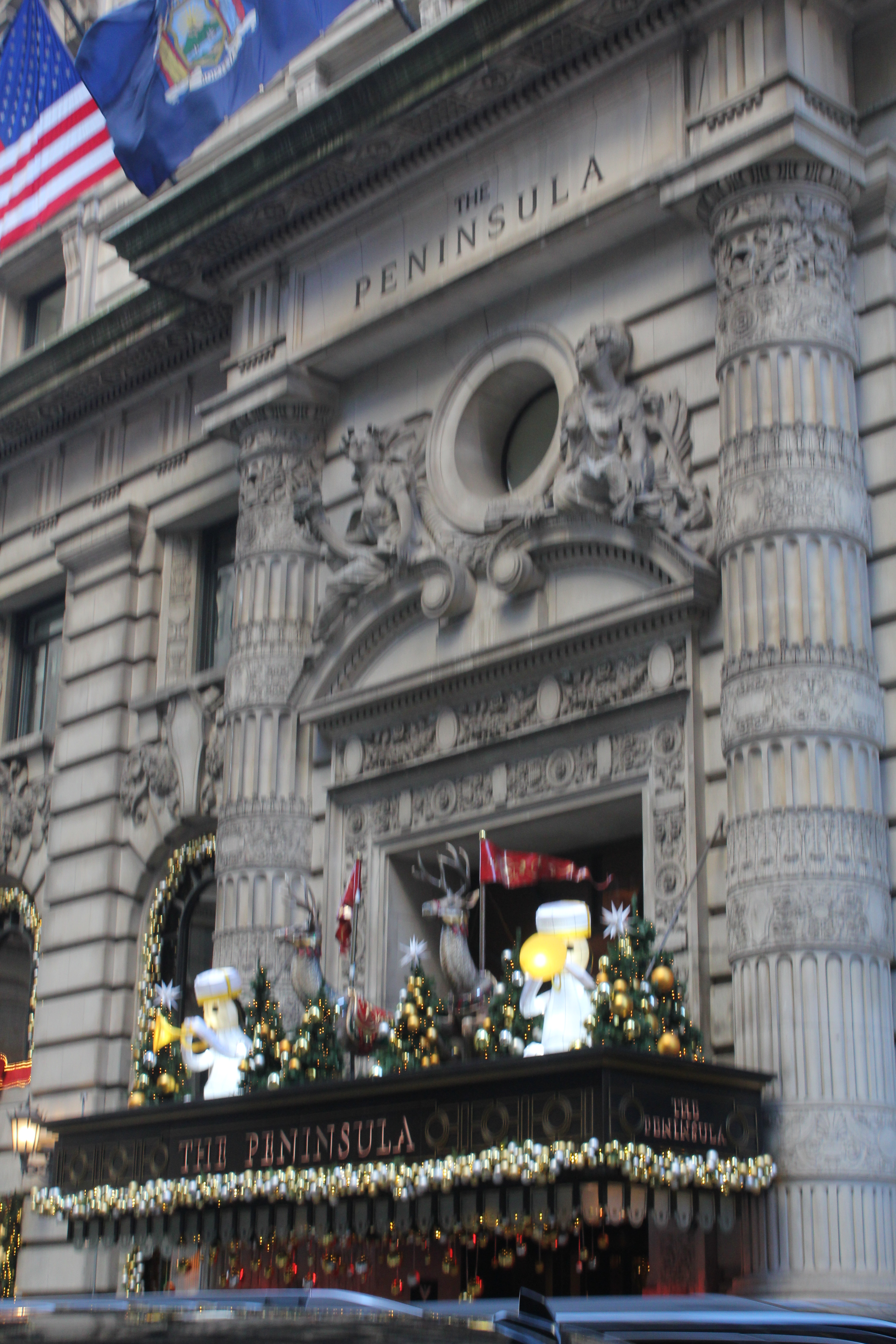
Detail of entrance

The hotel opened on October 1, 1905; its first guest was Senator Hanna's widow. Originally, the Gotham operated as an apartment hotel, and most of the units had already been leased to long-term residents, including all the units on Fifth Avenue. Other early residents included Platt and financier James J. Hill. In addition, because the Gotham did not have a liquor license, it hired some employees specifically to obtain alcoholic beverages from nearby establishments. By April 1906, the 55th Street Company was negotiating to sell the hotel for $3 million. Meanwhile, in 1906, New York state legislators attempted once more to amend state law so the Gotham could obtain a liquor license without the Fifth Avenue Presbyterian Church's consent. Governor Higgins let the bill expire, so the bill was introduced again in early 1907. The state legislature passed the bill in May 1907, only for governor Charles Evans Hughes to veto the bill.

Bennett only operated the hotel for two years, and he sold his lease in October 1907 to restaurateur Carl Berger. The Hotel Gotham Company, which operated the hotel, surrendered it to the 55th Street Company in December 1907 due to non-payment of rent. Berger angrily quit as the hotel's manager on July 1, 1908, when Luke M. Boomer, Harry Merry, and E. R. Grabow took over the hotel. Two days later, Gilbert H. Montague was appointed as the hotel's receiver, despite Henry Goodwin's claim that the receiver had no rights to the hotel's operation. William R. Wood and Charles L. Weatherbee leased the Gotham Hotel in August 1908 and appointed Frederick V. Weishart as the manager. At the time, the hotel had never made a profit. Bennett fatally shot himself at his Gotham Hotel apartment in September 1908.

By late 1908, the hotel was unable to pay off relatively small debts such as a butcher's $741 bill. A foreclosure auction was scheduled for the hotel in October 1908 after the Knickerbocker Trust Company foreclosed on a $500,000 mortgage. The Gotham was overshadowed by more luxurious hotels, like the St. Regis across the street and the Plaza Hotel a few blocks north, but the Real Estate Record and Guide reported that the foreclosure was solely because of the liquor bill. Benjamin P. Cheney bought the hotel for about $2.5 million the same month, beating out two other bidders. The sale did not affect Wood and Weatherbee's management of the hotel; the men paid $175,000 a year. Yet another bill to allow the hotel to obtain a liquor license was proposed in 1909, but the bill failed, as did another in 1911. The new owner, meanwhile, planned to convert the Gotham into a transient hotel and renovate the dining terrace into a Japanese restaurant. However, the Gotham's terrace restaurant was demolished after Fifth Avenue was widened in 1911, since the terrace protruded 14 ft (4.3 m) into the street.

=== Mid-20th century ===
==== 1910s to 1930s ====
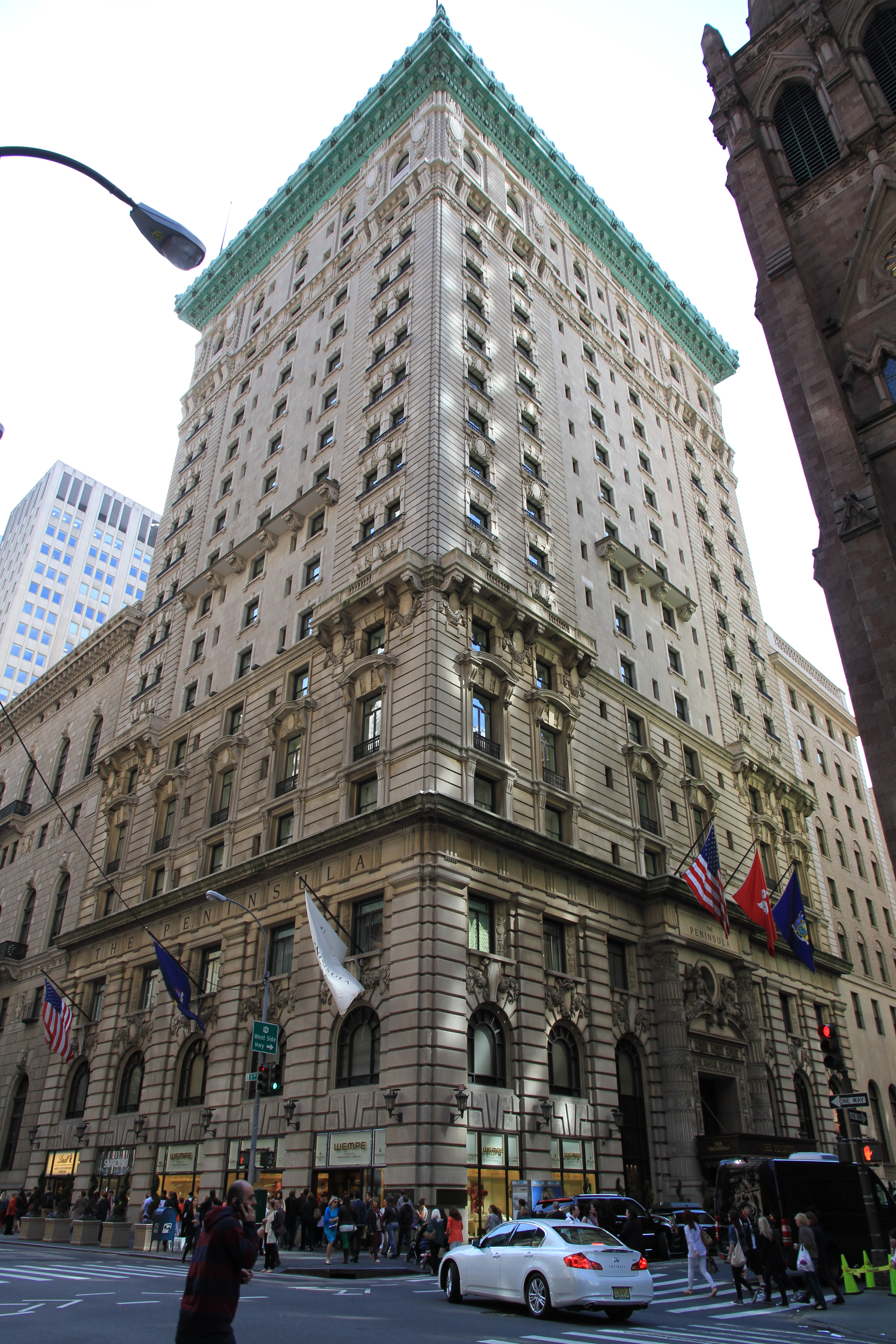
Seen from across Fifth Avenue and 55th Street

Among the Gotham's guests in the early 20th century were composer Victor Herbert, as well as pianist Ignacy Jan Paderewski, who lived there for sixteen years. In December 1914, Franklin Pettit bought the hotel from Cheney for nearly $3.5 million. Weatherbee and Wood continued to operate the hotel, even after the Hotel Holdings Company sold the Gotham to William and Julius Manger of Manger Hotels in October 1920. The next month, the 2 West 55th Street Corporation took title to the hotel on behalf of the Manger brothers. The brothers attempted to sell the Gotham for $5 million in early 1925, but they did not receive any offers that they deemed acceptable. The Manger brothers eventually bought out Weatherbee and Wood's lease in 1927.

By 1931, the Gotham was one of the few remaining buildings on Fifth Avenue in Midtown Manhattan that still did not have shops. The Metropolitan Life Insurance Company moved to foreclose on a $2 million mortgage that it held on the hotel in March 1932. Leon Leighton and Raymond J. Scully were appointed as receivers. The next month, the American Hotels Corporation took over the Gotham's lease and appointed G. H. Wartman as the manager. The Metropolitan Life took over the hotel in July 1932. The hotel's managers added an airplane departure board in the lobby in 1933, which they claimed was the first such board in a hotel lobby, and they also installed a marine room at the Gotham to complement the hotel's rooftop "sun deck". The hotel was also the site of a notable suicide in 1938, when 26-year-old John William Warde jumped from the 17th floor in front of 10,000 spectators; the incident inspired the 1951 film Fourteen Hours.

Architect D. Everett Waid designed five storefronts at ground level in 1938; the bronze-and-glass storefronts were recessed from the facade. As part of this project, the original dining room on Fifth Avenue was closed and demolished in May 1938, and a new dining room was built within the hotel offices on the opposite side of the lobby. The hotel's offices were then relocated to the space previously occupied by the second-floor ballroom. The original ceiling, designed by Hiss and Weekes, was preserved as part of the project. In addition, space for exhibitions was created on the second floor. The storefronts were leased to such tenants as jeweler Charlton & Co. and the Grand Central Art Galleries. The renovations coincided with the beginning of the 1939 New York World's Fair. At the beginning of April 1939, a syndicate of Chicago investors, led by Arnold S. Kirkeby, leased the hotel for five years.

==== 1940s to 1970s ====
In 1944, a syndicate headed by Kirkeby bought the hotel from Metropolitan Life. At the time, the hotel had 358 rooms and was valued at $2.25 million. A cocktail lounge was added to the hotel during this decade. Kirkeby's syndicate, the National Cuba Hotel Corporation, sold the Gotham in May 1955 to a syndicate composed of Webb and Knapp and Roger L. Stevens. That November, Webb & Knapp and Stevens sold the Gotham and the Beverly Wilshire Hotel to an investor for a combined $11 million. The Kirkeby Hotel Corporation retained its lease of the Gotham Hotel. The Hotel Investors Syndicate, led by Peter J. Sharp, acquired the Gotham, Beverly Wilshire, and Saranac Inn in May 1957. Subsequently, Sharp Ltd. Hotels operated the Gotham, and it renovated the hotel.

Webb and Knapp agreed in August 1961 to repurchase the Gotham, Stanhope, and Beverly Wilshire hotels from Evelyn Sharp, Peter Sharp's mother. At the time, the Gotham contained 400 rooms and 18-hour maid service. Webb and Knapp completed its acquisition in October 1961 and immediately began contracting to sell the hotel, while continuing to operate it, as part of a leaseback agreement. A syndicate led by Alvin Greenstein bought the hotel in December 1961 and leased it back to Webb and Knapp for 21 years, with sixteen renewal options. Under the terms of the lease, the hotel had to remain in operation until at least 1971, but Webb and Knapp could demolish the hotel afterward. In 1963, Neal Lang was appointed as the hotel's general manager. Webb and Knapp had lent $2 million toward a $3.568 million mortgage loan that had been placed on the hotel (with the Dry Dock Savings Bank holding the remaining stake), but the firm sold that stake in 1964.

Wellington Associates, a joint venture of Sol Goldman and Alexander DiLorenzo, bought the Gotham in March 1965. Wellington appointed Frank C. Bromber as the Gotham's executive director. The new owners redecorated and repainted the main lobby and dining room, and they cleaned and illuminated the facade. Wellington also bought two buildings at 23 and 25 West 55th Street and converted these structures into a parking garage. The 18-story, 300-space parking garage opened in 1966 and was reportedly the first parking garage in New York City to be added to an existing hotel. Prior to the garage's completion, guests had used various garages between Second and Ninth avenues; however, about 90 percent of short-term guests did not bring their cars to the hotel. Goldman said in 1967 that both the Gotham and the St. Regis (which he also owned) were profitable. By the next year, the Gotham's renovation had been completed at a cost of $1.5 million.

The Gotham's main dining room and banquet department were closed in July 1970; the dining room reopened in March 1971 but only served meals on weekdays. The hotel also continued to lease space to commercial tenants, including shipping company Italian Line and shoe store Charles Jourdan. Goldman began experiencing financial issues after DiLorenzo died in 1975, but he continued to own the Gotham. Goldman and the heirs of DiLorenzo's estate eventually agreed to split up Wellington's holdings; as part of this process, Goldman retained ownership of the Gotham.

=== 1980s renovation ===
==== Nova-Park attempt ====
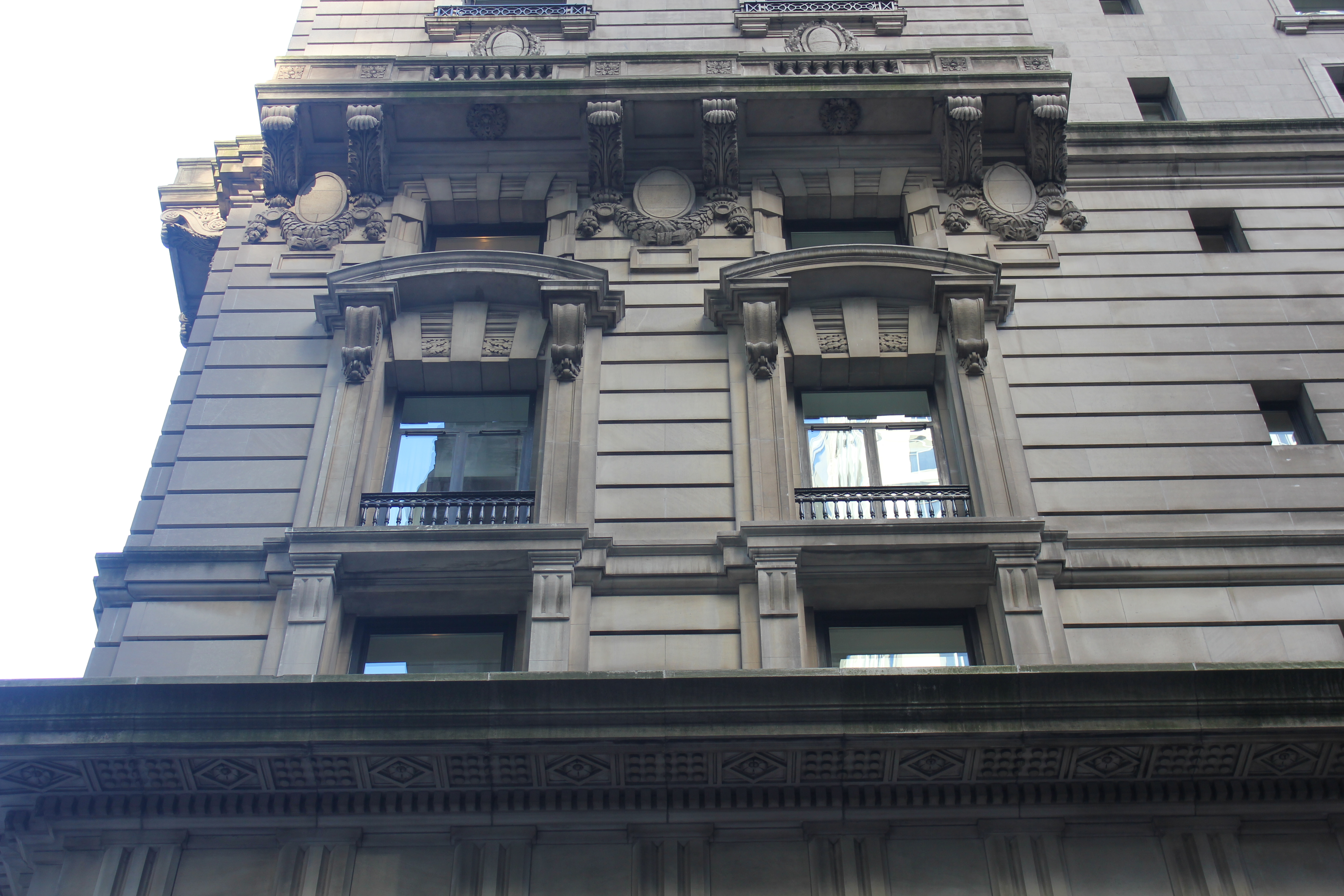
Window details

Swiss hotel owner Rene Hatt signed a lease for the hotel in 1979, paying $3.5 million in annual rent for the first 20 years. The Gotham was closed for renovations in 1981, and Hatt intended to reopen it as the Hotel Nova-Park Gotham, a larger version of the Hotel Nova-Park Élysées in Paris. He planned to operate the Gotham as an ultra-luxury hotel, charging up to $1,750 per night. Hatt hired Stephen Jacobs to design the renovation, which included rehabilitating the interior and reducing the 330-room hotel to 250 rooms. This renovation added the hotel's rooftop pool and fitness center. The Nova-Park Gotham was expected to include multiple restaurants and bars, a nightclub, various meeting rooms, and a business center. This was one of several hotel projects being developed in New York City in the 1980s, which collectively added 3,500 rooms. A group of European banks led by German bank Deutsche Anlagen lent $38 million for the project.

When the project started in 1981, the Gotham was scheduled to be closed for two years. The hotel's reopening was scheduled for October 1983, then to February 1984. The project had stalled by early 1984 after Nova-Park AG had invested $120 million on the project, which had originally been budgeted at $30 million. Real-estate experts estimated that the developers needed another $40 million to complete the renovation, but Nova-Park AG had not even paid rent for several months, and they owed $5 million in taxes. Hatt had taken out $23 million worth of additional mortgages without the consent of his first-mortgage lenders. The per-room cost of renovating the Gotham surpassed the cost of brand-new luxury hotels in New York City, which typically cost $180,000 to $200,000 per room. One observer attributed the cost overruns to the "design-as-you-go" nature of the project, saying that Hatt had "unrealistic" expectations about the quality of the work. In several cases, Hatt had ordered that a floor be rebuilt for aesthetic reasons after that floor had been renovated. In addition, a large portion of the facade and about 100 steel beams had to be rebuilt.

Goldman said in August 1984 that the developers had paid the overdue rent, but the Times reported that the building was still boarded up and vacant. By November 1984, Nova-Park AG surrendered the Gotham to its lenders, a group of European banks. Hatt sued the banks, claiming that his lenders had mismanaged the project. Further complicating the situation, one of the European lenders was involved in an embezzlement lawsuit, and local bank Flushing Federal Savings and Loan, which had lent $5 million for the project, claimed that the European banks had improperly taken control of the hotel. The president of the Flushing bank was indicted on extortion charges in 1989 in relation with the Gotham Hotel.

Helmsley-Spear was hired to market the hotel, but no one was willing to buy the Gotham, as any potential buyer would have to spend $40 million to complete the renovation. By then, the per-room construction cost had increased to an estimated $500,000. Nova-Park AG itself went bankrupt in early 1985. Meanwhile, the European banks continued to pay rent on the site, even though the hotel was not making any profit. After Nova-Park AG gave up the hotel to its lenders, Goldman moved to restructure the ground lease, and he sought a partner to complete the conversion.

==== Maxim's de Paris ====
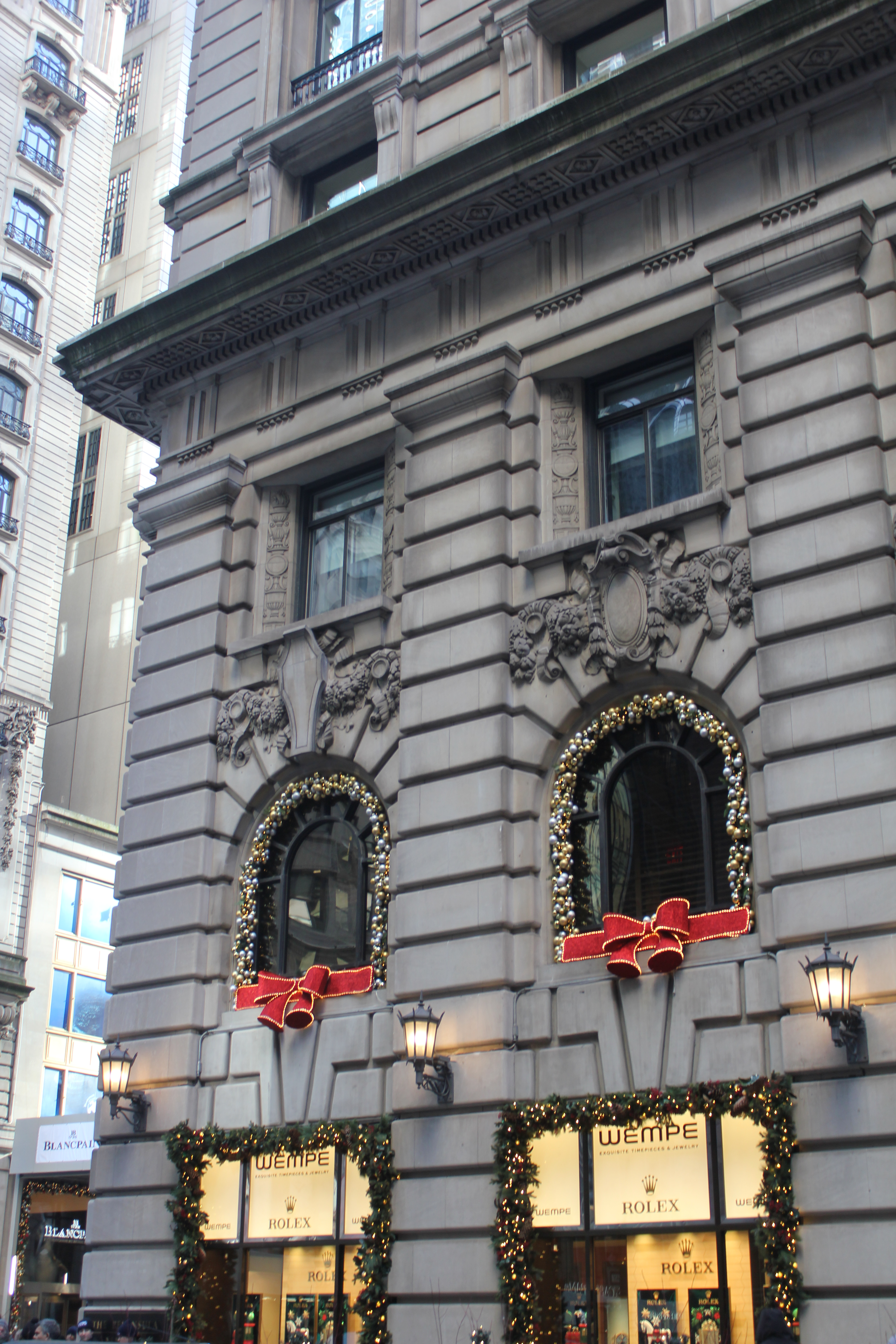
Lower-story arcade

Goldman was negotiating to lease the property to developer William Zeckendorf Jr. by mid-1985. An investment group headed by Arthur Cohen began negotiating to lease the hotel from Goldman. The European banks were not willing to sell the Gotham at a substantial loss, so the negotiations took 18 months. In July 1986, the Texas-based Pratt Hotel Corporation; the Southmark Corporation, which owned a stake in Pratt Hotels; and a group of investors including Goldman, Cohen, and Zeckendorf agreed to buy the hotel from the European banks for $35 million. Goldman would own a 46 percent stake in the hotel; Pratt and Southmark would own a 33 percent stake; and Zeckendorf, Cohen, and their partners would own 21 percent. In exchange, the European banks were indemnified against all unresolved liens on the property, and the banks ended their involvement with the hotel.

Further details of the project were announced in October 1986. Pratt planned to spend $40 million to complete the renovation. The hotel would be rebranded Hotel Maxim's de Paris, an outpost of Parisian restaurant Maxim's. This was part of a naming-rights deal that Pratt Hotels had signed with Pierre Cardin in 1984. Ivan Boesky offered to buy the hotel for $45 million, but Pratt Hotels CEO Jack Pratt refused, citing the hotel's "prime Manhattan location". Work resumed in August 1986. Goldman and Pratt planned to remove some of Nova-Park's modifications, including the decorations, which they deemed to be too gaudy. Instead, the hotel was to have 300 units, two bars, and two restaurants. A new kitchen and two elevators for room service were also installed. Hirsch Bedner Associates designed the renovation. Pratt's existing agreement with Cardin would give the latter a royalty payment amounting to 1.5 percent of the hotel's gross revenues, which would amount to almost $500,000 for Cardin in the hotel's opening year. The other co-owners, particularly Goldman, expressed skepticism about the value of the Maxim's name. Goldman had acceded to the Maxim's agreement by early 1987, on the condition that Cardin not receive any royalty payments unless the hotel made a profit in its first two years.

The Hotel Maxim's de Paris ultimately reopened with 254 units, as well as 12,000 ft^{2} (1,100 m^{2}) of storefronts. By November 1987, the hotel's owners had launched an advertising campaign for Maxim's. A preview event for the hotel was hosted the same month. The first 200 units were scheduled to be opened in December 1987 while the other units, restaurants, and bars were to open in early 1988. Maxim's was also intended as a luxury hotel, with nightly room rates averaging $310. Even though the hotel had opened after the Black Monday financial crash, the owners hoped to take advantage of a tax break that expired at the end of 1987. The Adrienne's restaurant opened within the hotel in early 1988, but a formal opening for Maxim's did not occur until June 10, 1988. Maxim's made less money than its owners expected. As a result, the hotel was placed for sale a few months after it reopened, and several foreign companies expressed interest in buying Maxim's. The hotel's retail space, which was being marketed at the then-exorbitant rate of $1,000/ft^{2} ($11,000/m^{2}), was vacant; the owners had evicted all the commercial tenants.

=== Peninsula Hotels ownership ===
==== 1980s and 1990s ====
In August 1988, Hongkong and Shanghai Hotels (HSH), the operator of the Peninsula Hotels chain, agreed to buy Maxim's New York for $127 million. HSH planned to rename the hotel after the Peninsula Hong Kong, a hotel in Kowloon, Hong Kong. HSH did not plan to significantly change the Peninsula New York's operations; at the time, the hotel had 250 units and employed 200 workers. Goldman still owned the land under the hotel. Media sources said HSH's willingness to buy out the operating lease at a high price reflected a common view that a luxury hotel chain could not thrive without a hotel in New York City. HSH officials believed the purchase price was justified by the presence of the ground-floor storefronts facing Fifth Avenue, as well as the three-story health club atop the roof. When HSH took over the hotel on October 3, 1988, its occupancy rate averaged 30 percent; this had grown to 50 percent by April 1989.

Manfred Timmel, who was appointed as the Peninsula New York's general manager, had to wait three months before his liquor license was approved. The Peninsula group faced a similar delay when it tried to obtain permits for the rooftop fitness center. Numerous employees had resigned after the hotel was sold, and there were delays in training new employees. HSH also had to pay $5 million a year for the ground lease, in addition to the usual operating expenses and mortgage payments. Nonetheless, by the end of 1989, the hotel had an 80 percent occupancy rate, and it had accommodated such guests as musicians Rod Stewart and Sammy Davis Jr. The hotel's storefronts were leased to tenants such as accessories firm Wempe's. A spa opened at the Peninsula New York in early 1991; the spa was expanded by the late 1990s.

By the beginning of 1996, HSH had raised the hotel's room rates and was planning to renovate the Peninsula New York. The Washington Post, citing unnamed industry experts, said the renovations were intended to justify the increased room rates. Crazy Shirts leased a storefront in the hotel in early 1997. That December, the hotel's managers announced that the hotel would close for renovations the following month, although the fitness center on the top stories would remain open. The renovation cost between $45 million and $55 million. The project mainly focused on refurbishing the suites and guestrooms, although the public rooms received minor alterations. During the renovation, HSH added 14 units and replaced the plumbing and electrical systems. The renovation was completed in November 1998.

==== 2000s to present ====
After the late-1990s renovation, the Peninsula raised its room rates significantly, charging a minimum of $535 per night. Tourism in New York City had stagnated by early 2001, but business was even more negatively impacted by the September 11 attacks, prompting the Peninsula's operators to discount the hotel's room rates significantly. The hotel's business had recovered by 2004. During the early 2000s, the hotel's rooftop terrace was popular among those in the media industry, and Salon de Ning opened on the hotel's roof in mid-2008, replacing the Pen-Top.

The Peninsula Suite on the 19th floor was refurbished in the early 2010s. In addition, the Clement restaurant opened at the New York Peninsula's base in 2014. Because of the COVID-19 pandemic in New York City, and a corresponding downturn in tourism globally, the Peninsula's hotel rooms were temporarily closed in March 2020. The hotel did not reopen until June 1, 2021. In 2024, the hotel's operators began renovating the Peninsula again, with electronic controls and an Art Deco-inspired color scheme in all rooms. The Bill Rooney Studio oversaw the renovation, which took several months.

== Impact ==
=== Critical reception ===
The New York Times said that, because of the development of the nearby Plaza Hotel in 1907, "the Gotham never acquired its cachet. But its classically ornate exterior helped maintain Fifth Avenue's carefully crafted image as a boulevard of the elite." The New York Times wrote of the 1980s penthouse: "It is as if a French gentleman of the Belle Epoque had crowned his silk top hat with a spaceman's helmet." The Hartford Courant described the building in 1996 as a "beautiful luxury pile that sports the Manhattan bar with the best cityscape views". By contrast, Laura Landro of The Wall Street Journal wrote in 2003 that the hotel's architecture severely constrained its layout. The hotel was used as a filming location for the 1969 film Midnight Cowboy, where it stood in for the fictional Hotel Berkley.

After HSH acquired the former Gotham, in 1989, a writer for The Wall Street Journal wrote: "You will check in at a leather-trimmed writing desk and never set eyes on anything so crass as a cash register or a mail slot. ... Even a lowly basket of bran muffins is served by a waiter in tails." A writer for The Globe and Mail wrote that the decorations were "Belle Epoque gone trop" but criticized the relatively slow speed of the room service. The Washington Post said in 1992 that the hotel's decorations, fitness center, and rooftop terrace "makes the Peninsula a welcome newcomer". The New York Times wrote in 1993 that the hotel's restaurant "offers deep armchairs and rose-tinted banquettes, floor-to-ceiling windows overlooking Fifth Avenue and an energetic, hospitable staff." A writer for the Toronto Star said in 2003, "If you feel flushed one weekend, the Peninsula's bathroom would be a great place to soak away your troubles." A reviewer for CN Traveler said the Peninsula's "huge, luxurious guest rooms, a top notch spa and swimming pool, an excellent restaurant (Clement), and one of the best service staffs in NYC make for an exceptional experience".

The Times of London gave the Peninsula New York a score of 9 out of 10 in 2024, particularly praising its rooms and central location. A reviewer for Travel + Leisure magazine similarly said that the hotel "layers its heritage with moments of indulgence", while another critic for Time Out magazine compared the hotel to a luxury apartment.

=== Awards and landmark designations ===
The hotel's 1990s renovation received several accolades, and the Peninsula New York has received the AAA Five Diamond Award every year since 1999. The first edition of the Michelin Keys Guide, in 2024, ranked the Peninsula New York as a "one-key" hotel, the third-highest accolade granted by the guide.

The New York City Landmarks Preservation Commission (LPC) had considered designating the Gotham Hotel as an official city landmark in 1966, in part because of its architecture. During the 1980s, preservationists had proposed designating the Gotham as a contributing property to a planned historic district along the midtown section of Fifth Avenue. The historic district was never created. The LPC again considered designating the Peninsula New York as a city landmark in the late 1980s; the Peninsula group did not object to the proposed designation. The LPC ultimately designated the Peninsula New York as a city landmark on June 6, 1989.

== See also ==
- The Peninsula Chicago
- The Peninsula Bangkok
- List of hotels in New York City
- List of New York City Designated Landmarks in Manhattan from 14th to 59th Streets
