= Hiss and Weekes =

New York City architectural firm (1899–1933)

Hiss and Weekes was a notable architectural firm in New York City that was active from 1899 to 1933 and constructed a number of landmark buildings of Beaux-Arts architecture.

Run by Philip Hiss and H. Hobart Weekes, the firm was known primarily for the hotels and apartment buildings they built in Manhattan. They also built summer residences for wealthy city dwellers on the Gold Coast of Long Island and in Berkshire County, Massachusetts. H. Hobart Weekes worked for the renowned architectural firm, McKim, Mead, and White, prior to joining Philip Hiss. H. Hobart Weekes was the father of Hobart G. Weekes, a longtime editor for The New Yorker.

== Selected works ==
Their works include:

- Villa Virginia, Stockbridge, Massachusetts
- Minnie E. Young House, New York City (completed 1900)
- The Belnord Apartments, New York City (completed 1908)
- Red Maples, Mrs. Alfred M. Hoyt Residence, Southampton, New York (completed 1913; demolished 1947).
- The Gotham Hotel, now The Peninsula New York, New York City
- Knollwood estate, Muttontown, New York
- Byers Hall, Silliman College, Yale University, New Haven, Connecticut
