= Red Maples (Southampton, New York) =

Former estate in New York

Red Maples (Mrs. Alfred M. Hoyt Residence)
- Red Maples in Southampton, New York.
- Interactive map of the Red Maples (Mrs. Alfred M. Hoyt Residence) area

General information
- Status: Demolished
- Type: Seaside cottage
- Architectural style: Italianate
- Location: Ox Pasture Road, Village of Southampton, New York.
- Coordinates: 40.8765°N 72.4065°W
- Construction started: 1911
- Completed: 1913
- Demolished: 1947
- Owner: Mrs. Alfred M. Hoyt (1911–1922); Rosina Hoyt Hoppin (1922–1929); James H. Snowden (1929–1932); John T. Smith (1932–1947).

Design and construction
- Architects: Hiss and Weekes, Architects; Ferruccio Vitale, Landscape Architect

Red Maples was an early 20th-century estate on fifteen acres in the Village of Southampton, Suffolk County, New York, named after the thirty or so maple trees that once lined its entrance court. The architects Hiss and Weekes designed the house, terraces and several ancillary buildings, and the landscape architect Ferruccio Vitale designed the gardens. Completed in 1913, the house was demolished in 1947 and the estate subdivided over time into eight parcels. A gate house (enlarged and relocated), and a carriage house (converted to a residence) have survived.

== History ==
=== Hoyt Family ===
Construction of Red Maples commenced in August 1911, when Alfred W. Hoyt (1863–1911) bought a 16-1/2 acre lot from James T. Kilbreth (of which 1-1/2 acres were assigned to a separate lot), located in Southampton, bounded by Ox Pasture Road, Halsey Neck Lane and Great Plains Road. In September, a newspaper reported that Hoyt was planning to build a "beautiful $50,000 residence." Hoyt intended the house to be a gift to his mother, Mrs. Alfred M. Hoyt (1835–1922), and his sister Rosina Sherman Hoyt (1874–1965), but in November, he died of typhoid fever. Nevertheless, construction continued, including the main house, a gate house, a carriage house and a tea house. An artesian well supplied water to a wind-powered elevated tank holding 20,000 gallons of water, needed to irrigate the extensive gardens.

In 1925, Rosina Hoyt married G. Beekman Hoppin (1869–1950). The announcement of their engagement in The New York Times mentioned that she was identified with Southampton's social life, and had one of its "finest places," but had been leasing it since the death of her mother in 1922. In the summer of 1926, Mr. & Mrs. Edward F. Hutton leased the house, where they gave several parties for their daughter Adelaide, one of New York's more notable debutantes.

=== Snowden Family ===
In 1929, Rosina Hoppin sold Red Maples to the oil producer James Hastings Snowden (1873–1930). In September of that year, Snowden and his wife gave a benefit lunch at the house for the Women's Maternity Centre, at which the guest of honor was former New York Governor Alfred E. Smith. Snowden died in 1930 leaving a $2 million estate, and in 1931 a destitute former Broadway actor named George T. Meech took Snowden's socialite widow to court, claiming she was his daughter while demanding that she support him. The claim was settled out of court when the daughter agreed to pay her father a $25 down payment and $20 a week.

=== Smith Family ===
In March 1932, John Thomas Smith (1879–1947), vice-president and general counsel of General Motors, bought the property. During Smith's tenure at the house, it was known as "Certosa." Smith, a graduate of Yale Law School who was fluent in Greek and Latin, dabbled in real estate. In 1936, he bought and demolished the Tiffany mansion on the northwest corner of 72nd Street and Madison Avenue in Manhattan (completed in 1885 by the architect Stanford White), and replaced it with an apartment building designed by the architects Mott B. Schmidt and Rosario Candela. Smith died in 1947, after which his heirs demolished the Red Maples house and began to sub-divide the property.

=== Sub-Division ===
In 1949, the executors of the estate of John Thomas Smith sold 1-1/2 acres of Red Maples to Ida G. Sutherland. The sale included the two-story carriage house. Smith's estate sold the remaining 13-1/2 acres to Jack and Florence Streicher, and in 1969, Florence Streicher filed plans with the Clerk of Suffolk County to subdivide the property into 5 lots: Lot 2, on the corner of Halsey Neck Lane and Great Plains Road (subsequently divided into 3 lots); Lots 3 and 4 on Great Plains Road; and Lots 5 and 6 on Ox Pasture Road.

== Gallery ==
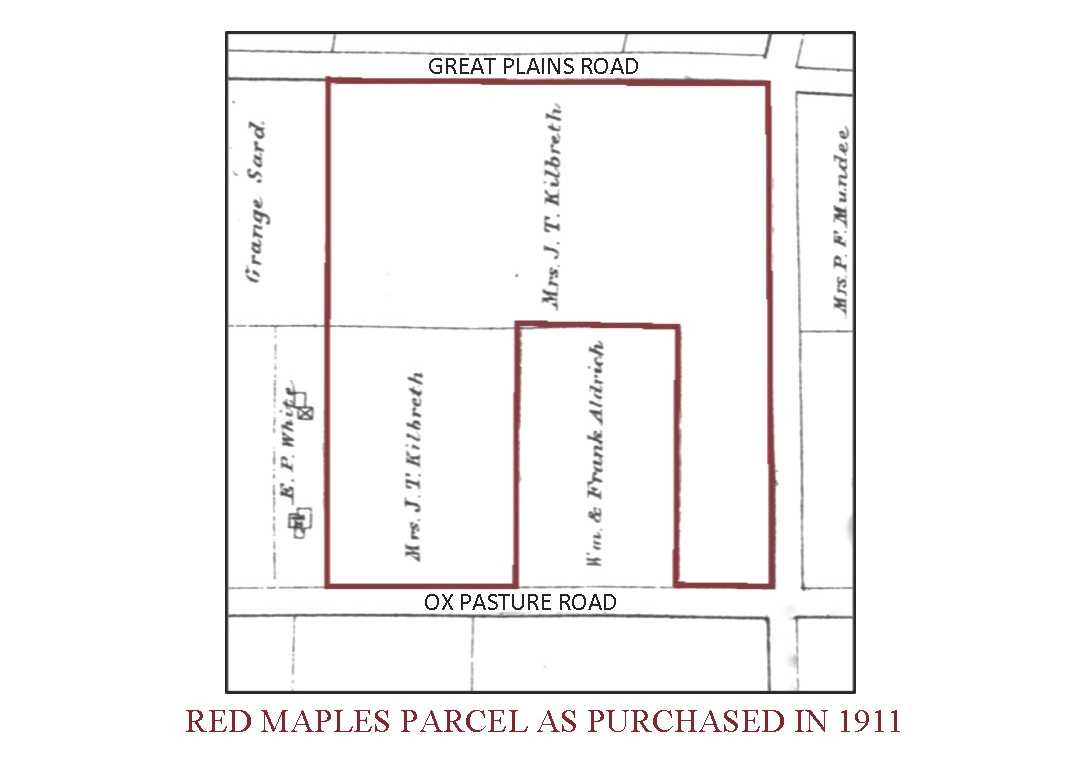
Red Maples parcel in 1902, before Alfred W. Hoyt's 1911 purchase.

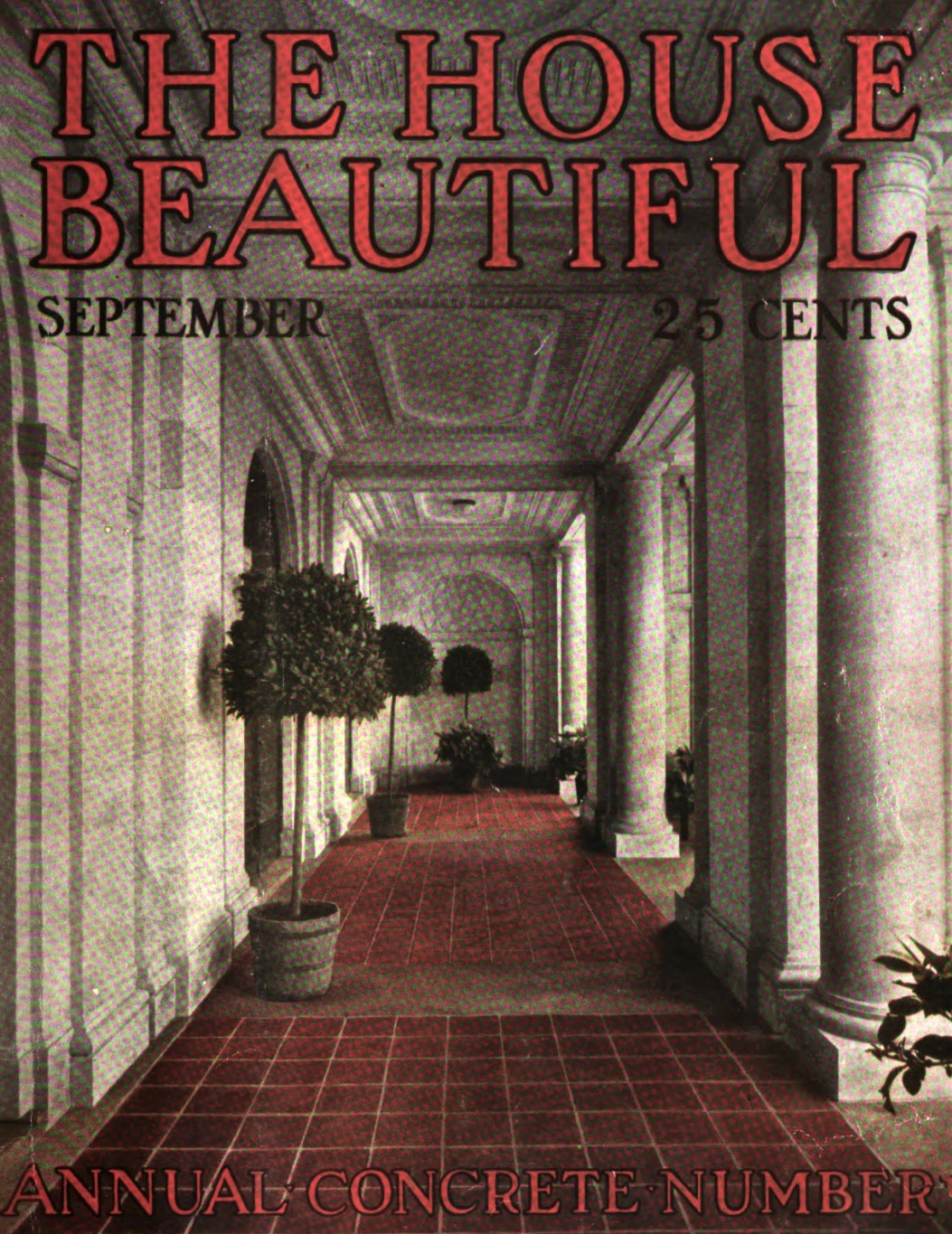
Entrance Loggia of Red Maples in 1913.

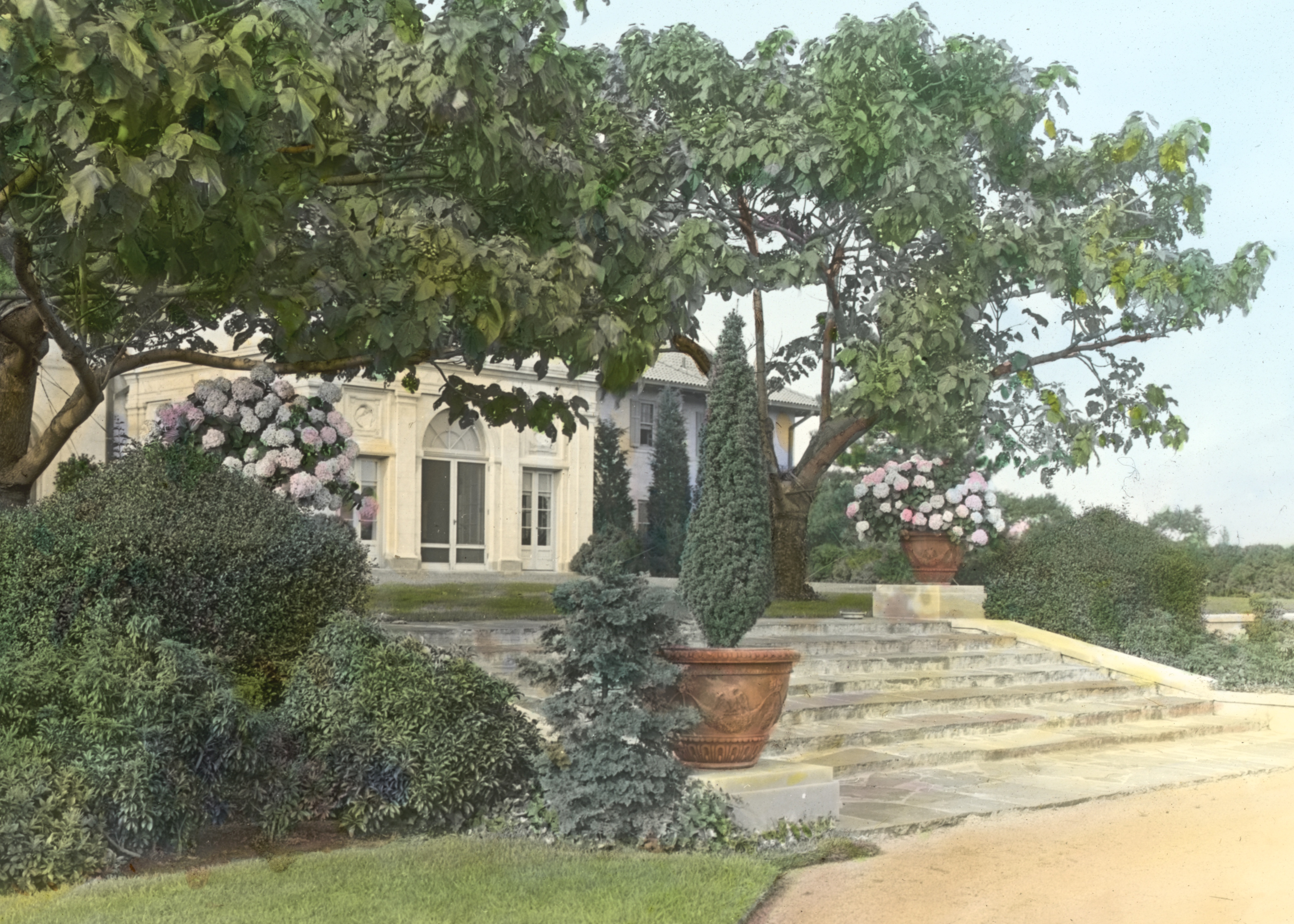
The South Terrace at Red Maples in 1915, designed by the architects Hiss and Weekes.

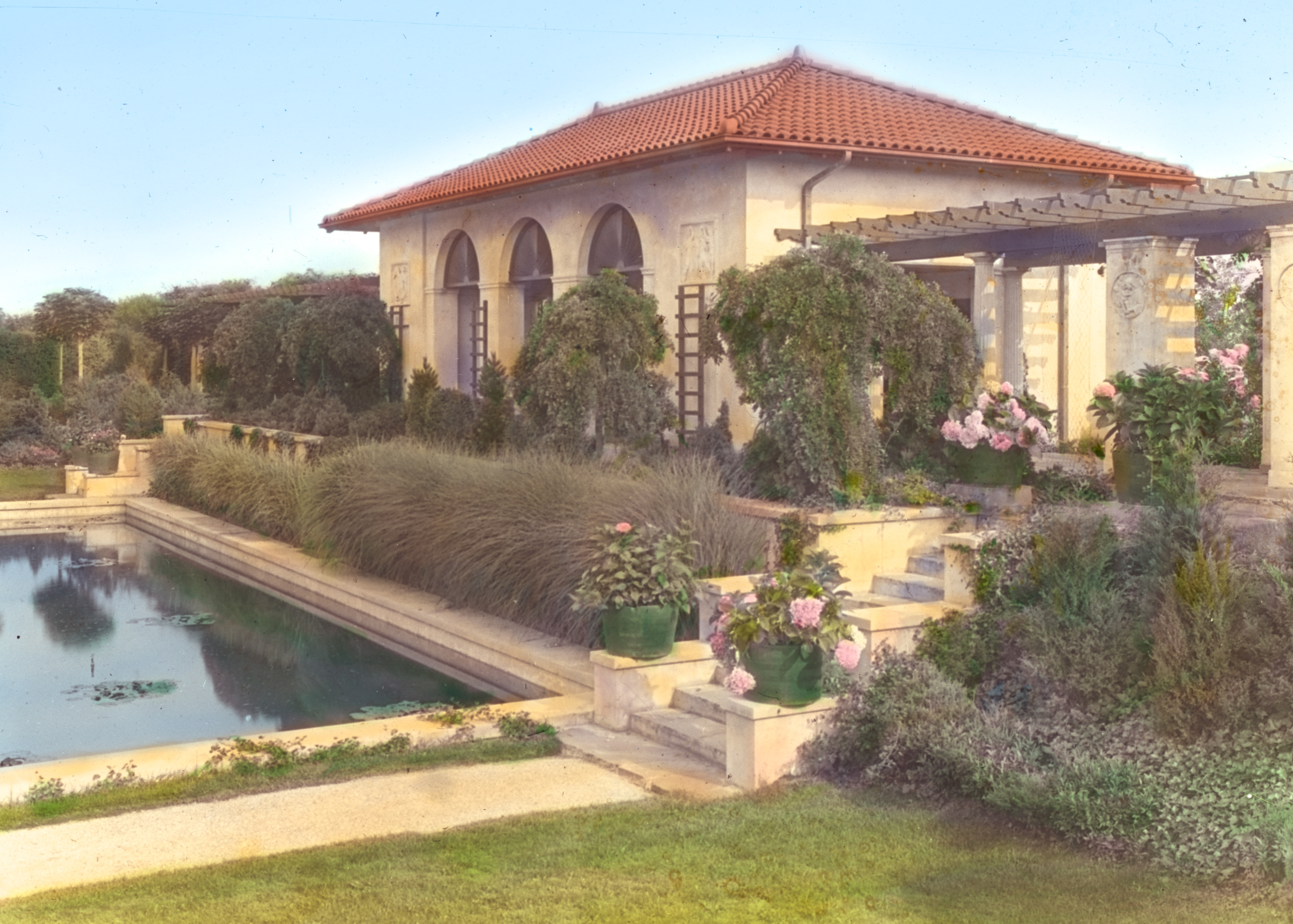
The Teahouse at Red Maples in 1915, designed by the architects Hiss and Weekes.

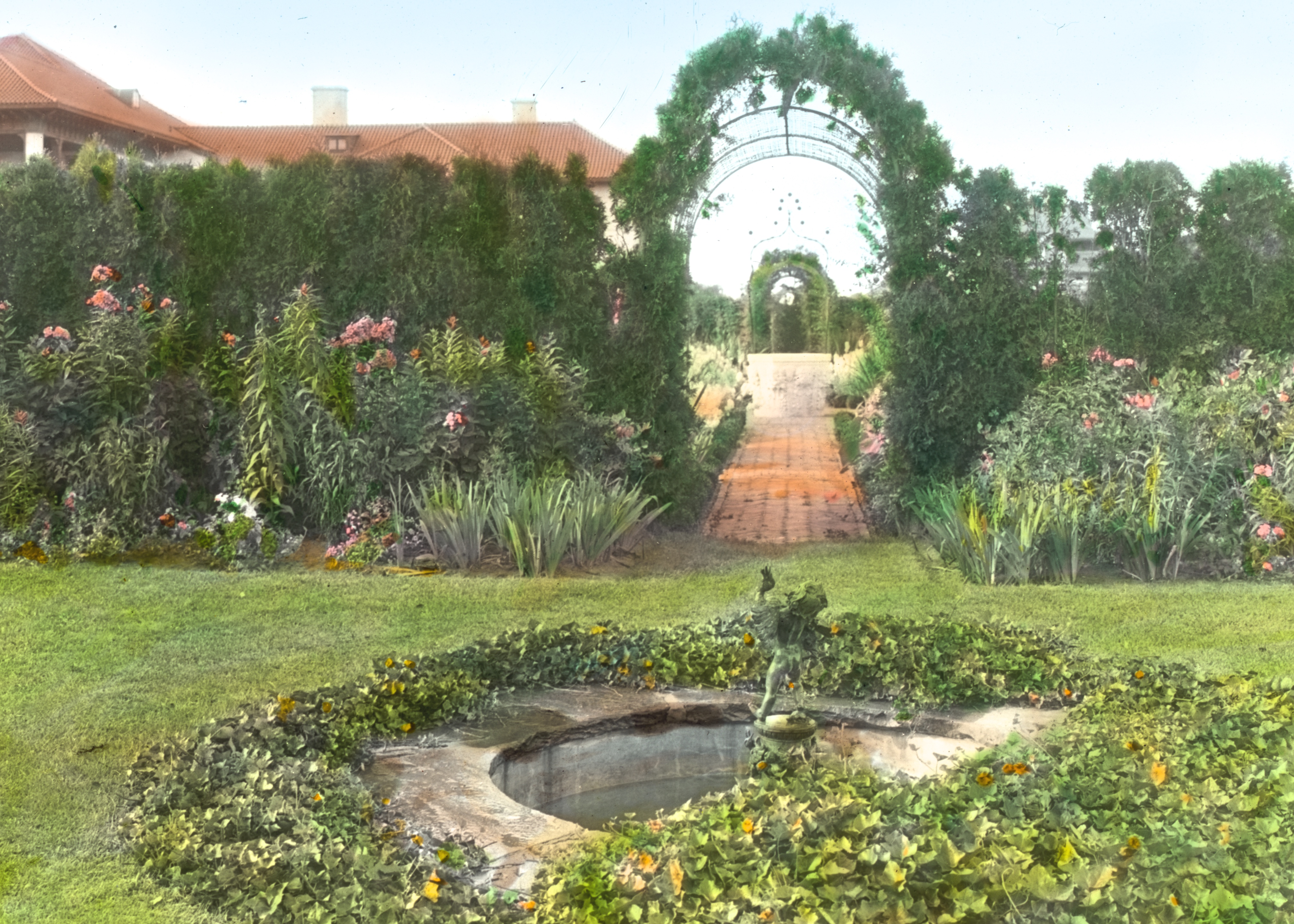
The Gardens at Red Maples in 1915, Southampton, New York.

Site Plan of Red Maples in 1918.

Site Plan of Red Maples as subdivided (as of 2019).
