= Ferruccio Vitale =

Italian-born American landscape architect

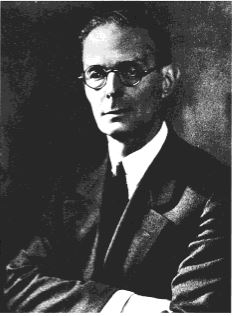
Ferruccio Vitale

Ferruccio Vitale (1875-1933) was a landscape architect. Born in Italy, he became a United States citizen in 1921. The historian Terry R. Schnadelbach considered him to be "America's forgotten landscape architect."

== Life ==
Vitale was born in Florence, Italy on February 5, 1875, the son of Lazzaro Vitale and his wife, the Countess Giuseppina Barbaro Vitale. The father was an engineer, and in 1893, the son graduated from the Royal military school in Modena with a degree in engineering. After graduating, he enlisted as an officer in the Italian army. Vitale moved to Washington, DC, in 1898 in his role of military attache to the Italian embassy. Resigning from this position, he later studied to become a landscape designer in Florence, Turin and Paris. In 1902, he moved from Genoa to New York, where he joined the firm of Parsons & Pentecost as a landscape architect. In 1908, he formed a partnership with Alfred Geiffert, and in 1911, he acquired his first major commission: the Red Maples estate in Southampton, New York.

Vitale was a member of the American Society of Landscape Architects (he became a fellow in 1908), the Architectural League of New York, and the Municipal Art Society. He served on the Fine Arts Commission of New York City, the American Academy in Rome, and the Foundation for Architecture and Landscape Architecture. He was an honorary member of the American Institute of Architects, and belonged to various New York social clubs.

In 1920, the Architectural League of New York awarded Vitale, Brinckerhoff and Geiffert its first gold medal for landscape architecture.

Ferruccio Vitale died of pneumonia in 1933.

== Works ==
- Millrose, Rodman Wanamaker Estate, Jenkintown, Pennsylvania, 1907
- Westbrook Farm, Estate of Charles I. Hudson, Long Island, 1907-1916
- Red Maples, Mrs. Alfred M. Hoyt Residence, Southampton, Long Island, 1911-1913
- Cherrycroft, Estate of Dudley Olcott, New Jersey, 1911-1912
- Brookside, Estate of William Hall Walker, Great Barrington, Massachusetts, 1912-1918. "Ferruccio Vitale created for Mr. Walker his Walled Garden, it was unhesitatingly pronounced one of the gems of this country"
- Longwood, Estate of Pierre S. du Pont, Kennett Square, Pennsylvania, 1915
- The Oasis, Estate of Francis E. Dreary, Cleveland, Ohio, 1916-1917
- Villa Carola and Trillora Court, Estates of Isaac Guggenheim and Solomon R. Guggenheim, Port Washington, Long Island, 1916-1924
- Allgates, Estate of Horatio Gates Lloyd, Haverford, Pennsylvania
- Rosemary, Estate of Jay F. Carlisle, Long Island, 1917-1921
- The Bather, Estate of Carl J. Schmidlapp, Mill Neck, Long Island, 1920
- Inisfada, Estate of Nicholas F. Bradly, Long Island, 1920-1924
- Centaurs, Estate of Alfred E. Hamill, Illinois, 1920-1927
- Villa Virginia, Estate of William H. Clarke, Stockbridge, Massachusetts, 1921
- Arthur Vining Davis Estate, Oyster Bay, Long Island, 1922
- Century Country Club, New York, 1922-1923
- Underhill Farm, Estate of Myron Charles Taylor, Locust Valley, Long Island, 1922-1924
- Chelsea, Estate of Benjamin and Alexandra Emery Moore, Long Island, 1924
- Mrs. I. Dodge Sloane Estate, Long Island, c. 1924
- Edward Schwab Estate, New Jersey, c. 1924
- Garden Village, Master Plan for Scarsdale, New York, 1924-1926
- Village Green for Town Bettermerst, House and Garden, June 1926
- Airdrie House, Estate of Edwin A. Fish, Locust Valley, Long Island, 1926-1927
- Thorneham, Estate of Landon Ketchum Thorne, Long Island, 1926-1932
- Richard B. and Jenny King Mellon Estate, Pittsburgh, Pennsylvania, 1927
- Cherrywood, Estate of John A. Victor, Locust Valley, Long Island, 1927-1928
- Donald Grant Gaddes Estate, Glen Cove, Long Island, 1927-1930
- Four Winds, Estate of Gerald Beekman Hoppin, Oyster Bay Cove, Long Island, 1927-1932
- Pretty Brook Farm, Princeton Day School, Princeton, New Jersey 1928-1929
- South Campus, University of Illinois, Illinois, 1928-1931
- Anthony Campagna Estate, Riverdale, New York, 1929-1934
- Sandy Cay, Estate of Condé Montrose Nast, Long Island, 1930
- Zalmon G. Simmons Estate, Greenwich, Connecticut, 1930
- Ca Sole, Estate of Horace and Jean Schmidlapp, Cincinnati, Ohio, 1930
- Mrs. Kersey Coates Reed Estate, Lake Forest, Illinois, 1930
- Washington Monument Gardens, Washington, D.C., 1930-1931
- Century of Progress Exposition, Chicago, Illinois, 1930-1934
- National Mall, Washington, D.C., 1932
- Meridian Hill Park, Washington, D.C., 1932
- Francis J. Allen Residence, Greenwich, Connecticut, 1932-1934
- Skylands Farm, Estate of Clarence McKenzie Lewis, New Jersey, 1932-1933
- National Gallery of Art, Washington, D.C., 1932-1940
- Canterbury Farm, Estate of Albert E. Pierce, Virginia, 1933-1934
- Exhibition Gardens, American Radiator and Standard Sanitary Corporation, Century of Progress Exposition, Chicago, Illinois, 1934
- Women in Military Service for America Memorial, Memorial Avenue at the entrance to Arlington National Cemetery in Arlington County, Virginia
- Lyman Allyn Art Museum, New London, Connecticut

== Gallery ==
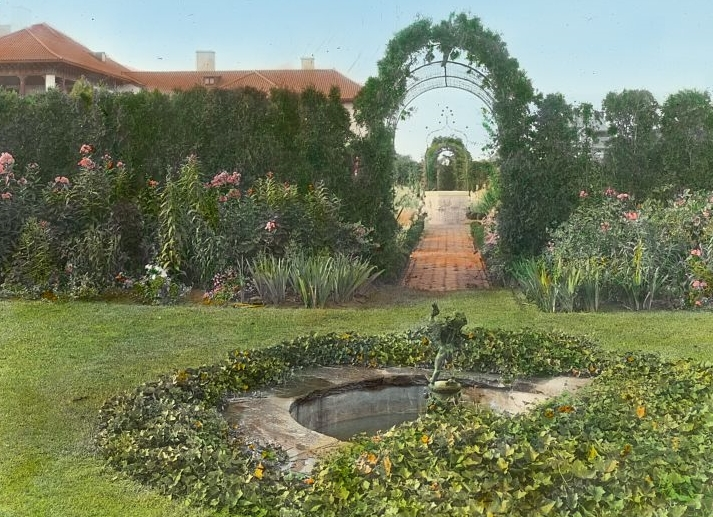
Red Maples, Mrs. Rosina Sherman Hoyt House

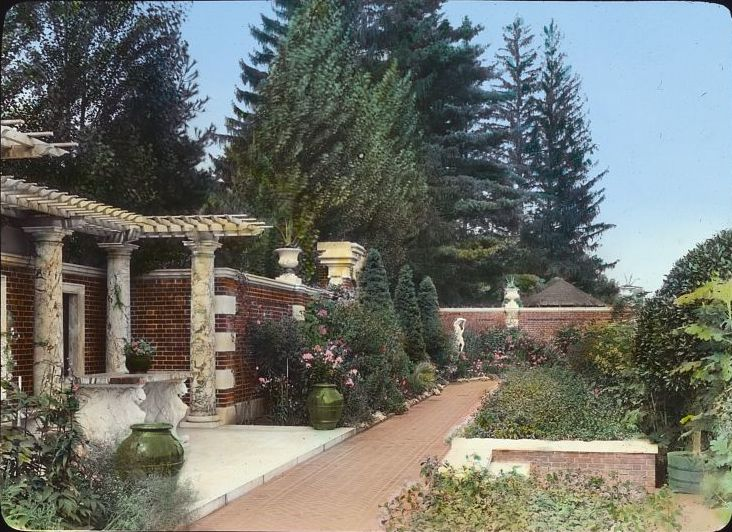
Brookside, William Walker, 1st Baron Wavertree house

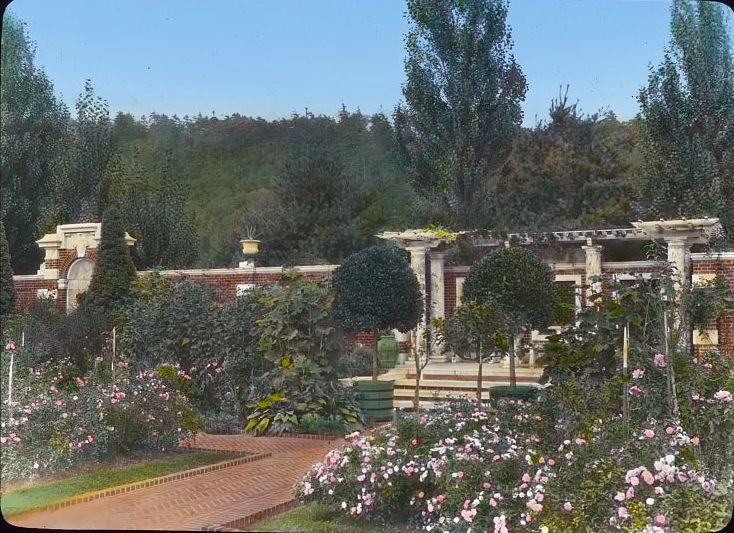
Brookside, William Walker, 1st Baron Wavertree house

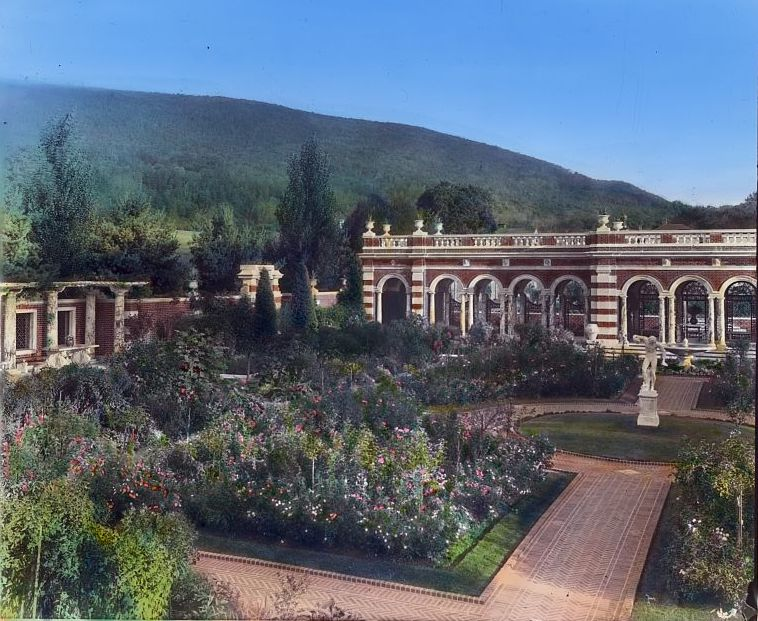
Brookside, William Walker, 1st Baron Wavertree house

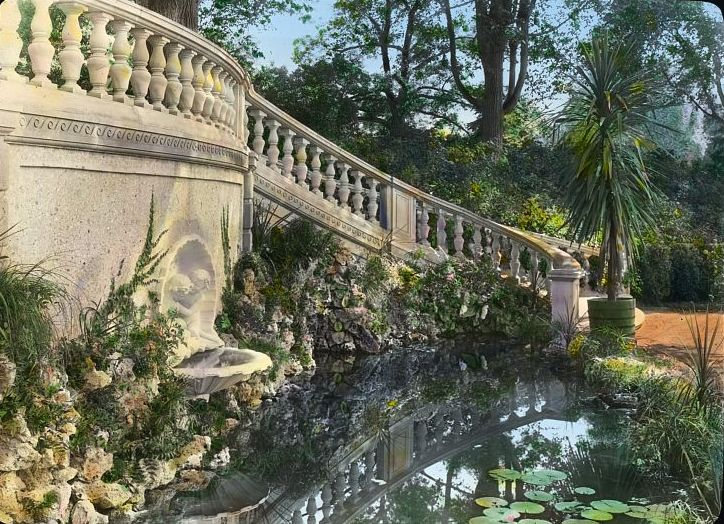
Brookside, William Walker, 1st Baron Wavertree house

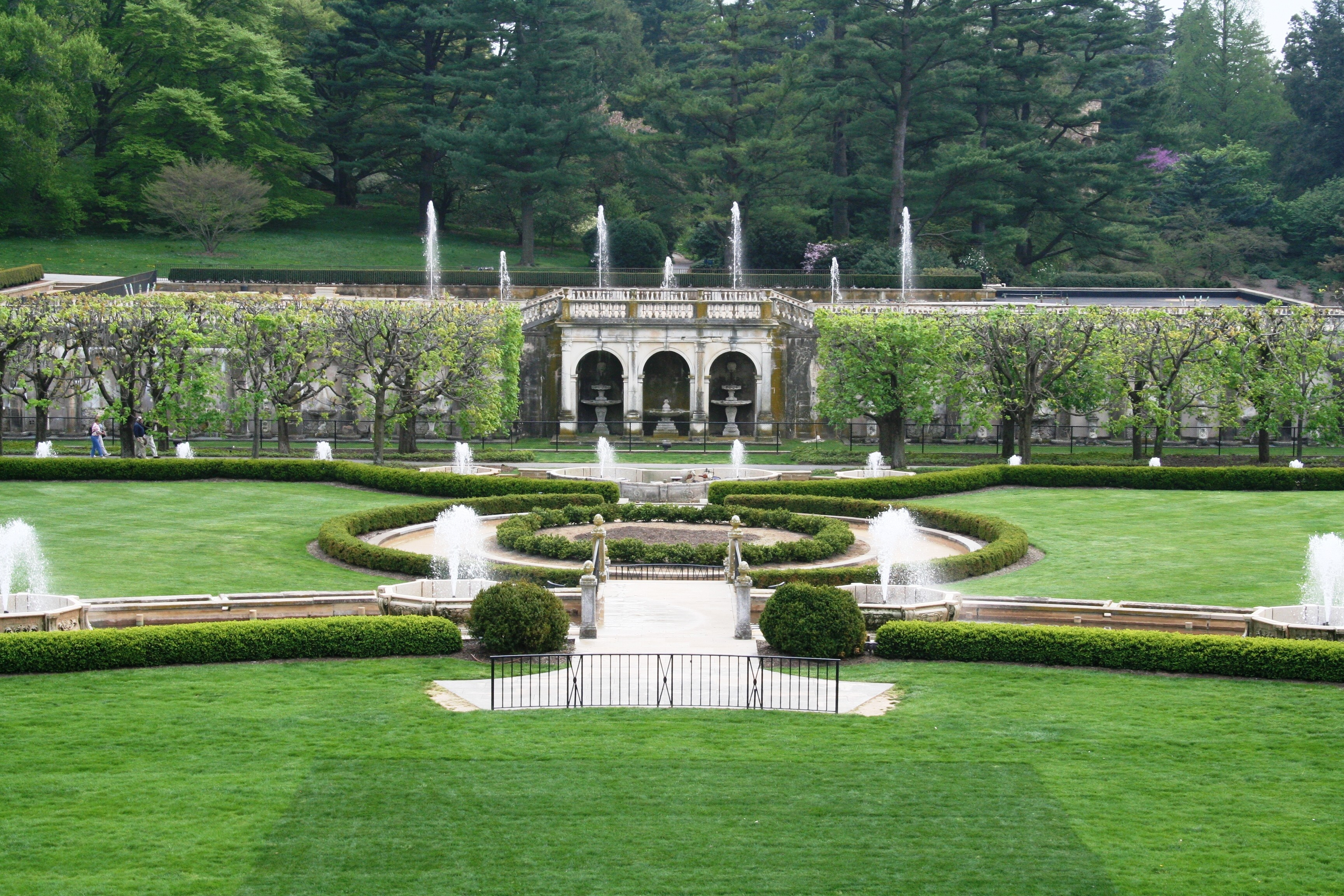
Longwood Gardens, Kennett Square, Pennsylvania

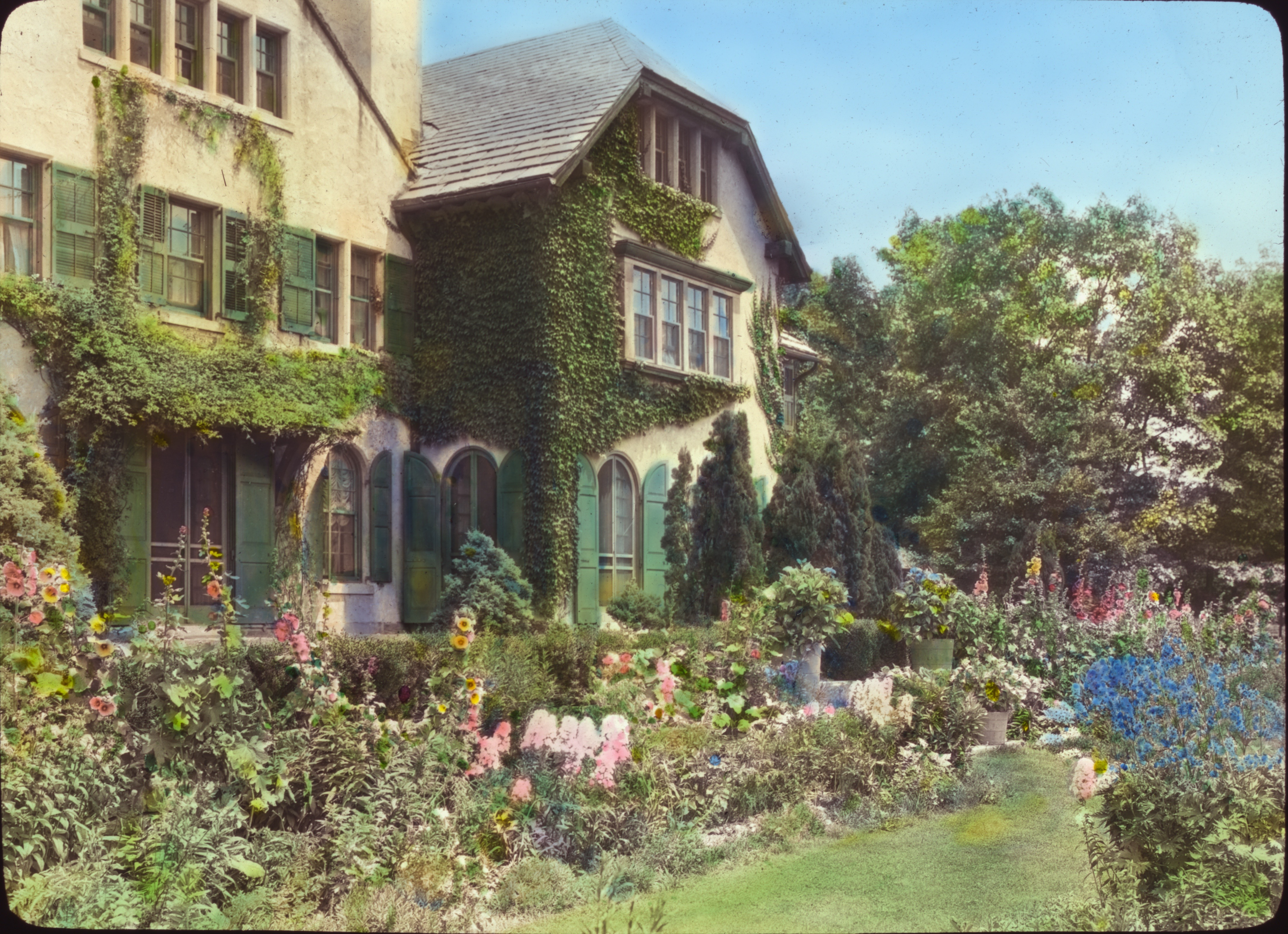
Allgates, Haverford, Pennsylvania

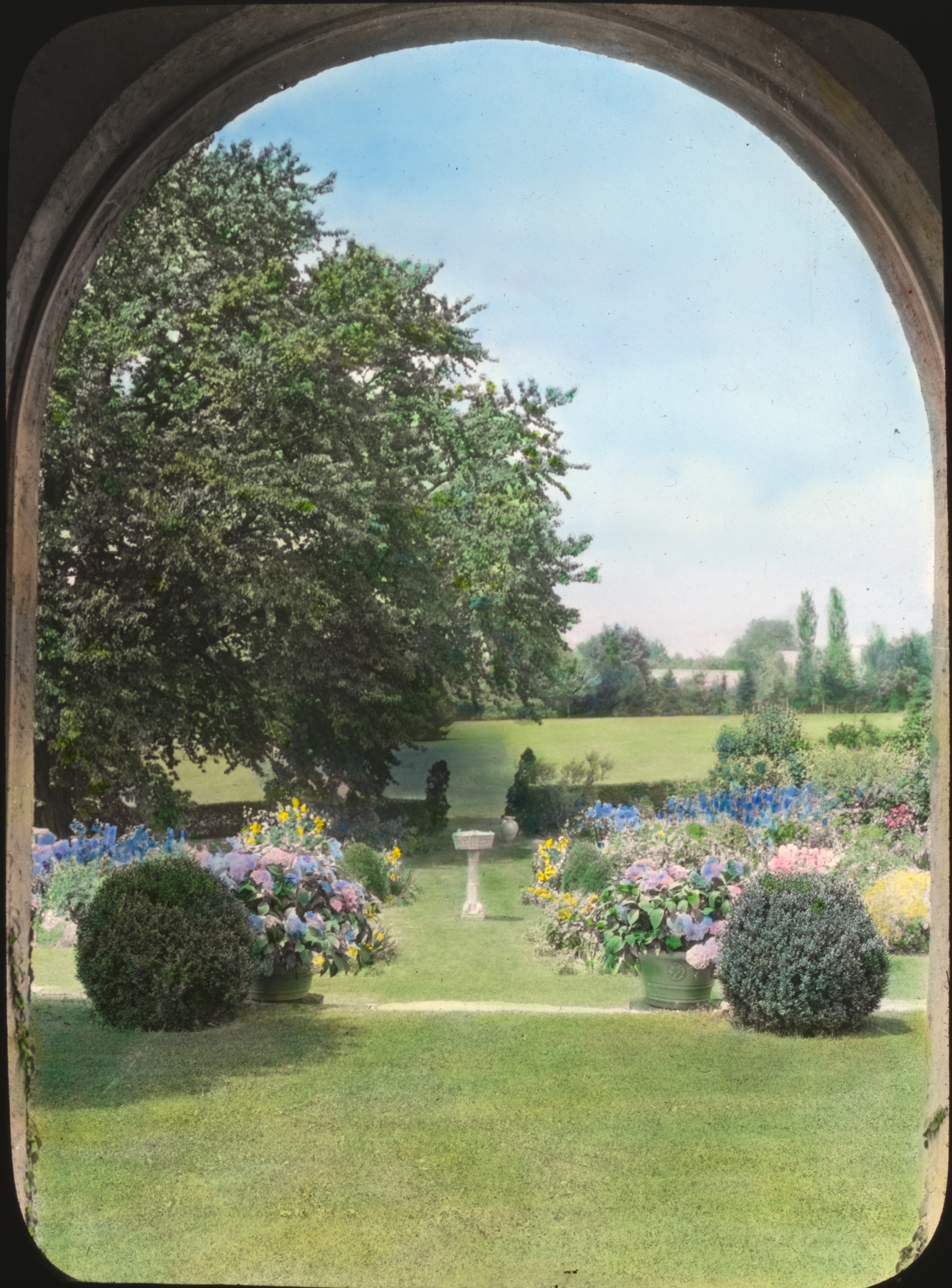
Allgates, Haverford, Pennsylvania

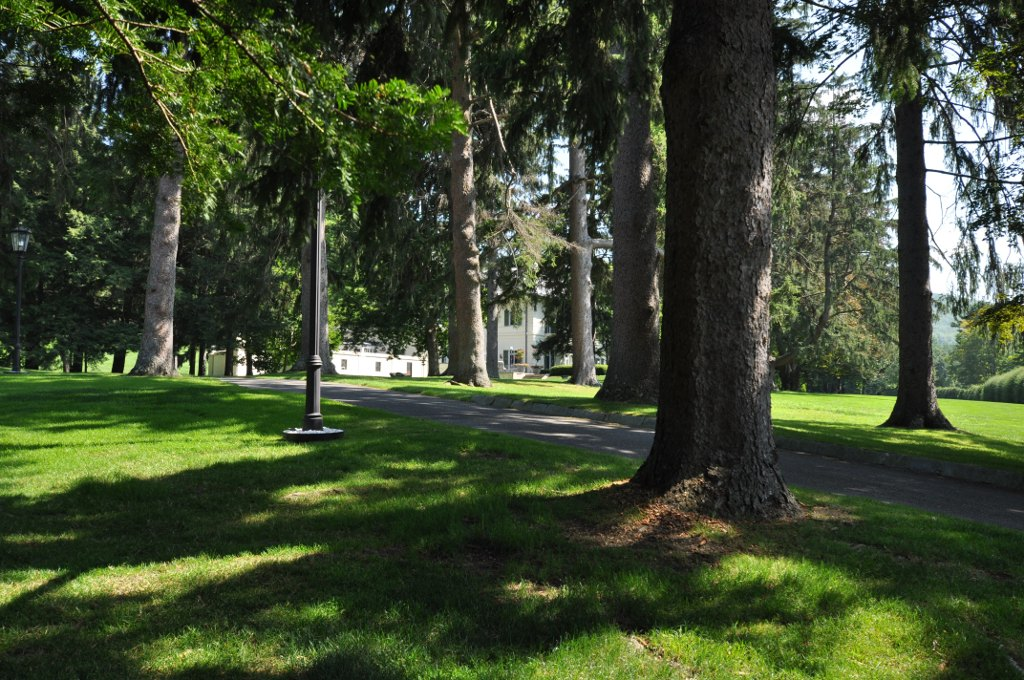
Villa Virginia, Stockbridge, Massachusetts

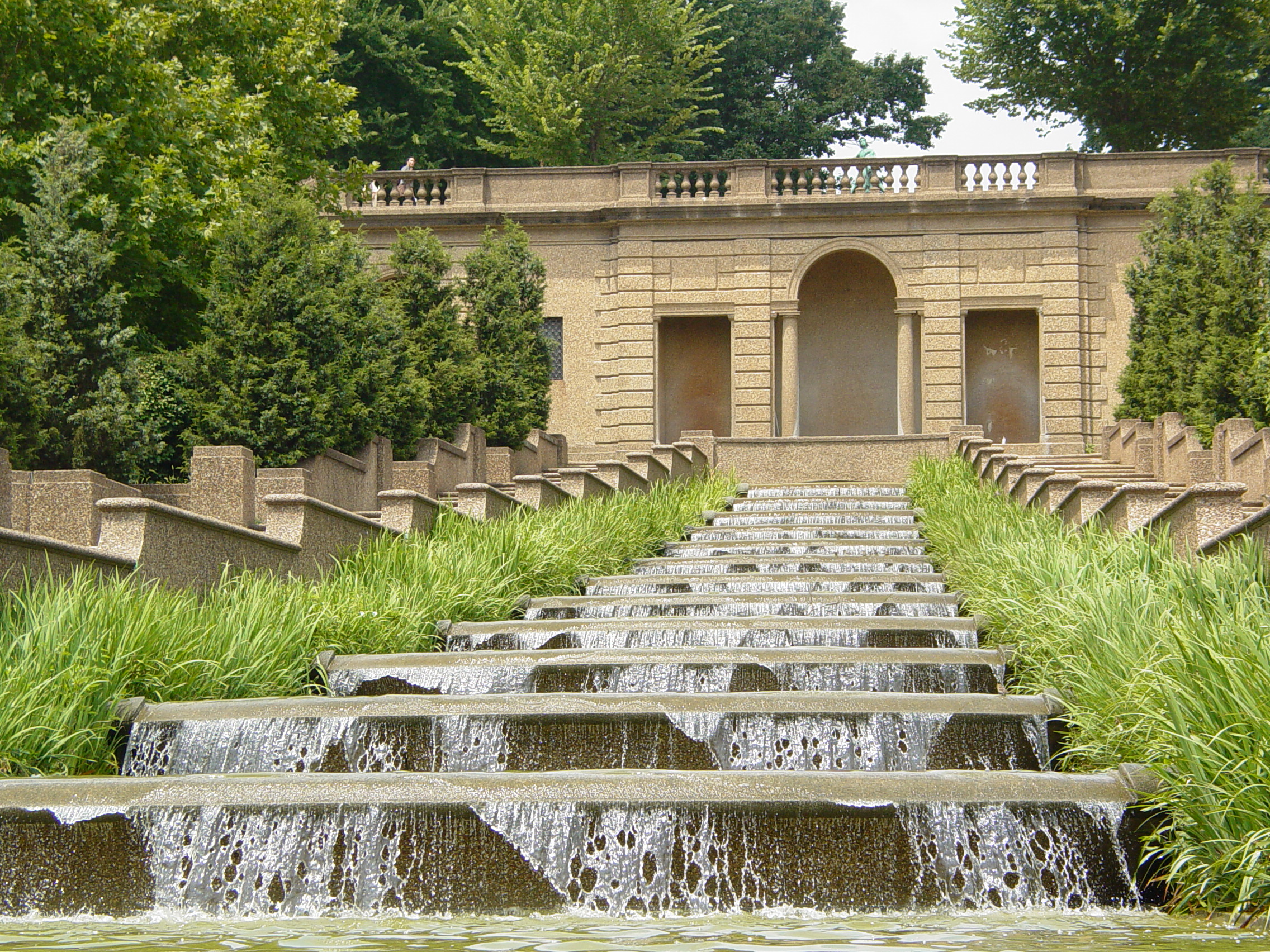
Meridian Hill Park, Washington, D.C.

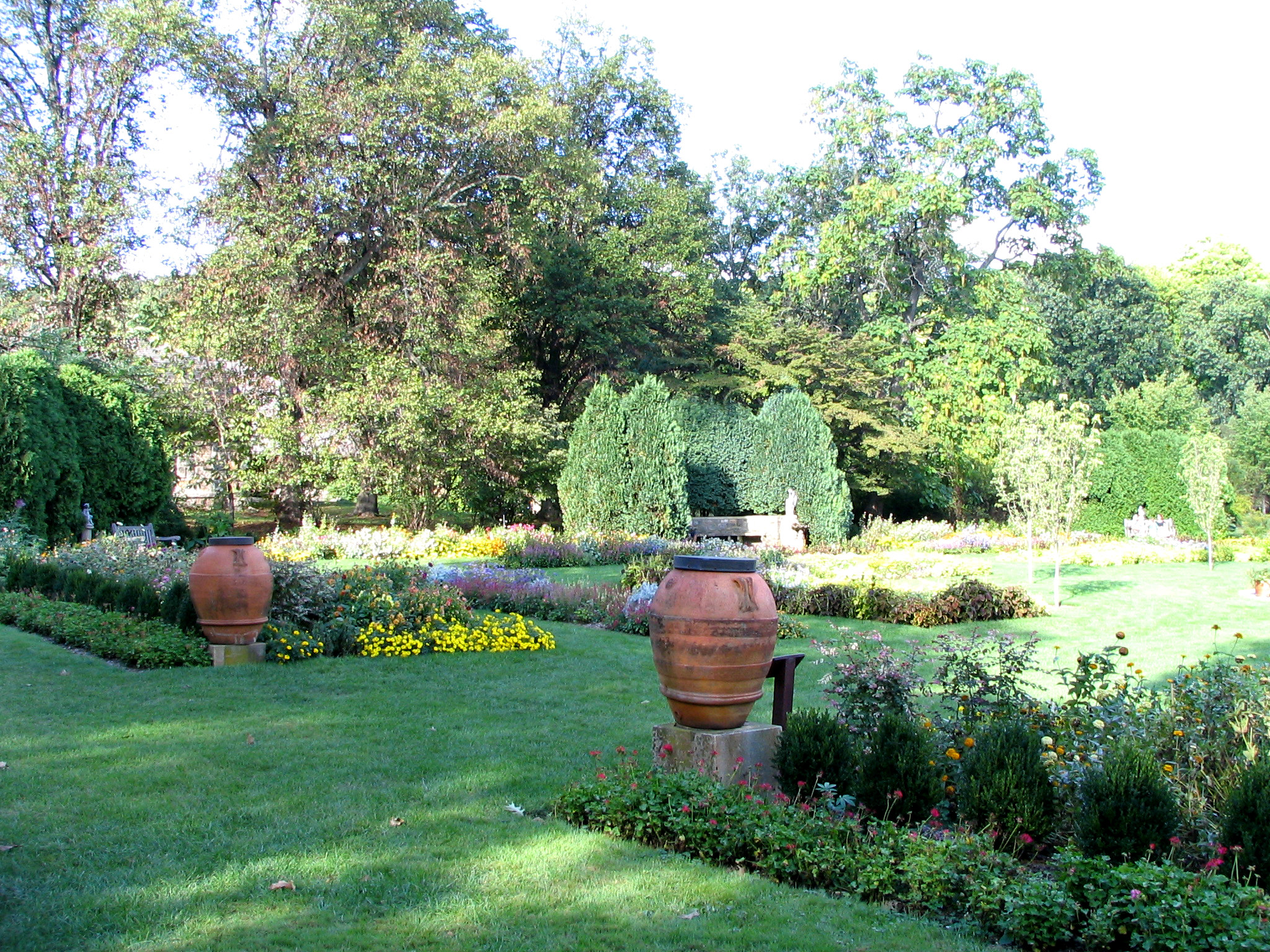
The State Botanical Garden, Skylands, Ringwood, New Jersey

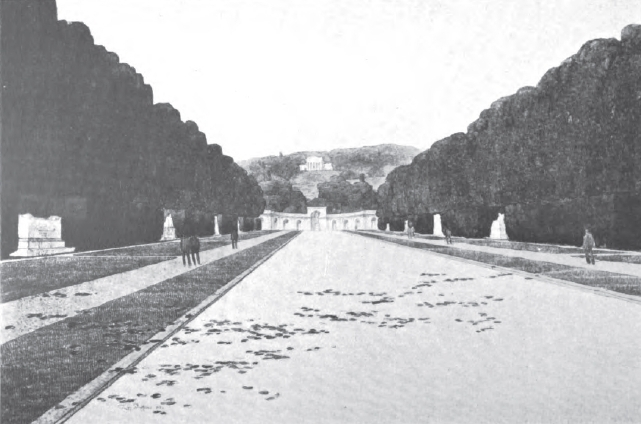
Hemicycle and Memorial Drive, Arlington County, Virginia
