= Villa Virginia =

Historic house in Massachusetts, United States

- U.S. National Register of Historic Places
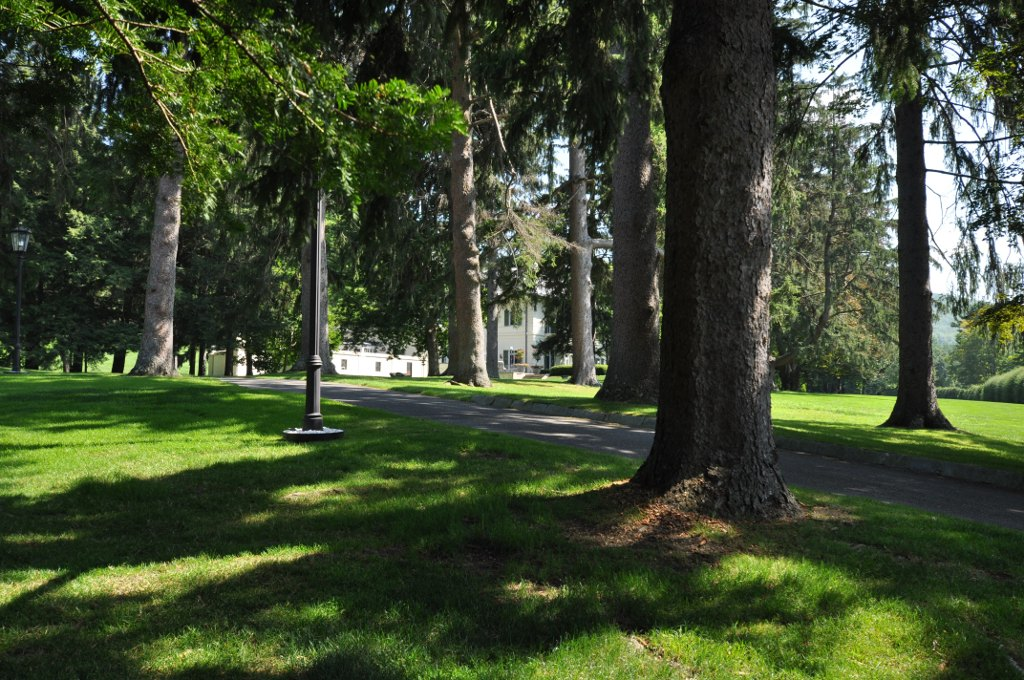

- Location within Massachusetts Location within the United States
- Location: Ice Glen Rd., Stockbridge, Massachusetts
- Coordinates: 42°16′27″N 73°18′41″W
- Area: 54.1 acres (21.9 ha)
- Built: 1914
- Architect: Harry Ellis
- Architectural style: Renaissance
- NRHP reference No.: 83003930
- Added to NRHP: November 29, 1983

Villa Virginia is a historic country estate situated on Ice Glen Road in Stockbridge, Massachusetts. Built between 1914 and 1915, it stands as one of the last significant examples of the grand Berkshire Cottages and showcases Renaissance Revival architecture. This estate was added to National Register of Historic Places in 1983.

== History ==
Villa Virginia is located on the east side of Ice Glen Road, between its northern end and the Ice Glen trailhead. The property spans over 50 acres (20 ha), encompassing the western side of the Ice Glen ravine. In the late nineteenth century, this area was part of an estate owned by John and Isabella Wyman Winthrop, who ran a gentleman's farm. The renowned dancer Isadora Duncan performed on the lawn of their property.

The site was acquired by William H. Clarke, who demolished the existing structures and commissioned the architectural firm Hiss and Weekes to build a new estate in 1914. It is constructed in the style of a Tuscan villa of the Renaissance. The estate functioned as a working farm, featuring extensive outbuildings for animals and farm machinery.

The estate's architecture is a prime example of the Mediterranean Renaissance Revival style. The landscape was designed by Ferruccio Vitale, incorporating formal features such as a lily pond, grotto, and walled garden.

By the 1970s, many of the Berkshire cottages, including Villa Virginia, were considered "white elephant" due to their size and maintenance costs. The estate became uninhabited and fell into disrepair. However, from 1979 to 1998, it was owned by Kazys Varnelis who used it as his home and private gallery. Varnelis undertook extensive restoration work to revive both the structure and the grounds.

The property was put on sale in 2019 for $10 million, and was sold for $6.75 million in 2021.
