= Kazys Varnelis (historian) =

American architect

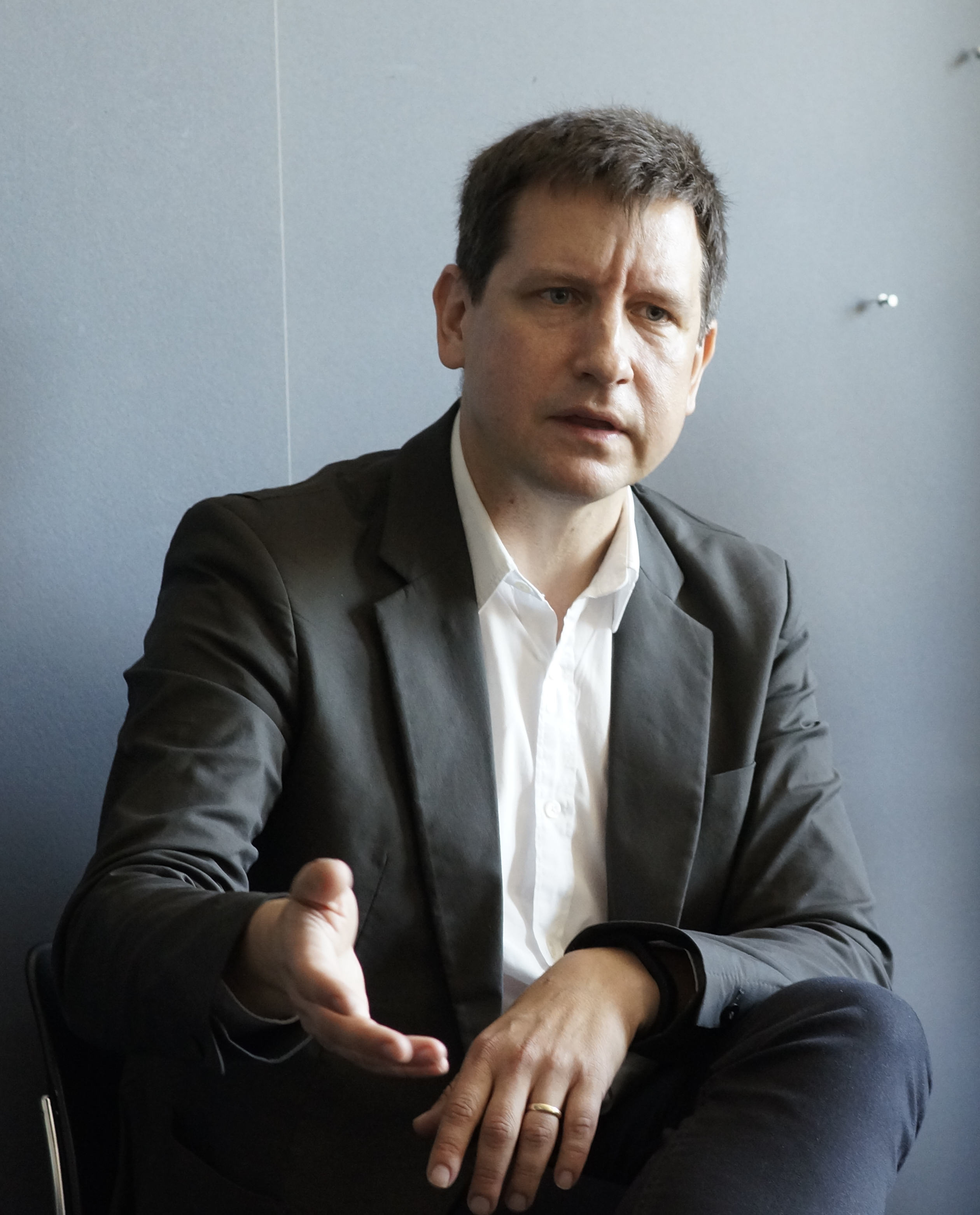
- Born: 1967 (age 58–59); Chicago, Illinois
- Education: Ph.D.
- Alma mater: Simon's Rock College (undergraduate); Cornell University (undergraduate); Cornell University (graduate)
- Relatives: Kazys Varnelis (father)

Kazys Varnelis (born 1967) is an American historian and theorist of architecture, specialising in network culture. He is Director of the Network Architecture Lab at Columbia University's Graduate School of Architecture, Planning and Preservation and a founding member of the conceptual architecture practice Architecture Urban Design Collaborative (AUDC).

== Family and education ==
Varnelis grew up in Chicago and Berkshire County, Massachusetts. He is the son of artist Kazys Varnelis. He attended Simon's Rock College and received a Ph.D. from Cornell University in 1994. He has two children.

== Work ==
Varnelis is a historian of architecture, writing on Philip Johnson, Andrea Branzi, late modern and contemporary architecture. He has published in magazines such as Log, Volume, A+U, and Praxis. He has also written extensively on the Internet, locative media art and network culture. Since 2000 has maintained a blog at his web site, varnelis.net. In addition to Columbia, he has taught at the Southern California Institute of Architecture, Massachusetts Institute of Technology, University of Pennsylvania, and University of Limerick, Ireland. In 2004, he was appointed as senior researcher at the Annenberg Center for Communication where he worked with Mizuko Ito on "Networked Publics," a year-long research project. More recently he has been involved in research on infrastructure and urbanism, which he began as director of the Los Angeles Forum for Architecture and Urban Design.

Together with Robert Sumrell, he founded AUDC as a conceptual architecture practice in 2001. They have exhibited at Andrea Zittel's High Desert Test Sites and Art Center College of Design. They have published their work in numerous magazines such as Cabinet, Perspecta, Textfield, Verb and 306090. Varnelis has also worked with the Center for Land Use Interpretation.

== Bibliography ==
=== Edited books ===
- The Philip Johnson Tapes: Conversation with Robert A. M. Stern
- The Infrastructural City
- Networked Publics

=== With AUDC ===
- Blue Monday: Stories of Absurd Realities and Natural Histories
