= Kazys Varnelis (artist) =

Lithuanian abstract painter (1917–2010)

- Born: February 25, 1917; Alsėdžiai, Lithuania
- Died: October 29, 2010 (aged 93); Vilnius, Lithuania
- Education: Institute of Fine Art, Kaunas, Academy of Fine Arts Vienna
- Known for: Painting
- Movement: constructivism, minimalism, and op art.

Kazys Varnelis (February 25, 1917, in Alsėdžiai – October 29, 2010, in Vilnius) was an abstract painter from Lithuania. He lived and worked in the United States of America for fifty years, between 1949 and 1998. His distinctive painting style demonstrated optical and three-dimensional illusions based on geometric abstractions and minimal forms. His style combined elements of constructivism, minimalism, and op art. His work is sometimes described as a modernist interpretation of Lithuanian folk art and is owned by Solomon R. Guggenheim Museum, the Art Institute of Chicago, Currier Museum of Art, and other museums. Varnelis was also an avid collector of antiques and bibliophile; his collection is now housed at the Kazys Varnelis House-Museum in Vilnius. His son, also named Kazys Varnelis, is a noted architect, art historian, and theorist.

== Early career ==
Born in Alsėdžiai in the Samogitia region to a father who was a religious wood sculptor and painter, Varnelis graduated from Institute of Fine Art in Kaunas, Lithuania in 1941. He briefly worked as director of the Museum for Ecclesiastical Art before starting graduate studies at the Academy of Fine Arts Vienna in 1943. Two years later he was awarded the degree of academic painter (German: Akademischer Maler). Varnelis did not return to the Soviet-occupied Lithuania and emigrated to the United States in 1949, where he settled in Chicago. He became an American citizen in 1957. From 1949 to 1963 he worked on ecclesiastical art and church interiors. To make a living, he owned a stained glass studio. He produced stained glass windows, bronze and marble works. In 1963 he switched his focus to private painting and sculpture. Recognition came in the late 1960s and early 1970s. In 1968 he was invited to teach at the Olive–Harvey College where he later became a full professor.

== Rise to fame ==
Varnelis presented his works at the Art Institute of Chicago in the 1967, 1969, 1971, 1974 during biennial exhibitions by Chicago artists, winning the Vielehr Award in 1969 and 1974. He held one-man shows at the Museum of Contemporary Art, Chicago (1970), Milwaukee Art Museum (1974), Corcoran Gallery of Art (1973). In a 1971 article in Canadian art magazine Artscanada Dutch-American art historian Jan van der Marck attributed abstract decorative quality of Varnelis works to the ornaments found on traditional Lithuanian crosses that his father used to make. Van der Marck also attributed structural complexity to the complexities of the Lithuanian language. Varnelis used limited range of colors and relied on technical execution for transitions between the colors.

Varnelis's early works tended to display unitary designs that could be repeated endlessly. As his works evolved, Varnelis broke away from endless repetitions and square canvas, shaping his paintings according to the subject matter. In the late 1970s he experimented with abstract architecture. Later works show elements of deformity borrowed from Surrealism and emphasized realism from Photorealism.

In 1978 he moved to Villa Virginia in Stockbridge, Massachusetts, which he extensively restored and where he had a private gallery for his works and collections.

== Return to Lithuania ==
With Glasnost improving ties between East and West, Varnelis began to visit Lithuania and exhibited his work In the Art Exhibition Palace in Vilnius in 1988. He exhibited his works in Europe throughout the 1990s in the Palace of Art in Budapest (1995), Tampere Art Museum (1996), and the Museum of Modern Art in Riga (1997).

In 1993, the Vilnius City Council gave two historic buildings on Didzioji Gatve in Vilnius, the houses of the Small Guild and the Masalski family, to the artist for his works. Varnelis moved back to Lithuania in 1998 where, with assistance from the Ministry of Culture and Vilnius Academy of Art, the Kazys Varnelis House–Museum was established in Vilnius. In 2003 it became a branch of the National Museum of Lithuania. The museum was established in a 15th-century building of former Merchants' Guild. The collection includes some 7,000 books and 150 maps, dating from the 16th century. The museum also houses paintings, sculptures, Renaissance furniture, Oriental art, and works by Varnelis. For merits to Lithuania, Varnelis was awarded the Knight Cross of the Order of the Lithuanian Grand Duke Gediminas (1998) and the Commander Cross of the Order for Merits to Lithuania (2007).

Varnelis died on October 29, 2010, in Vilnius after a long illness.
