= 46 West 55th Street =

Building in Manhattan, New York

Coordinates: 40°45′44″N 73°58′37″W

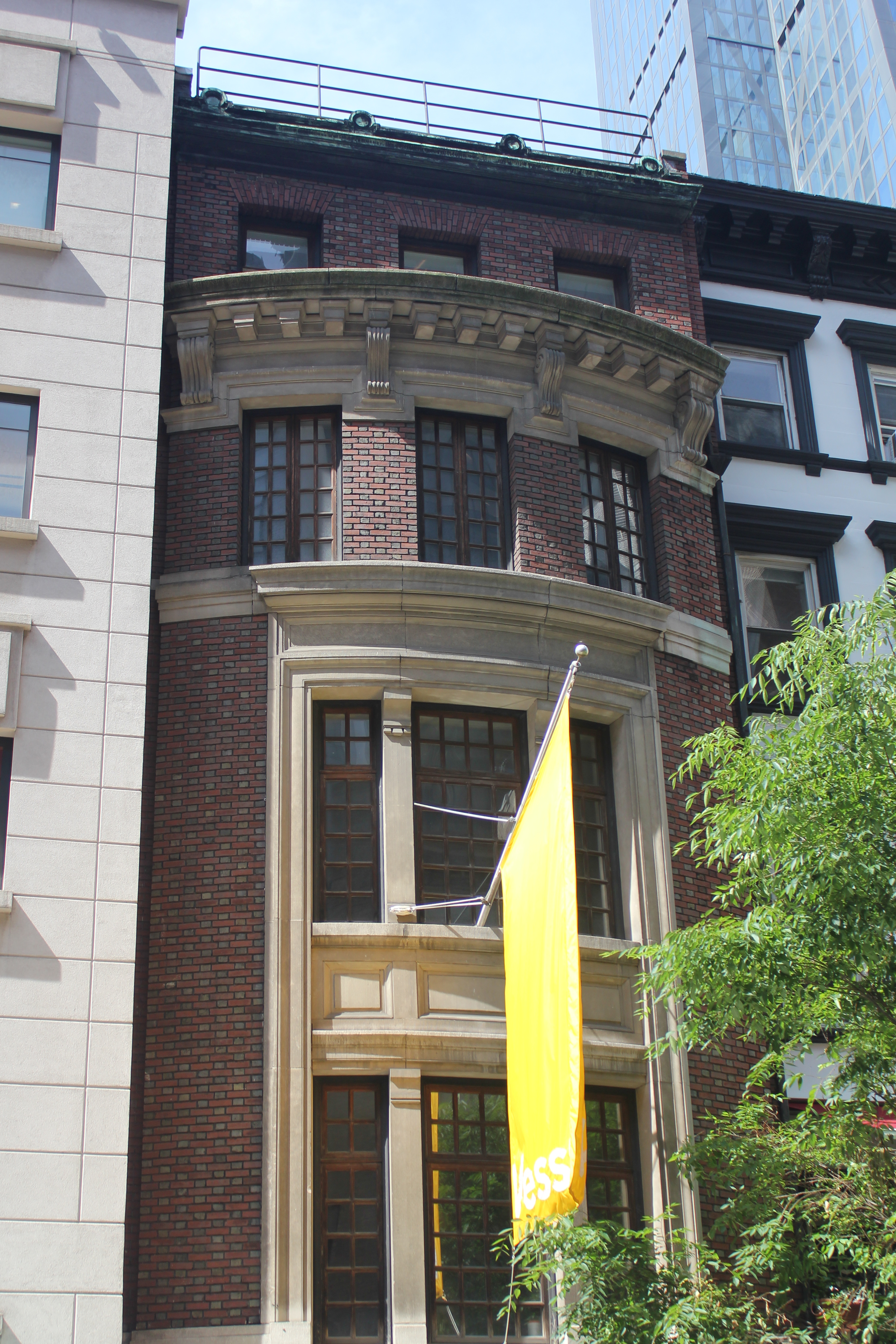
Seen in June 2021

46 West 55th Street (also the Joseph B. and Josephine H. Bissell House) is a commercial building in the Midtown Manhattan neighborhood of New York City. It is along the south side of 55th Street between Fifth Avenue and Sixth Avenue. The five-story building was designed by Thomas Thomas in the Italianate style and was constructed in 1869. It was redesigned in the neoclassical style between 1903 and 1904 by Edward L. Tilton. As redesigned by Tilton, the first floor contains a limestone entrance, while the other floors contain red and black brick with limestone moldings. The first four stories are bowed slightly outward.

The house was one of five consecutive townhouses developed by John W. Stevens and, in the late 19th century, had a variety of owners. It was purchased by Joseph Bissell, a military surgeon, in 1903 and was renovated at that time. After the Bissells moved away in 1920, the house was occupied by other physicians, including James Ramsay Hunt during the 1920s and 1930s, as well as Harry Sidney Newcomer and Marian Newcomer after 1943. In the late 20th century, the building was converted to commercial use. The New York City Landmarks Preservation Commission designated the house as an official landmark in 2010.

== Site ==
46 West 55th Street is in the Midtown Manhattan neighborhood of New York City. It is along the southern sidewalk of 55th Street between Fifth Avenue and Sixth Avenue. The land lot covers 2,008 square feet (186.5 m^{2}), with a frontage of 20 feet (6.1 m) and a depth of 100.5 feet (30.6 m). The building is on the same block as the Rockefeller Apartments; the townhouses at 15, 13, 11, 7, and 5 West 54th Street; and the University Club of New York and The Peninsula New York hotel, all to the east. Other nearby locations include the houses at 10, 12, 26, and 30 West 56th Street to the northeast; the 53W53 skyscraper to the southwest; and the Museum of Modern Art (MoMA) to the south.

Fifth Avenue between 42nd Street and Central Park South (59th Street) was relatively undeveloped through the late 19th century. The surrounding area was once part of the common lands of the city of New York. The Commissioners' Plan of 1811 established Manhattan's street grid with lots measuring 100 feet (30 m) deep and 25 feet (7.6 m) wide. The specific site of 46 West 55th Street was sold to grocer Stephen V. Albro in 1851, though the site remained vacant for the next two decades. Upscale residences were constructed around Fifth Avenue following the American Civil War. In February 1869, John W. Stevens is recorded as having acquired a set of lots measuring 50 by 100 feet (15 by 30 m) on the south side of 55th Street, about 345 feet (105 m) east of Sixth Avenue. Stevens hired architect Thomas Thomas to build five Italianate-style brownstone townhouses at 44 through 52 West 55th Street, on the south side of the street. The house at number 46 was listed as being about 355 feet (108 m) east of Sixth Avenue.

== Architecture ==
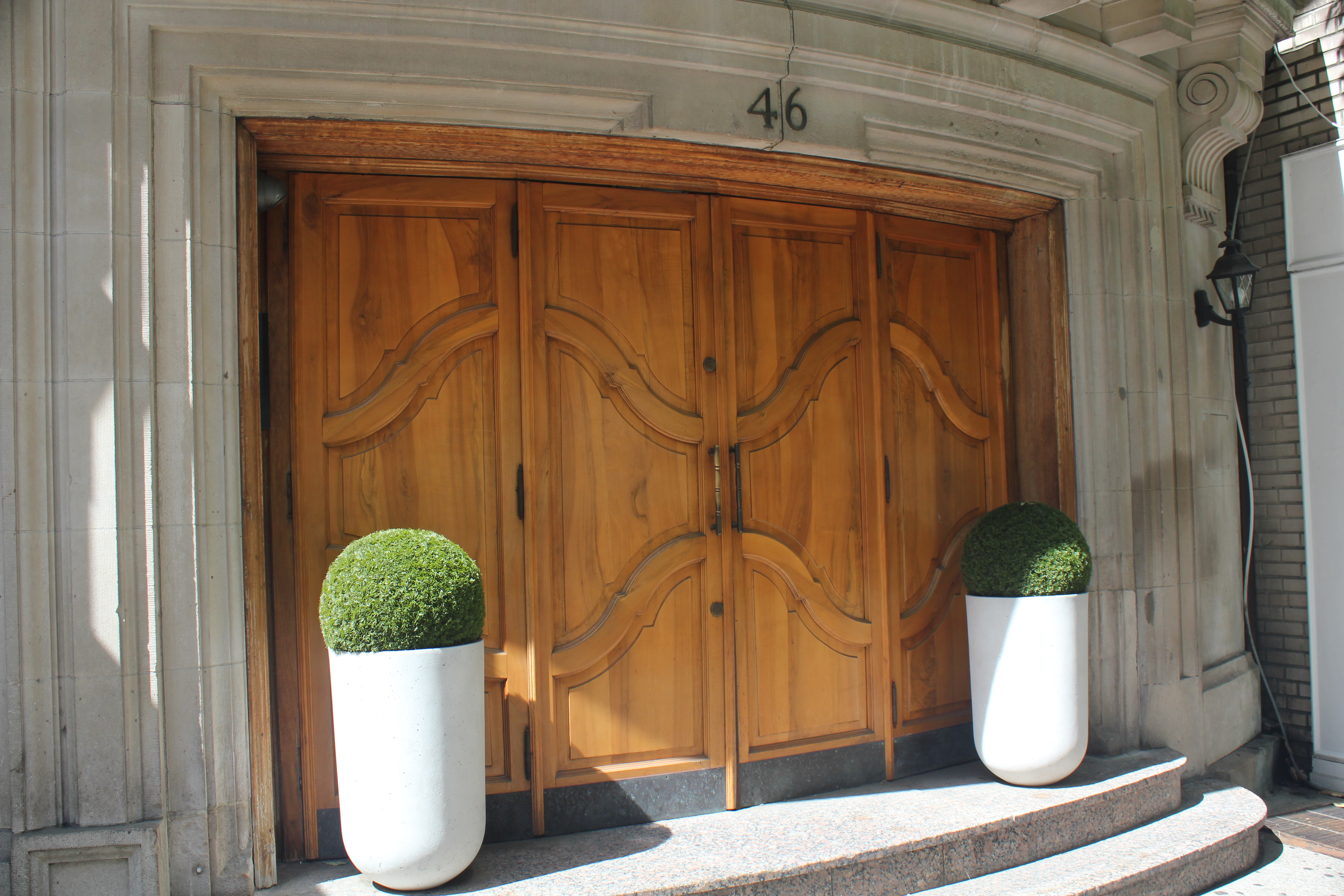
Entrance doorway

46 West 55th Street had originally been designed by Thomas Thomas as part of the grouping of rowhouses at 44–52 West 55th Street. Edward Lippincott Tilton redesigned the house between 1903 and 1904 in the neoclassical style. It is one of two rowhouses known to have been altered by Tilton, the other being at 132 West 72nd Street on the Upper West Side. The first four stories of the house are slightly bowed outward onto 55th Street. The first story on 55th Street is made of limestone, while the other stories are clad with red and black bricks in Flemish bond. The western and eastern facades are clad with red brick and contain stone parapet walls at the top.

The entrance doorway, dating from 1987, occupies much of the width of the house. Two granite steps lead up to the doorway, which has four paneled wooden doors. The numbers "46" are installed above the doorway, while bronze plaques and lamps are to the sides. Above the first floor is a cornice with modillions. The second and third stories contain a window with a molded limestone frame, as well as a set of recessed limestone panels between the two stories. Each story contains three casement windows, separated by vertical limestone mullions that contain simple capitals, Above the third story is a limestone band that doubles as the fourth-story windowsill. The fourth story has three casement windows with multiple panes. Above these windows is a modillioned limestone cornice supported by scroll brackets. The fifth story is behind the cornice and consists of a flat surface with three rectangular windows, above which are lintels containing splayed brick. Above the fifth story is a cornice with four roundels, which is partly made of bronze, as well as the roof.

According to the New York City Department of City Planning, the house has a gross floor area of 6,000 square feet (560 m^{2}). The building has five stories above a basement. It is one of several "American basement plan" residences on 54th Street, where the entrance is placed at ground level, rather than on a stoop slightly above ground as in other rowhouses. This type of design enabled the ground floor to have a staircase that was at the center of the house, rather than on one side.

== History ==
After 46 West 55th Street was constructed in 1869, it served as the residence of Louise A. Alker, who was listed as one of the house's two owners. Felicia S. Lowndes, the other owner of the house, did not live in it. The two women may have been related; records indicated that Lowndes's maiden surname was Alker. The house served as a residence for the Alker family until 1886. Katherine B. Elkins, whose father was politician Stephen Benton Elkins, was reported as being born in the house that year. Another owner rented the house at some point to sisters Maria L. and Elizabeth P. Grouard, who ran a girls' school there, possibly as early as 1891. A year book from the Architectural League of New York from 1899/1900 lists artist Blondelle Malone, of South Carolina, as a resident. At the time, James H. Young was listed as the owner, along with Charles S. Brown and Charles W. Barnes. Young sold the house to Edward Van Ness in 1901, and it was resold to Sadie S. Dearborn the following March.

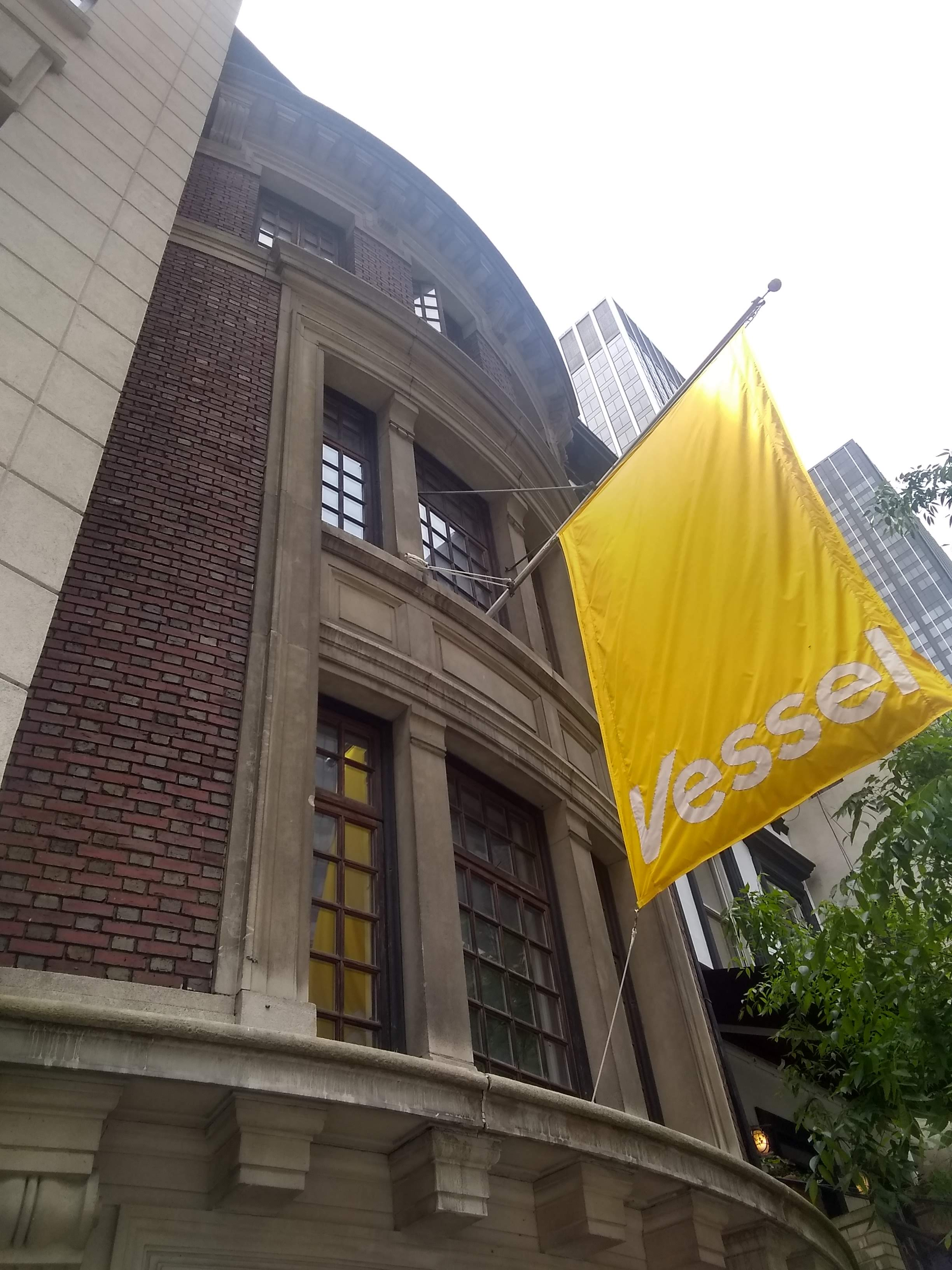
Seen from in front of the entrance

In January 1903, Dearborn sold the house to Joseph B. Bissell, who was a military surgeon. Bissell hired E. L. Tilton to design a 2- and 4-story extension, to be constructed by R. J. Mahoney for an estimated $10,000. According to New York City Department of Buildings records, the basement, first floor, and second floor were extended into the rear yard. The renovation was conducted from May 1903 to June 1904. Joseph, his wife Josephine H. Bissell, and their four children then moved into the house, occupying it with two servants. The house hosted the wedding of the Bissells' daughter Eugenie to Laurence Millet in 1915. When he resided in the house, Joseph Bissell studied the use of radium in the treatment of cancer, opening a radium hospital in the city. Joseph Bissell died in December 1918. Josephine Bissell sold the house in August 1919 and was subsequently recorded as living in Great Neck, New York.

Physician James Ramsay Hunt was recorded as having acquired the old Bissell residence and took out a mortgage for $35,000. He lived in the house with Alice St. John Nolan Hunt and their children James Ramsay Hunt Jr. and Alice St. John Hunt. The Hunts' daughter Alice recalled that the family hosted weekly dinner parties with medical and business professionals at the house. Documents from 1929 indicate that the ground and second floors were expanded at that time to accommodate a store and office. James Ramsay Hunt had his office in the house in his later life. The family had a farm at Mount Holly in Katonah, New York, where James Ramsay Hunt died in 1937. The building continued to be occupied by his widow Alice, but the Bowery Savings Bank ultimately foreclosed on the building in 1940.

46 West 55th Street was sold in 1943 to lens manufacturer Dioptric Instrument Company. The house was then occupied by Harry Sidney Newcomer and Marian Newcomer, both of whom were medical doctors. A certificate of occupancy from 1944 shows that the cellar had storage and laboratory rooms, while the first and second floors were commercial and office space. The third through fifth floors had two residences: a duplex unit on the third and fourth floors and a four-room suite on the fifth floor. Marian Newcomer had offices in the house, and her youth guidance center, the Mater Christi Guild, took up some of the commercial space. Dioptric also took up space, as did advertising company Reach Yates Matton. While he lived at 46 West 55th Street, H. Sidney Newcomer was an associate medical director at E. R. Squibb & Sons, a pharmaceutical firm. Marian Newcomer died in 1949.

H. Sidney Newcomer sold the house in 1954 to investment company Edward A. Viner & Co, which used the house as an office. At the time, the cellar had a laboratory while the top two stories were a duplex residential unit. The company relocated in 1956 to 26 Broadway, and the house was then used by several companies, mainly fashion and garment firms. The subsequent occupants included Wella Corp of New Jersey, which leased some space in 1958. The house had become totally commercial by 1987 when clothing merchant Jean Robert Ltd. bought the house and renovated the ground floor and the windows. Italian fashion company Les Copains bought the house in 2001 for $4 million to use as showrooms and offices, representing a rate of $540 per square foot ($5,800/m^{2}). The New York City Landmarks Preservation Commission designated the house as a city landmark in 2010. As of 2021, the house contained offices for Vessel Technologies.

== See also ==
- List of New York City Designated Landmarks in Manhattan from 14th to 59th Streets
