= 53W53 =

Skyscraper in Manhattan, New York

53 West 53

General information
- Status: Completed
- Type: Museum, Residential Condominiums
- Architectural style: Postmodern
- Location: 53 West 53rd Street, Manhattan, New York, U.S.
- Coordinates: 40°45′42″N 73°58′42″W
- Construction started: 2015
- Completed: 2019

Height
- Roof: 1,050 ft (320 m)

Technical details
- Floor count: 77

Design and construction
- Architects: Jean Nouvel, AAI Architects, P.C. (as architect of record)
- Developer: Hines, Pontiac Land Group, Goldman Sachs
- Structural engineer: WSP Global
- Main contractor: Lendlease

Website
- 53w53.com

53 West 53 (also known as 53W53 and formerly known as Tower Verre) is a supertall skyscraper at 53 West 53rd Street in the Midtown Manhattan neighborhood of New York City, adjacent to the Museum of Modern Art (MoMA). It was developed by the real estate companies Pontiac Land Group and Hines. With a height of 1,050 ft (320 m), 53 West 53 is the twelfth-tallest completed building in the city as of January 2025.

53 West 53 was designed by French architect Jean Nouvel and contains 77 stories; the highest story is numbered 87 and some floor numbers are skipped. The facade is set within a concrete diagrid that provides structural support for the building. The northern and southern facades slope inward to a set of five spires at different heights. The building is mixed-use, with MoMA gallery space and a private restaurant at the base. The residential portion of the tower contains 145 condominiums with interiors designed by Thierry Despont. There are also amenities spaces on floors 12 through 16 and a lounge on floors 46 and 47.

Plans for Tower Verre, a 1,250 ft-tall (380 m) skyscraper at 53 West 53rd Street, were announced in 2007 in conjunction with an expansion of MoMA. The original design was shortened by 200 ft (61 m) in 2009 after protests over the original height. Construction was still delayed until 2013 due to difficulties in securing financing. Work began in late 2014 and sales started the next year. It was officially topped out in mid-2018, and construction was officially completed in early 2020, though a majority of the units remained unsold at the building's completion.

== Site ==
53 West 53 is at 53 West 53rd Street in the Midtown Manhattan neighborhood of New York City. It is along the northern side of 53rd Street between Fifth Avenue and Sixth Avenue. The land lot covers 17,713 ft^{2} (1,645.6 m^{2}) or 18,560 ft^{2} (1,724 m^{2}). The site has a frontage of 87.33 ft (26.62 m) on 53rd Street to the south and 97.5 ft (29.7 m) on 54th Street to the north, with a depth of 200 ft (61 m) between these two streets.

Nearby buildings include the CBS Building to the south, Credit Lyonnais Building to the southwest, New York Hilton Midtown to the west, 1345 Avenue of the Americas to the northwest, the Warwick New York Hotel to the north, 46 West 55th Street to the northeast, and the Museum of Modern Art (MoMA) to the east. 53 West 53 is one of several major developments in the northern section of Midtown Manhattan that are collectively dubbed Billionaires' Row by the media. Other buildings along Billionaires' Row include 432 Park Avenue, 111 West 57th Street, One57, and Central Park Tower on 57th Street, as well as 220 Central Park South on Central Park South (59th Street).

== Architecture ==
Officially named 53 West 53, the building was designed by French architect Jean Nouvel as a 77-story, 145-unit tower. The building has 77 physical stories. The top story is numbered 87 and several floor numbers are skipped. (Note: Hines classifies the true number of stories above ground as "construction floors", which are labeled with a different "marketing floor" number. Numbering is as follows: Ground (1st) through 6th stories – floors 1 through 6; 7th story – floor 12; 8th through 34th stories – floors 14 through 40; 35th through 77th stories – floors 45 through 87; There is no physical third story and floor number 3 is skipped. The floor numbers are consistent with those in the main MoMA building, the third story of which does not extend into 53 West 53rd Street.) There are also two basement levels; the cellar immediately below ground is used as storage by MoMA, while the subcellar beneath it contains mechanical rooms for the upper stories. The highest occupied story is 890 ft (270 m) above ground. The tower technically measures 1,049 ft 8 in (319.94 m) tall from the lobby floor to the tip of its tallest spire. This makes it the tenth-tallest completed building in the city as of November 2019.

The site is split between three different zoning districts, each of which had different setback requirements. During planning, Nouvel's team designed a sloping structure to follow the setback requirements and various parcel restrictions on the site. The ultimate design for the building has five spires.

=== Facade ===
The building's facade is framed within a concrete diagrid, which shifts the tower's structural system to the exterior, thereby allowing more open space for the interior of each floor. The diagrid was designed by WSP Global, which spent over a year modifying the details of the design. Nouvel and the WSP engineers collaborated extensively on the superstructure's design because Nouvel wanted 53 West 53's facade to reflect the arrangement of the diagrid. The diagrid includes vertical, diagonal, and horizontal girders to carry weight loads while also stiffening the frame against wind. The design of the facade around the diagrid was inspired by drawings made by Hugh Ferriss.

As designed, the north and south facades slope away from the street as they rise, while the west and east facades are perpendicular to ground level. The exterior curtain wall is made of 5,747 triple-glazed panels manufactured in Germany. The curtain wall consists of glass panes, aluminum frames, and ventilation grates. Mockups of the windows were tested in a wind tunnel before being installed. The curtain wall is anchored to the concrete floor slabs. Part of the lower stories' facade, and some portions of the west and east facades that abut other buildings, are made of masonry. Custom window blinds were required for the inwardly angled facades. Most of the facade is maintained by a window-washing rig on the bulkhead, but the lowest stories of the building are maintained by cranes, and the storefront windows are washed at street level.

The girders consist of concrete poured around steel pieces of rebar. The diagrid was initially planned to be made of steel, but concrete was ultimately used because of concerns over cost, ceiling heights, weight, and collaboration with labor unions. According to WSP vice president Gustavo Oliveira, difficulties arose over how to connect the rebar within the concrete girders at each of the nodes where girders intersect. Furthermore, there were approximately three dozen nodes where at least four girders intersect; the largest node, on the north side of the sixth floor, connected six girders. Therefore, for each node, a steel core was created and rebar pieces were anchored to that core. The concrete was poured in place, except for the pinnacles, which were prefabricated. The concrete had to be poured gradually because the steel cores were almost impossible to reposition after the concrete had dried up.

=== Structural features ===
==== Foundation ====
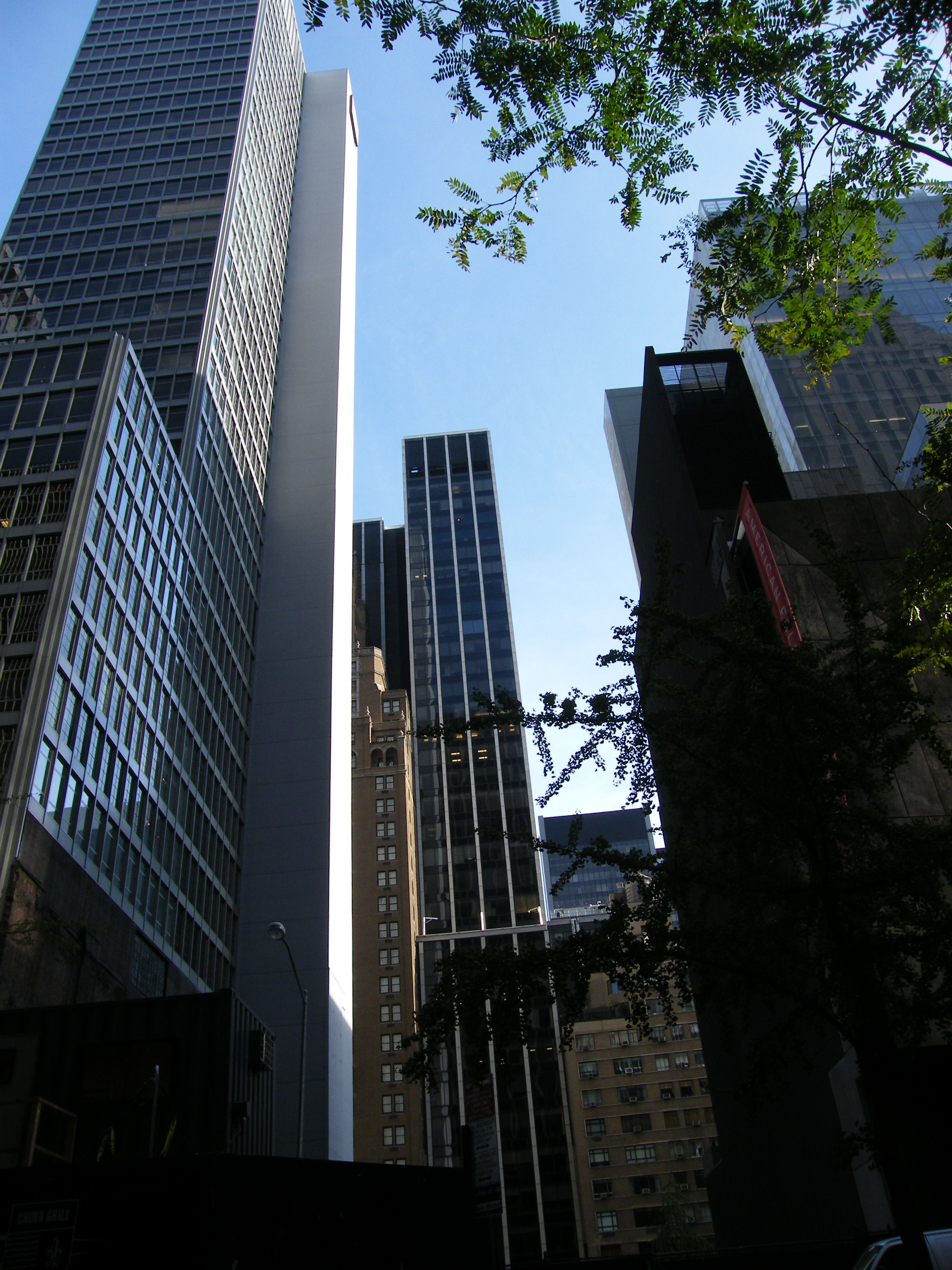
The building is between the Financial Times Building on the left and the Museum of Modern Art on the right.

Langan, the geotechnical engineer, monitored the underlying bedrock and conducted seismic planning. The ground underneath the building consists of 8–35 ft (2.4–10.7 m) of fill, followed by 5–8 ft (1.5–2.4 m) of sand, 2–61 ft (0.61–18.59 m) of decomposed mica schist, and a hard layer of mica schist bedrock. Much of the underlying ground in Midtown Manhattan could support loads of 60 short ton/ft^{2} (590 t/m^{2}), but the western portion of 53 West 53's site had formerly contained a stream. Groundwater was present 15–18 ft (4.6–5.5 m) below ground level at the site. The weathered mica on the western part of the site could only support 8 short ton/ft^{2} (78 t/m^{2}). Furthermore, the site abutted several adjacent buildings and the New York City Subway's 53rd Street Tunnel (carrying the E, F, and <F> trains). Overall, the depth of sufficiently load-bearing bedrock under 53 West 53's site varied as much as 70 ft (21 m).

The site was excavated using 33 reinforced concrete caissons each measuring 3 ft (0.91 m) across. The caissons descend at least 30 ft (9.1 m) deep. Where the site abutted the subway tunnel, the caissons descend 70 ft (21 m) deep, the same depth as the subway tunnel. Some "high-capacity" caissons were drilled at the western end of the site to shift some of the loads to below the tunnel. The floor of the sub-cellar is placed on a grade/mat foundation. The foundation is surrounded by concrete walls that are on average 2 ft (0.61 m) thick. The shear walls and columns on the eastern boundary of the site are placed on concrete footings that rest directly on the bedrock, while the shear walls and columns on the southern and western boundaries are placed on concrete caps above the caissons. The basement story is composed of a 16 in-thick (410 mm) concrete slab, while the ground story is made of a 14 in-thick (360 mm) concrete slab.

==== Superstructure ====
The main contractor for the superstructure was Lendlease. The floor slabs for 53 West 53 are generally made of cast concrete 12 in (300 mm) thick. While most of the tower's support columns are along the tower's perimeter, there are also some interior columns. Steel trusses transfer loads from the interior columns to a shear wall core along the eastern edge of the tower. The northeast corner of 53 West 53 also includes a 24 ft (7.3 m) cantilever above an emergency electrical generator owned by Con Edison. A portion of the MoMA space, on floors 2, 4, and 5, is supported by two columns, one of which is a steel column measuring 3 by 3 ft (0.91 by 0.91 m). Massive steel trusses on the sixth and eighth stories (floors 6 and 12, respectively) divert the loads above the MoMA space. There is a crawl space measuring 3.7 ft (1.1 m) high above the 5th floor. Above that is a mechanical story with separate sections for MoMA and the residential units.

At the 35th through 37th stories (floors 45 through 47, respectively), a 2 ft-thick (0.61 m) outrigger wall runs around the tower, connecting the diagrid and shear wall. Mechanical rooms are placed within these floors, dividing 53 West 53 into two segments with separate electrical, mechanical, and plumbing systems. One mechanical system serves the floors above these rooms while the other system serves the floors below. There are five steel spires above floors 21, 24, 73, 83, and 86; their steel construction allowed greater flexibility for constructing the roof. To stiffen the top of the building, the 73rd, 74th, and 76th stories (floors 83, 84, and 86) consist of 20 in-thick (510 mm) concrete slabs. A 650-short-ton (580-long-ton; 590 t) tuned mass damper was installed in the double-height 74th story to provide stability against high winds or earthquakes.

=== Interior ===
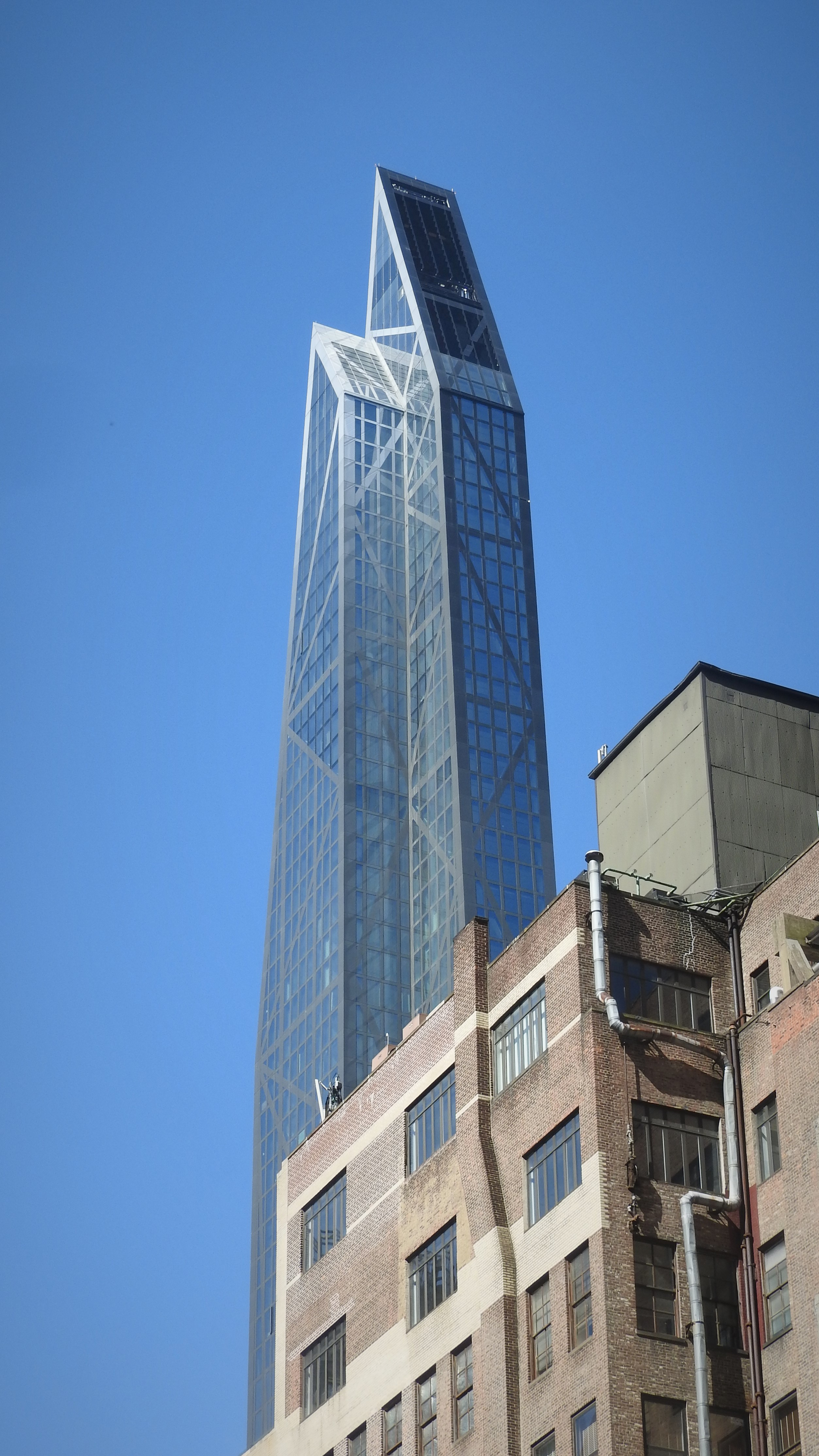
Seen from 57th Street, May 2020

53 West 53 has a total floor area of approximately 750,000 sq ft (70,000 m^{2}). The building is mixed-use, with condominiums, museum gallery space, and a private restaurant at the base. Three of the lowest stories are used as MoMA gallery space. The tower has four passenger elevators; two serve the lower residences on floors 12 through 40, while two serve the upper residences on and above floor 48. All four elevators serve the lobby, floors 12 through 16, and floor 46. In addition, there are four service elevators: one for the lower residences, one for the upper residences, and two in the basement levels. There are also three elevators within individual suites.

==== Lower floors ====
The entrances to the building are through 53rd and 54th Streets. The lobby contains 9,000 ft^{2} (840 m^{2}) of space and is divided into three sections: an entrance foyer, a main lobby, and an elevator lobby. The main lobby has a coffered ceiling as well as an oak floor with inlaid marble tiles. The walls of the lobby are covered with oak paneling, and the ceiling is supported by the diagonal columns of the diagrid. The ground floor next to the lobby also includes a library with a fireplace. There is also an 11,000-square-foot (1,000 m^{2}) restaurant named 53, which occupies the basement and part of the ground level. The 53 restaurant, designed by Lionel Ohayon, contains around 36 brightly-colored "fins" that curve across the restaurant's ceiling and walls.

MoMA's gallery space is on floors 2, 4, and 5. The gallery space includes the Daylit Gallery on floor 2 and the Studio on floors 4 and 5. There is no third story because the floor numbers follow those of the main MoMA building, and MoMA's third story does not extend into 53 West 53. The MoMA galleries are internally disconnected from the rest of 53 West 53 and are not served by the building's elevators. The only exits from the MoMA space are through the main building to the east, as well as emergency exits that lead directly to 53rd and 54th Streets. The gallery space covers 40,000 ft^{2} (3,700 m^{2}). A terrace extends from the south facade at the sixth story.

==== Apartments ====
There are 145 residences ranging from one to either four or five bedrooms. As a result of the building's shape, each floor has a different shape and higher floors are incrementally smaller. Floors 14 through 16 contain studio apartments for service workers employed by residents of upper-floor units. There are several large penthouse units. For instance, a 6,448 ft^{2} (599.0 m^{2}) full-story unit on floor 65, has a 1,400 ft^{2} (130 m^{2}) living room, a dining room, a kitchen, four bedrooms, four-and-a-half bathrooms, a den, and an office. There are also six penthouse apartments, including one designed by Fox-Nahem and Elle Decor. Some of the apartments are duplexes, such as the penthouses on floors 76–77 and 78–79, which both have a double-height living room, four bedrooms, and three-and-a-half baths. Some tenants have customized their apartments; for example, apartment 61A was redesigned with furniture complementing the beams on the building's facade.

Thierry Despont designed the interiors of the condominiums. Each residence has a different layout as a result. All residences have a custom-designed kitchen with a marble countertop, glass cabinetry, and polished-nickel decorative elements. In addition, the units have bathrooms with marble walls, limestone floor tiles, and polished-nickel decorations. There are oak floors throughout the units. The only apartments with terraces are units 17B, 17C, and 17D, whose terraces are above the roof of the building to the east.

==== Residential amenities ====
The building has 30,000 square feet (2,800 m^{2}) of amenity spaces. The basement has a bicycle storage area with 91 bicycle parking spots. Floor 12 is an amenity floor with a fitness center, golf simulator, lockers, and a swimming pool area. As of 2021, The Wright Fit operates classes and programs in the fitness center. The pool area consists of a lap pool measuring 65 by 14 ft (19.8 by 4.3 m), a spa pool measuring 8 by 5.83 ft (2.44 by 1.78 m), and a "cold plunge" pool measuring 3.5 by 5.83 ft (1.07 by 1.78 m). Patrick Blanc designed two living walls for the pool space, with 3,500 plants.

Floor 14 contains a laundry room. On the same level are 34 wine-storage lockers, each of which measures between 20 and 80 square feet (1.9 and 7.4 m^{2}). The building also contains an octagonal wine-tasting room, which residents can use for free. The wine room has a double-height gold-leaf ceiling and wooden flooring. There are 119 residential storage lockers on floors 14 and 15 as well as a children's play area on floor 16. There is also a double-height lounge on floors 46 and 47.

The building's management performs pantry stocking service, a housekeeping service, and pet walking for an additional fee. Residents also receive MoMA benefactor-level memberships, which include unlimited free admission to the museum, exhibition previews, discounts in MoMA stores, and access to film screenings. If a unit is sold, the membership transfers from the seller to the buyer.

== History ==
=== Planning ===
MoMA, which owned a 17,000 ft^{2} (1,600 m^{2}) lot at 53 West 53rd Street west of its existing building, sold it to developer Gerald D. Hines for $125 million in January 2007. Hines planned to build a skyscraper called Tower Verre on the site. Several architects submitted proposals for the tower before Jean Nouvel was selected as the architect in November 2007. Nouvel had so fervently wanted to design the tower that he told his business partner Michel Pelissié to not pressure Hines excessively on architects' fees. The building initially was to stand 1,250 feet (381 m) tall (the same height as the Empire State Building below its mast). The building was planned to include 50,000 ft^{2} (4,600 m^{2}) on the second through fifth floors for MoMA, as well as a 100-room luxury hotel and 120 luxury residential condominiums. At the time, the skyscraper was scheduled to start construction in 2009 and be completed in 2012. To build a taller structure than would normally be allowed, Hines sought to buy air rights from the University Club of New York and St. Thomas Church nearby. The purchases required the New York City Landmarks Preservation Commission (LPC)'s approval because both structures were city landmarks.

The initial plan was heavily opposed. Manhattan Community Board 5, whose district included 53 West 53rd Street's site, voted overwhelmingly in March 2008 to recommend that the LPC disapprove of the air rights transfers. In response, supporters of the tower formed an online petition to recommend that the community board rescind its objections. At an April 2008 hearing, residents stated the design would "prevent it from harmoniously fitting into its surroundings", and state senator Liz Krueger said that the building would "overwhelm the area’s infrastructure and services". On September 9, 2009, the New York City Planning Commission said the building could be constructed if it were 200 ft (61 m) shorter. New York City Planning Commissioner Amanda Burden said the top of the tower was composed mainly of "highly visible mechanical equipment". The 1,050 ft (320 m) version was approved by the New York City Council on October 28, 2009, in a 44–3 vote. The approval came with stipulations such as restrictions on loading docks and a requirement to preserve a sculpture-garden fence owned by MoMA. That year, the University Club sold the tower's developers 136,000 ft^{2} (12,600 m^{2}) of air rights.

Work was still delayed because of a lack of funding after the 2008 financial crisis. Hines and Nouvel filed new schematics for the skyscraper in May 2011 to conform with the lower height. That July, Nouvel filed a set of new plans with the New York City Department of Buildings, conforming to the guidelines that the City Council had approved for the tower. The Corcoran Group was hired in May 2012 to market units at the stalled 53 West 53rd Street project. Hines continued to seek financing throughout the rest of the year, despite speculation in late 2012 that construction would start soon. In October 2013, the Singaporean Kwee brothers' Pontiac Land Group agreed to provide a large equity investment, valued at either $200 million or $300 million. Pontiac also secured an $860 million loan from a consortium of Asian banks, including United Overseas Bank, Maybank, OCBC Bank, and DBS Bank.

=== Construction ===
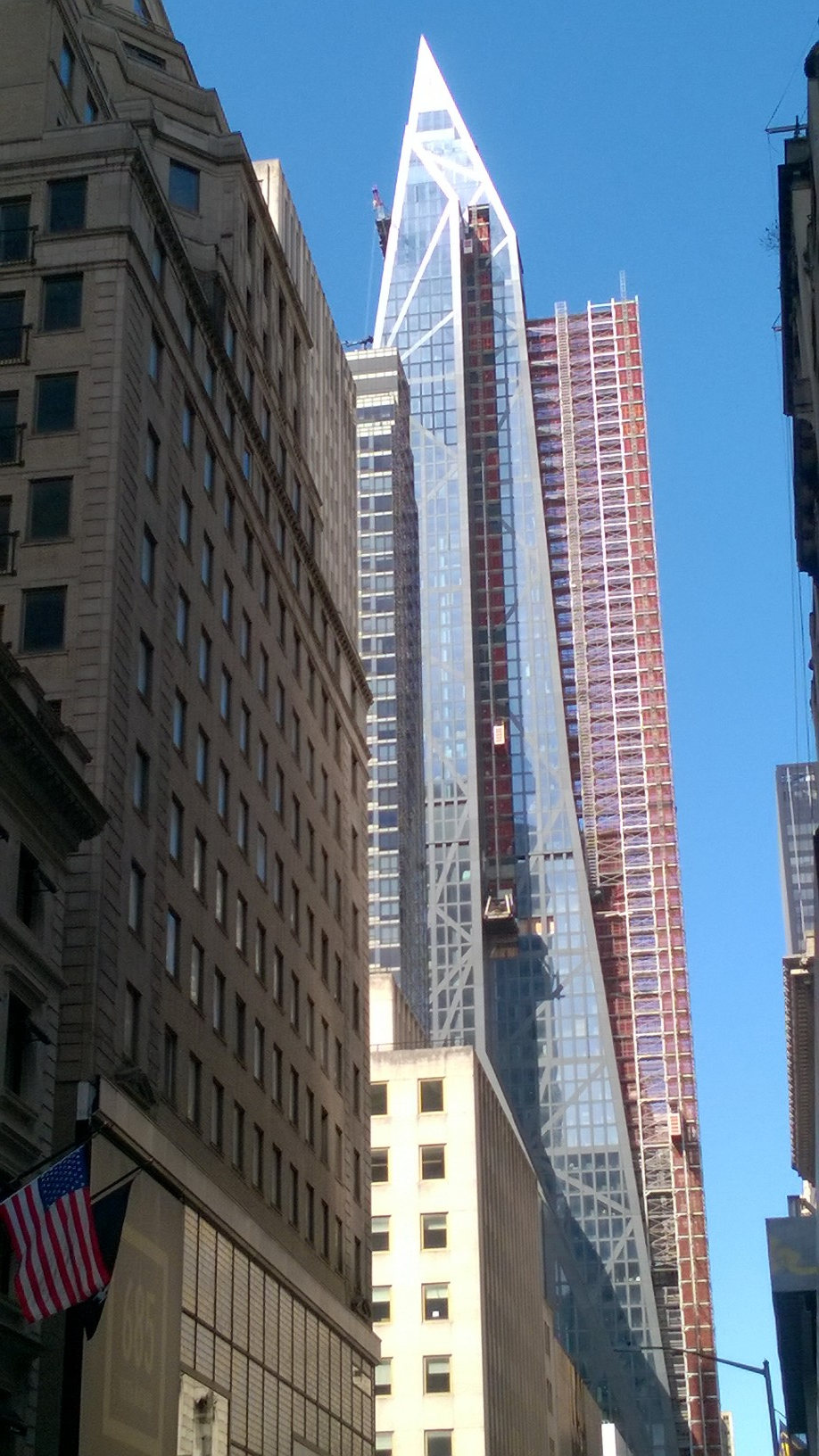
Side view of building from 54th Street, looking west with scaffolding visible, March 2019

In January 2014, MoMA decided to raze the American Folk Art Museum, which was between MoMA's existing structure and the proposed 53 West 53rd Street. The architectural community protested the planned demolition in part because that building was relatively new, having been completed in 2001. MoMA decided to proceed with the demolition because the American Folk Art Museum was in the way of MoMA's planned expansion, which included exhibition space within 53 West 53rd Street. In September 2014, Hines and Pontiac purchased a combined 240,000 ft^{2} (22,000 m^{2}) air rights from MoMA and St. Thomas Church for $85.3 million. At that time, the building became known as 53 West 53.

Work on excavating the site started later that year. Excavation proceeded slowly because of the presence of the subway tunnels under 53rd Street and other facilities owned by the New York City Transit Authority. Investment bank Goldman Sachs had joined the project by 2015. Marketing for 53 West 53 began in May 2015, and the first listings for units at the building became publicly available in that September. The units ranged from a one-bedroom apartment on floor 17, marketed at $3 million, to the penthouse on floors 81 and 82, marketed at $70 million. The building's sales gallery, on Fifth Avenue, included a digital board with information about the units and images of other Nouvel buildings. A model unit, to exhibit the materials in the interior of each apartment, was also constructed in the sales gallery.

Foundation work began in September 2015 after the excavations were completed. By November 2016, concrete pouring had reached the 20th story. Work on the superstructure progressed at a rate of one story every four days. The tower was halfway completed by September 2017, with the superstructure having reached the 58th story. Much of the superstructure and facade were in place by the beginning of the following year. The building officially topped out in June 2018, and the final spire was installed in late December 2018.

=== Completion ===
In early 2019, Hines, Pontiac, and Goldman Sachs were involved in a dispute over the extent to which they wished to reduce apartment prices at the tower. At the time, the projected sellout price for all of the apartments was $1.98 billion, a reduction from the $2.14 billion sellout cited in documents filed with the Attorney General of New York, but Hines wanted to reduce prices even more. At the time, there was not only reduced demand for luxury apartment housing in New York City but also general concerns that the facade's design could restrict views from inside each apartment. The dispute led the developers to seek arbitration. At the time, just over 30 percent of units had been sold in four years.

As part of 53 West 53's construction, the Museum of Modern Art closed for renovation from June to October 2019 so the exhibit space at the skyscraper's base could be completed. The first model residence within the building, designed by Andre Fu Studio, became publicly available in mid-2019. All construction on 53 West 53 was completed in February 2020. The first purchases for units at 53 West 53 were finalized in early 2020, with one unit selling in February 2020 for $12.8 million. By that June, fifty-five of the condos had been sold. Despite the onset of the COVID-19 pandemic in New York City in 2020, units in the building continued to be sold. For example, a two-bedroom unit was sold for about $8.8 million that July and a unit on floor 72 was sold for nearly $30 million that September. Douglas Elliman took over marketing at 53 West 53 in April 2021. A restaurant at the building's base, known as 53, opened in late 2022.

== Critical reception ==
When Tower Verre was first announced, Nicolai Ouroussoff of The New York Times called the project "one of the most exciting additions to New York's skyline in a generation". After the tower was reduced to 1,050 feet, Ourousoff described it as disappointing for Manhattan's "future as a great metropolis", while Justin Davidson of New York magazine said: "The inspiring arrogance of Nouvel’s tower should never have been quashed by timorous bureaucrats." When 53 West 53 was being completed, a writer for the Financial Times said that the building contrasted with "intense skinniness" and "the dim, expressionless glass curtain walls of corporate extrusion" across the rest of the city. New York Times architectural critic Michael Kimmelman said that 53 West 53, along with 111 West 57th Street, "promise to help tip the scales back toward an older ideal of the sophisticated, attenuated tower", in contrast to what he perceived as "decades of plug-and-play boxes".

The tower also garnered criticism, including the controversies over its original height and the American Folk Art Museum's demolition. In 2015, when the tower was still in development, a neighborhood group protested the fact that 53 West 53 and other Billionaires' Row towers would cast long shadows over Central Park. Some critics also said 53 West 53 was a symbol of wealth inequality within New York City.

== See also ==
- List of tallest buildings in New York City
