= Adolfo (designer) =

Cuban designer and milliner (1923–2021)

Adolfo Faustino Sardiña (February 15, 1923 – November 27, 2021), professionally known as Adolfo, was an American fashion designer who started out as a milliner in the 1950s. While chief designer for the wholesale milliners Emme, he won the Coty Award and the Neiman Marcus Fashion Award. In 1963 he set up his own salon in New York, firstly as a milliner, and then focusing on clothing. He retired from fashion design in 1993.

== Early life ==
Adolfo Sardiña was born in Cárdenas, Cuba on February 15, 1923. His mother, Marina Gonzales, was Irish; his father, Waldo Sardiña, who worked as a lawyer, Spanish. Marina died in childbirth, and Waldo died sometime during Adolfo's early childhood. As a result, he was raised by his aunt, María López, and his godfather. He attended the St Ignacio de Loyola Jesuit School in Havana and served in the Cuban Army. In 1948 Adolfo immigrated to New York, but would not become an official US citizen until 1958.

== Millinery ==
As his mother had died in childbirth, Adolfo was brought up by an aunt who enjoyed wearing French haute couture, and encouraged her nephew to pursue fashion design. which he had ultimately decided to commit to at the age of 10. When he was 16, his aunt began taking him to fashion shows in Paris, where he met Coco Chanel, but was too shy to talk to her at the time. At 17, he became an apprentice for Erik Braagaard, a hat designer. In 1948, he became an apprentice millinery designer for Bergdorf Goodman. When he requested that his name could be put on hat labels for the brand, he was turned down, which subsequently lead to him leaving the company in 1951. Following this, with his aunt's help, Adolfo joined Cristóbal Balenciaga as an apprentice milliner, where his first job was picking pins up off the floor. He worked at Balenciaga from 1950 to 1952.

In 1953 Adolfo joined the New York-based wholesale millinery company Emme as their chief designer. He worked with Emme until 1958. Meanwhile, in the summer of 1957, to further his skills, he served an unpaid apprenticeship with Coco Chanel's New York hat salon. Adolfo would later admit that he "never enjoyed making hats."

Adolfo won a Coty Award in 1955 for millinery. In 1959, Emme were awarded the Neiman Marcus Fashion Award.

== Fashion ==
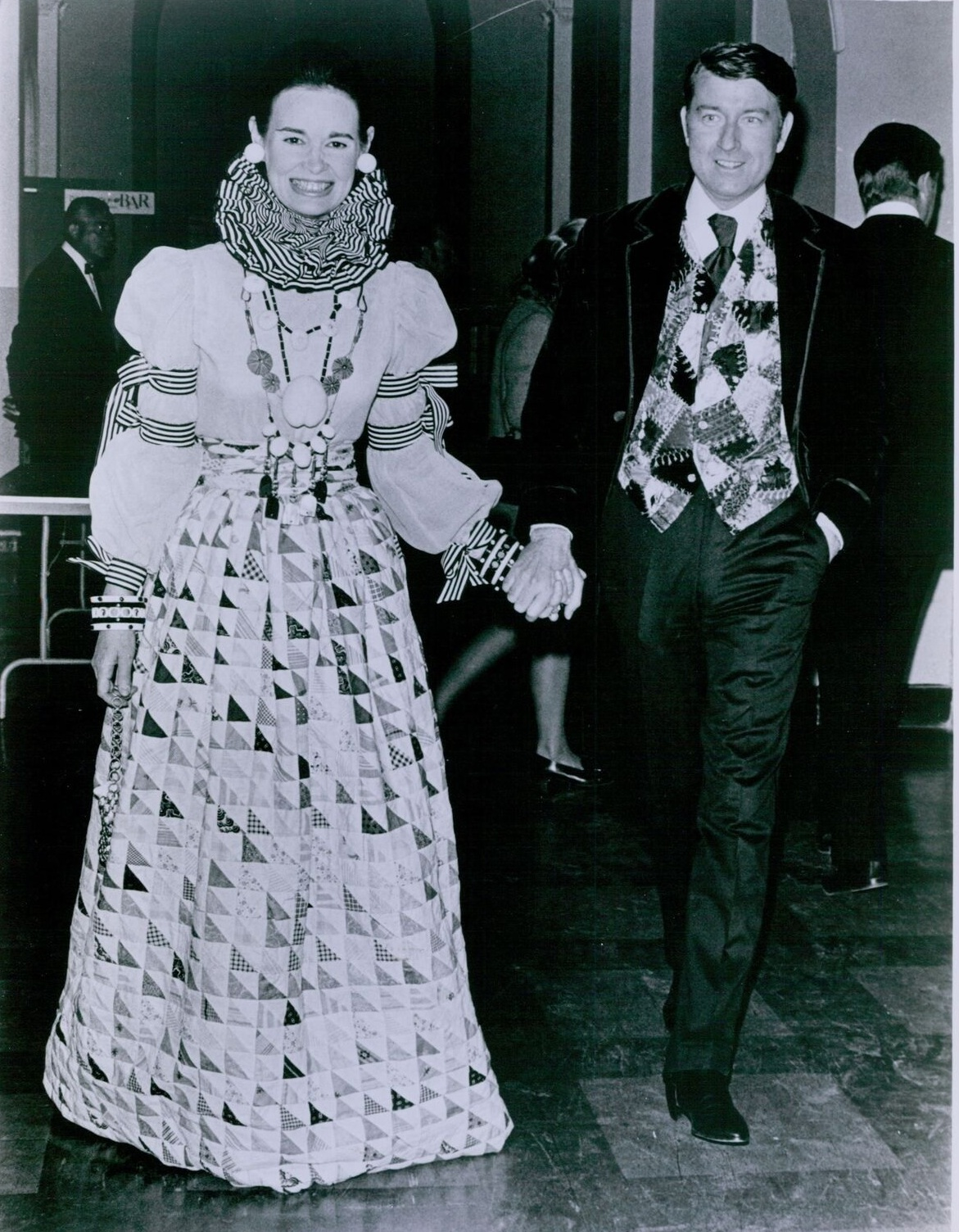
Gloria Vanderbilt and Wyatt Emory Cooper, 1970. She is wearing a 1967 Adolfo dress made from an antique quilt, now in the V&A Museum.

With financial help from Bill Blass, Adolfo opened his first salon in New York in 1963, where he met many of the customers who would become his patrons when he gave up millinery to focus on clothing. He had met the Duchess of Windsor by 1965, through whom he met regular customers Betsy Bloomingdale, Babe Paley and Nancy Reagan. Adolfo would go on to become good friends with Reagan, and not only designed her dresses for both of her husband's inaugurations, but many dresses she wore during her time as the First Lady. After Mainbocher retired, one of his highest-profile clients, C. Z. Guest, came to Adolfo to make her clothes instead. Adolfo's clothes were designed to complement his hats, which the designer saw as an optional accessory rather than a wardrobe essential.

At first Adolfo's extravagant, elaborately ornamental clothing seemed at odds with the relaxed principles behind American sportswear. He created individually beautiful garments designed to be worn together or separately, commenting in 1968 that "one has to dress in bits and pieces — the more the merrier." His 1960s "fun and fantasy" looks included richly embellished bolero jackets, organdy blouses, and evening ensembles made from antique patchwork quilts which were worn by the likes of Gloria Vanderbilt. In 1969 Adolfo won another Coty Award. That year, he claimed that classic clothing no longer appealed to the consumer, but soon afterwards, drastically changed his design approach to offer quietly understated clothing such as fur-trimmed knitwear, pyjama suits and ballgown skirts paired with sweaters. He started selling knitted dresses to the department stores Saks Fifth Avenue and Neiman Marcus.

In the summer of 1966 Adolfo had returned to Chanel to serve another unpaid apprenticeship, and would openly acknowledge her influence on his work. Adolfo's "Chanel jackets" and knit daywear became best-selling designs from the early 1970s onwards, and a design signature throughout his career. In 1978 he launched Adolfo Menswear Inc. and Adolfo Scarves Inc, and in 1979, a perfume line.

Adolfo became a member of the Council of Fashion Designers of America in 1982.

In 1993, at the age of 70, Adolfo decided to retire from fashion design and rely on the income from his licensing agreements with various manufacturers. Licensed Adolfo merchandise, including menswear, hats and accessories, luggage, sportswear, furs and perfume, was retailed widely at all consumer levels from Bloomingdale's through to J. C. Penney and the television shopping network QVC. In 1993, Adolfo's licensing agreements for perfume sales alone had a wholesale return of over 5 million dollars. By 2014, Adolfo was once again designing for his ready-to-wear clothing lines.

== Personal life ==
His partner, Edward C. Perry, died in 1993 from esophageal cancer.

Adolfo died on November 27, 2021, in his Manhattan home. He was 98 years old at the time of his death. He was buried in Restland Memorial Park in East Hanover, New Jersey.
