= Erik Braagaard =

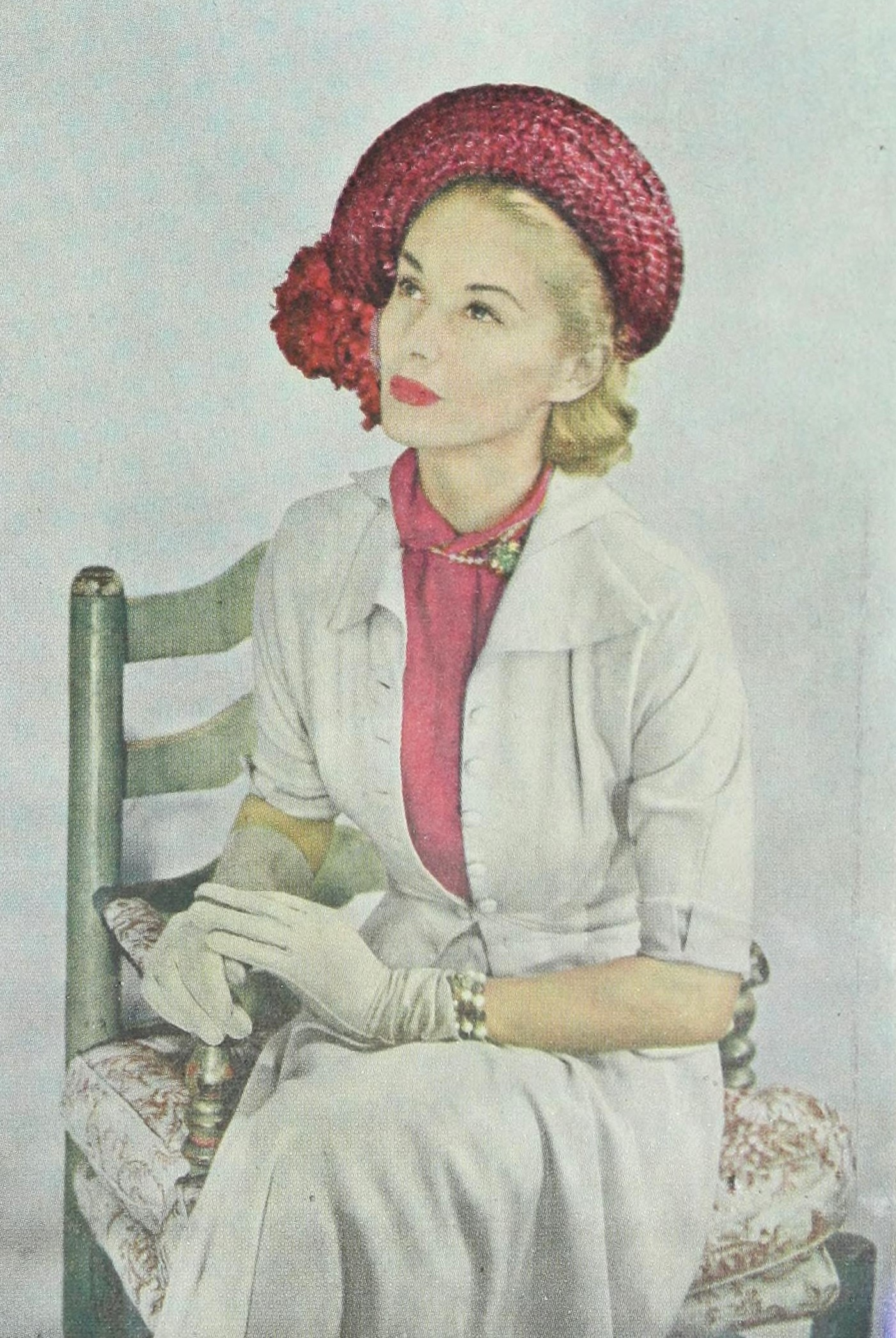
Model wearing a Braagaard hat, 1948, Ladies' Home Journal

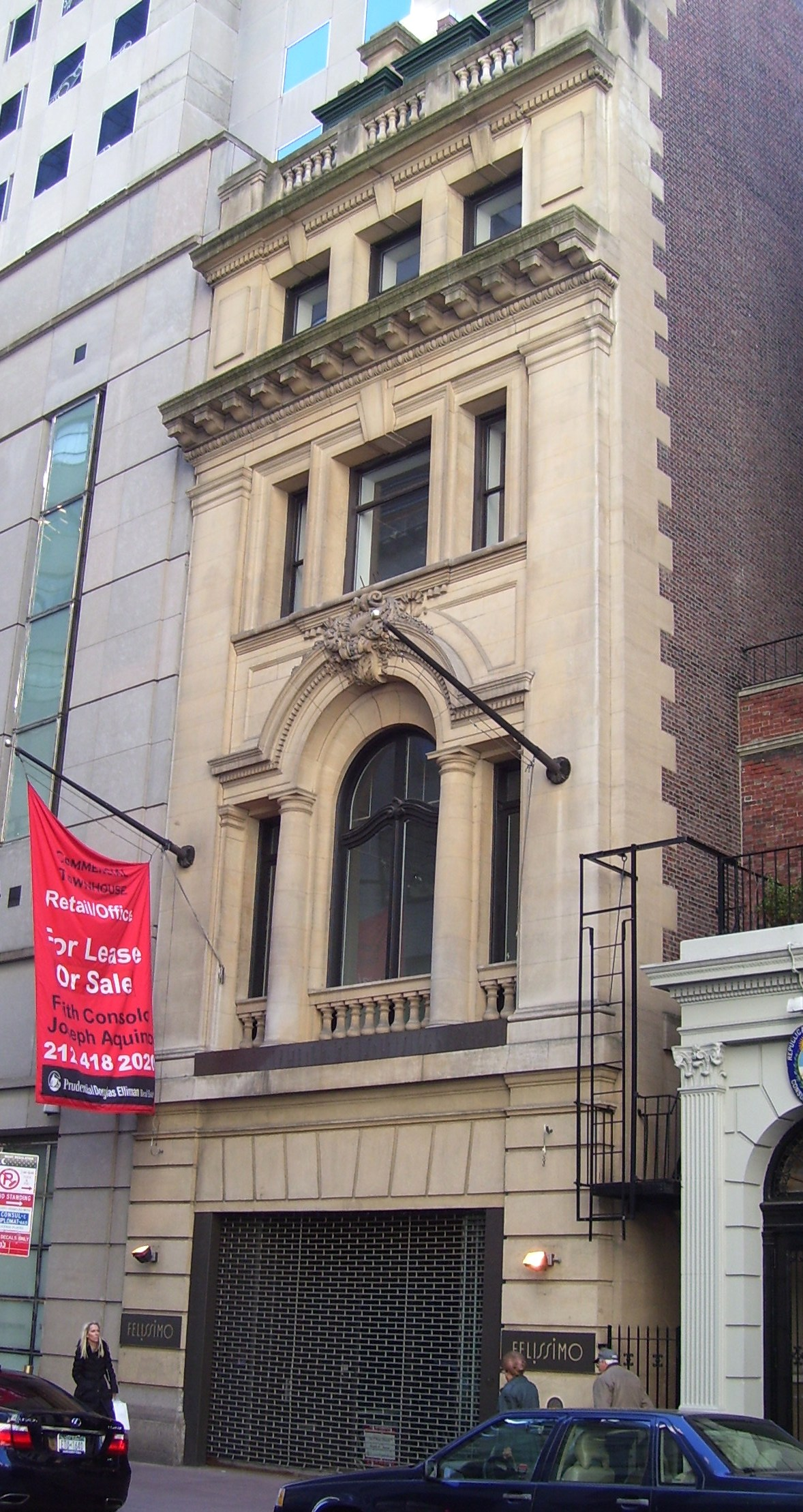
10 West 56th Street in 2011 (Erik store on the ground floor by 1949)

Karl Erik Braagaard (24 Aug 1912 – 25 May 2004) was a Danish-born American milliner, who had Erik stores in Paris, New York and London from the 1930s to 1950s.

Braagaard was born in Copenhagen on 24 August 1912, the son of Georg and Mary Braagaard.

By 1949, he had a showroom at 10 West 56th Street in New York City.

Adolfo Sardiña (1933–2021) worked as a designer for Braagaard in the early 1950s, before joining Emme as head designer in 1953. The fashion designer Mary Quant began her career as an apprentice milliner for Erik in London's Brook Street in 1955.

His work is in the permanent collection of the Victoria and Albert Museum, London, including a c. 1941 hat made in New York City for Marie Cecile Wooster, the daughter of Baron Gustav Von Springer, who was married to Baron Eugene Fould. The Metropolitan Museum of Art holds at least three hats, dating from 1938, 1940 and 1950.

Braagaard died in New York City on 25 May 2004.
