= 30 West 56th Street =

Building in Manhattan, New York

Henry Seligman Residence
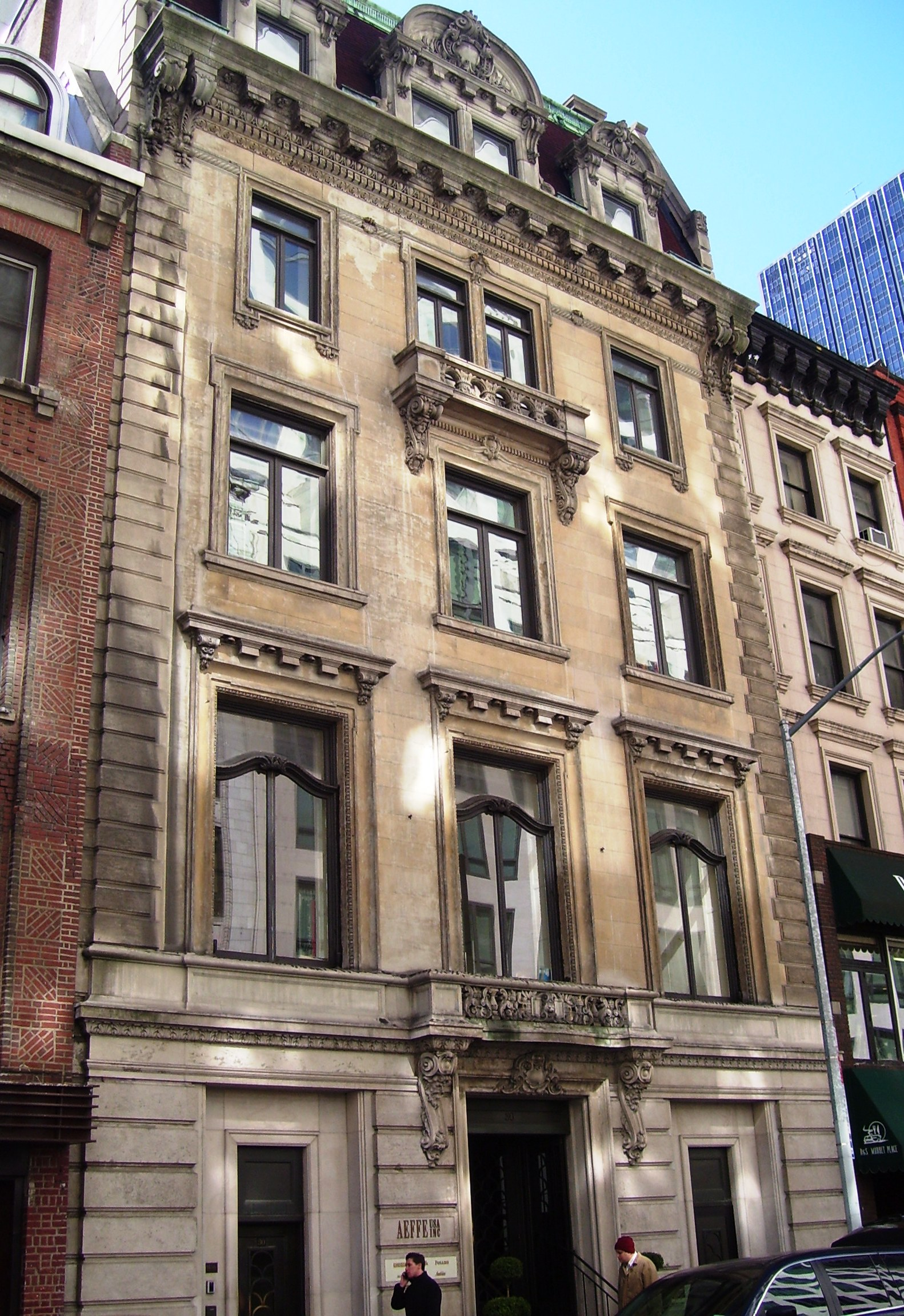
- The house as seen in March 2011
- Interactive map of the Henry Seligman Residence area

General information
- Location: 30 West 56th Street, Manhattan, New York, US
- Coordinates: 40°45′46.0″N 73°58′34.2″W
- Construction started: 1899
- Completed: 1901
- Client: Henry Seligman
- Landlord: Pierluigi Tortora

Technical details
- Floor count: 6

Design and construction
- Architect: C. P. H. Gilbert

New York City Landmark
- Designated: July 24, 2007
- Reference no.: 2227

30 West 56th Street (originally the Henry Seligman Residence) is a building in the Midtown Manhattan neighborhood of New York City. It is along 56th Street's southern sidewalk between Fifth Avenue and Sixth Avenue. The five-story building was designed by C. P. H. Gilbert in the French Renaissance Revival style. It was constructed between 1899 and 1901 as a private residence, one of several on 56th Street's "Bankers' Row".

The main facade is largely clad with limestone, while the side facades are clad with brick and have limestone quoins. It is divided vertically into three bays. The ground story contains three openings within a wall of rusticated blocks; the center opening was the original main entrance. The second floor contains wood-framed windows and the third and fourth stories have window openings containing three panes; there are ornamental balconettes at the second and fourth stories. A cornice and mansard roof rises above the fourth floor. The interior was ornately decorated, with a marble reception hall, Japanese-style smoking room, and Gothic style library.

The house was commissioned for banker Henry Seligman, of J. & W. Seligman & Co., and his wife Adelaide. The couple was involved in numerous clubs and organizations and hosted events at the house until they both died in the early 1930s. Afterward, the house was leased to the Beethoven Association in 1934 and divided into apartments in 1941. The ground floor housed numerous restaurants starting in 1940, and modifications were made to the building in subsequent years. In 1994 it was purchased by Alberta Ferretti's firm Aeffe USA, which moved into the building in 1996. The New York City Landmarks Preservation Commission designated the house as an official landmark in 2007. Pierluigi Tortora bought the building in 2025.

== Site ==
30 West 56th Street is in the Midtown Manhattan neighborhood of New York City. It is along the southern sidewalk of 56th Street between Fifth Avenue and Sixth Avenue. The land lot is slightly irregular and covers 4,350 square feet (404 m^{2}), with a frontage of 41 feet (12 m) and a maximum depth of 110 feet (34 m). The house was built by combining two rectangular lots: one at 30 West 56th Street to the east, measuring 16 by 100 feet (4.9 by 30.5 m), and one at 32 West 56th Street to the west, measuring 25 by 110 feet (7.6 by 33.5 m). The building is on the same block as the townhouses at 10, 12, and 26 West 56th Street, as well as the skyscraper at 712 Fifth Avenue and the Fifth Avenue Presbyterian Church, all to the east. Other nearby buildings include The Peninsula New York hotel and the University Club of New York to the southeast; the Rockefeller Apartments to the south; 46 West 55th Street to the southwest; and 17 West 56th Street and the Crown Building to the northeast.

Fifth Avenue between 42nd Street and Central Park South (59th Street) was relatively undeveloped through the late 19th century. The surrounding area was once part of the common lands of the city of New York. The Commissioners' Plan of 1811 established Manhattan's street grid with lots measuring 100 feet (30 m) deep and 25 feet (7.6 m) wide. Upscale residences were constructed around Fifth Avenue following the American Civil War. The block of 56th Street from Fifth to Sixth Avenue contained rowhouses by 1871, many of which were recessed from the lot line and had entrance stoops. By the end of the 19th century, the area had many wealthy residents, and the houses in the area were either modified or rebuilt altogether. The adjacent block of 56th Street was developing into a "bankers' row", with the residences of Frederick C. Edey at number 10, H. B. Hollins at number 12, Edward Wasserman at number 33, and Arthur Lehman at number 31. Many of these houses persisted through the mid-20th century as part of a restaurant and retail strip.

== Architecture ==
The Seligman House at 30 West 56th Street was designed by C. P. H. Gilbert in the Renaissance Revival style. It was constructed by Harvey Murdock. The building is five stories tall. The facade is divided horizontally into three sections, and the windows on upper stories are progressively smaller, using forced perspective to create an illusion of a larger house. In front of the entrances on 56th Street is a cement yard with fire standpipes and a metal grill.

=== Facade ===
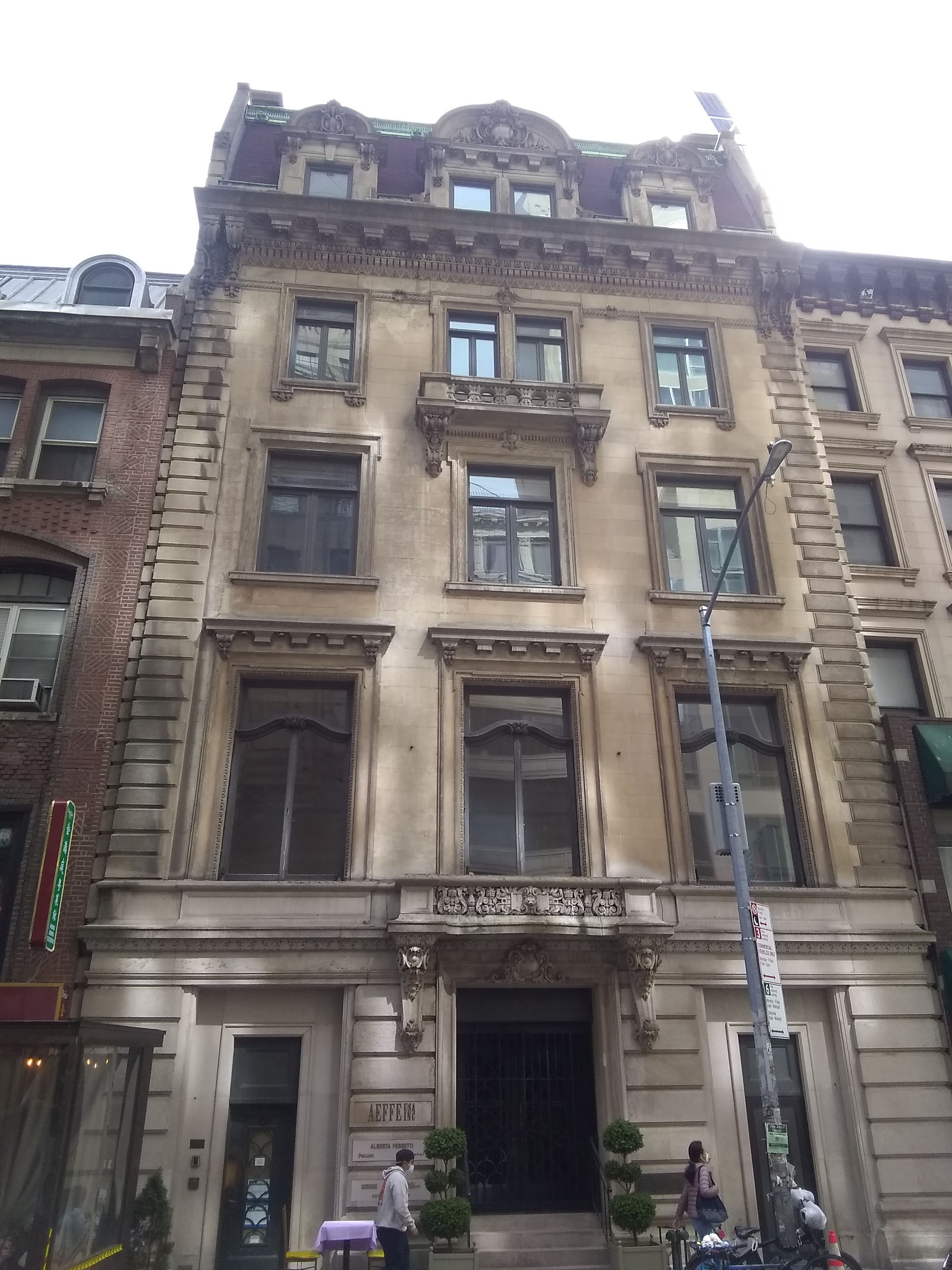
Seen in 2021

The 56th Street facade is divided vertically into three bays. The first floor is clad with rusticated blocks of limestone and has three recessed doorways. The left and right doorways (respectively on the east and west) contain metal-and-glass doors with cast-stone frames. The central doorway is surrounded by a limestone frame and contains a short stoop with iron railings. In the original design, there was a stoop with three steps. The current stoop, which is not original, leads up to a sliding metal gate, behind which is a metal and glass door. Above the doorway is a decorative lintel with a cartouche. A belt course with acanthus-leaf decorations runs above the entire first story. Atop the belt course, over the center doorway, is a projecting second-story balconette with a lion head motif at the middle, as well as acanthus leaves and torches separated by balusters. Above the left and right doorways are plain stone panels.

The other stories on 56th Street are clad with limestone, which is mostly smooth except for quoin blocks on the extreme left and right sides. The second-floor window openings consist of wood-framed windows surrounded by inwardly curved limestone moldings with egg-and-dart motifs. Each second-story window has three panes: a pair of "bowed arched" panes at the bottom beneath a transom pane. The individual lintels above each window contain consoles, modillions, and rosettes. The third and fourth stories are surrounded by limestone. They were designed as wooden sash windows, which were replaced with casement windows beneath a transom. Above the center window on the third story is a cartouche and two brackets supporting an ornamental balconette with balusters, acanthus leaves, and beads. The center window at the fourth story is designed with two pairs of casement windows and two transoms, one on each side of a vertical limestone mullion that has a cartouche above it. Above the fourth story is a modillioned cornice with consoles on the far left and right.

The mansard roof is covered with asphalt shingles but was originally clad with tile. Three segmental-arched dormers protrude from the roof on 56th Street. The left and right dormers each have one window, while the center dormer has two, one on each side of a vertical limestone mullion. The center dormer has an entablature above the windows, with consoles, modillions, and rosettes. Above the entablature of the center dormer, as well as the windows in the left and right dormers, are ornamental cartouches with leaf branches on either side. The top of the roof has copper trim and motifs of lion heads. On either end of the roof are chimneys with limestone caps and limestone parapet walls.

There are party walls on both the east and west sides of the house, which are concealed by adjacent buildings beneath the fourth story. The visible portions of the party walls are clad with brick and have limestone quoins at the northern corner of the wall. Portions of the chimneys can also be seen on both walls.

=== Interior ===
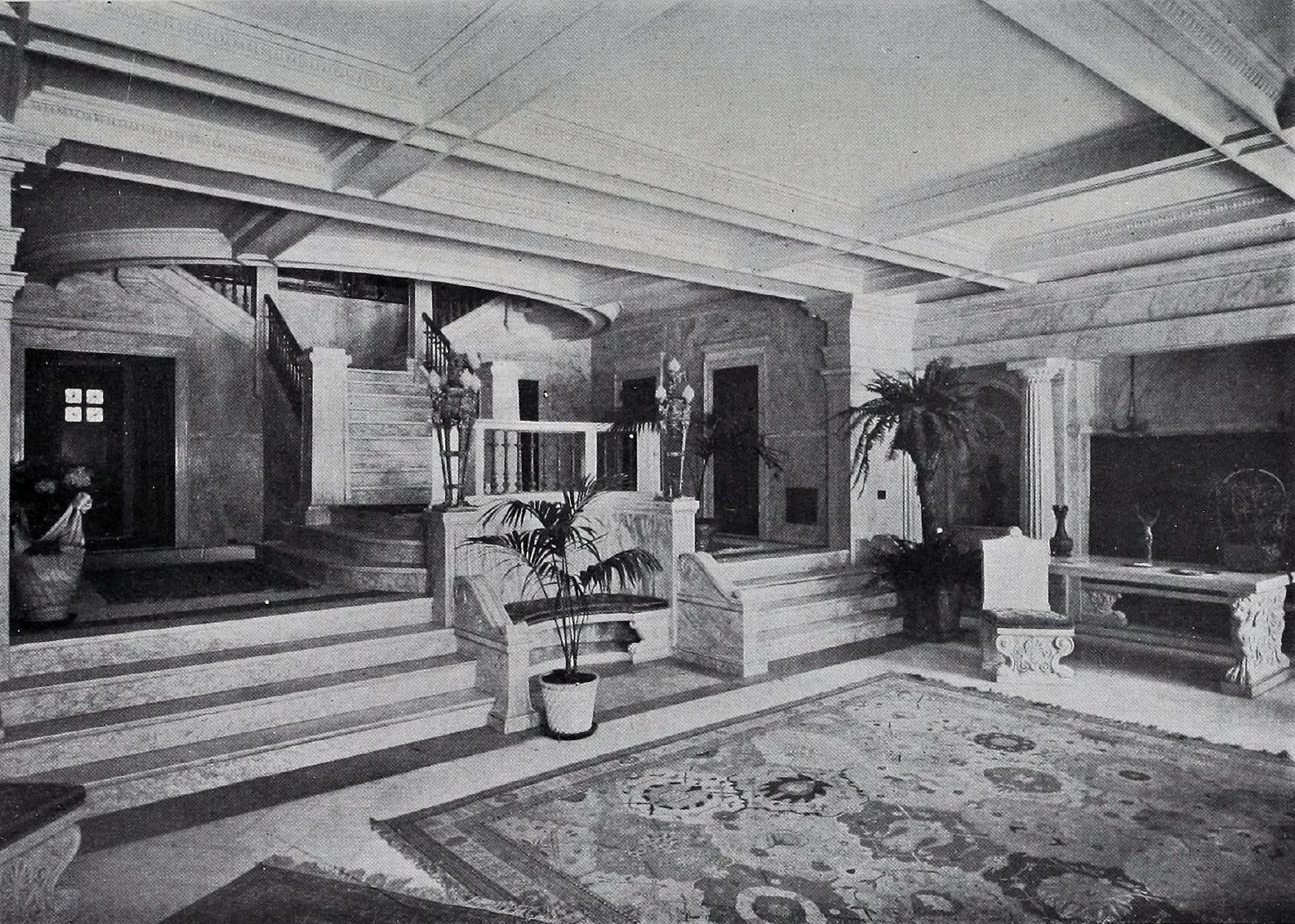
Photograph of original entrance hallway with double-flight staircase

Inside the main entrance was an entrance hall measuring 30 feet (9 m) deep and 40 feet (12 m) wide. The ceilings, walls, floors, and even the furniture and fireplaces were made of green marble; at the far end of the reception room were separate dressing and toilet rooms for male and female guests. The hall led to a double-flight staircase connecting with the second floor, which in turn led to a space that was lit by a skylight at the roof. The stairs were largely for decoration, as the house was equipped from the outset with an electric elevator.

The other rooms had various styles. The second floor had a drawing room at the front and a dining room in the rear, which was separated by the central hall and stairs. Behind the dining room, at the back of the lot, were two extensions around a private court, with the butler's pantry on one side and a smoking room on the other. The smoking room was designed in a Japanese style. At the front of the third floor was a private library designed in the Gothic style, with a ceiling, doors, and furniture designed in that style. This design extended even to the wastebasket. The rear of the third floor was used for the bedrooms, boudoir, and private bedrooms of the Seligman family. The rear of the fourth and fifth floors also contained private bedrooms.

The original interiors had been modified in the mid-20th century but were restored to nearly their original condition during a 1990s renovation. After that renovation, the second floor had a terrazzo floor with a yin and yang motif outside the elevator, as well as a full-height fireplace in one room and double-height windows in another room. The third floor contained a marble fireplace, glass chandeliers, and a wood floor. On that floor, the offices of the Italian designers had a molded plaster ceiling that was reproduced from the original design. The fourth and fifth floors had similar decorations, but slightly different designs were created for the showrooms on either floor.

== History ==
The house was commissioned for Henry Seligman, a prominent banker. He was born in 1857 and his father and uncles had cofounded the banking firm J. & W. Seligman & Co. in Lower Manhattan in 1864. The company also developed branches around the world, though these branches had become independent by the 1890s. The Seligman family was a prominent German- and Jewish-American family during the late 19th century and was nicknamed the "American Rothschilds". In March 1899, Henry Seligman married 40-year-old Adelaide Walter, who went by the nickname "Addie" and had previously been married to Henry's cousin David.

=== Seligman residence ===
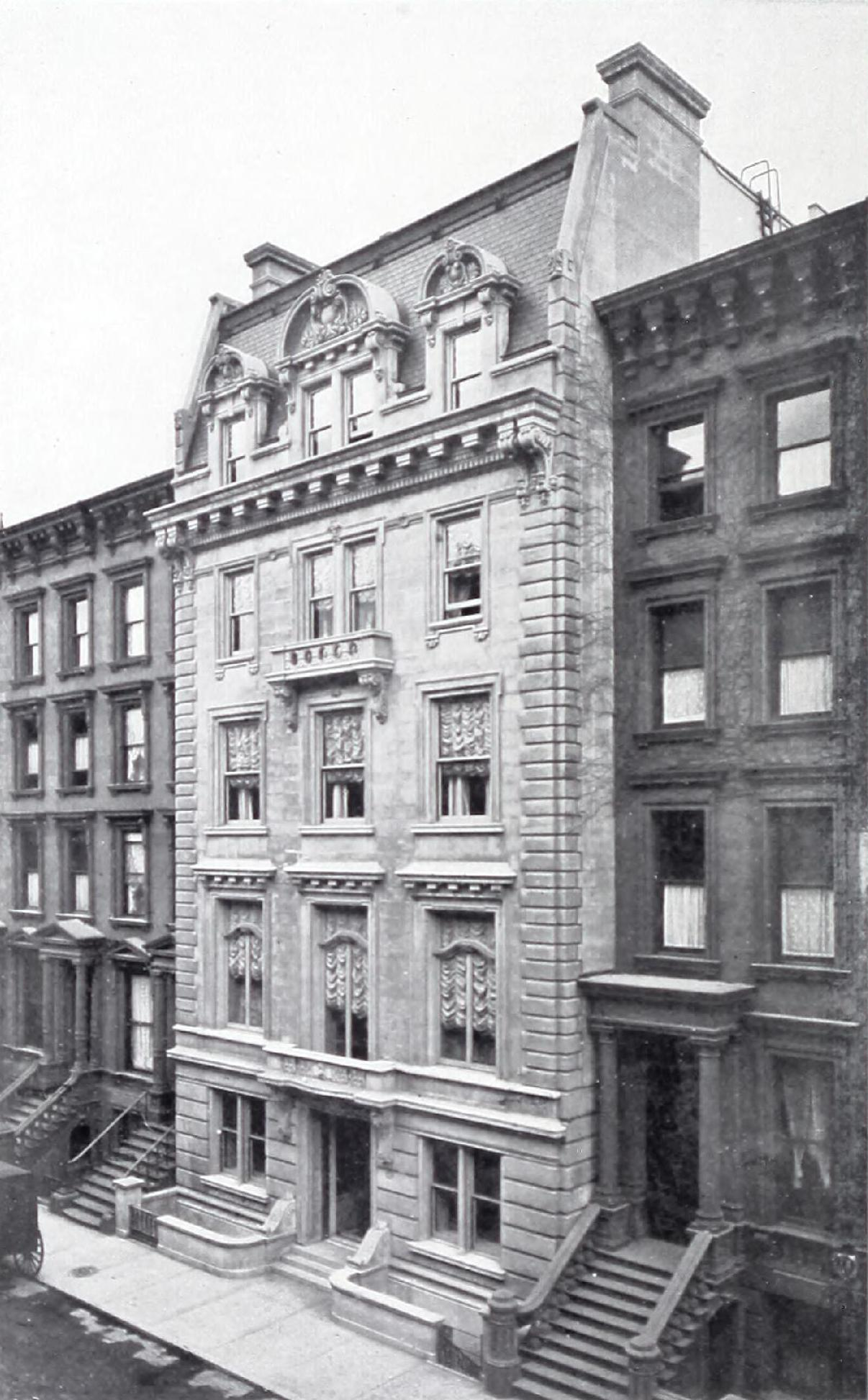
As depicted in 1902

In September 1899, Henry Seligman bought two four-story rowhouses at 30 and 32 West 56th Street from James Lenox Banks and Mrs. Sheppard Knapp, respectively. He planned to build a new residence on the site. Seligman took title to the rowhouses that October and demolished the structures two months later. Seligman hired C. P. H. Gilbert to design his house. At the time, many wealthy residents around Fifth Avenue in Midtown were commissioning New York City's top architects to design their houses. Fewer private dwellings were being constructed in Manhattan, and such dwellings were increasingly being constructed for wealthy individuals. According to Herbert Croly, there were one-sixth as many private houses being constructed in the borough in 1902 compared to in 1892, and average costs for individual houses had increased fourfold over that period. By September 1901, the house had been completed. The Seligman house had cost $200,000 (equivalent to $7,740,000 in 2025), while the average for comparable houses was $136,000 less (equivalent to $5,263,200 in 2025).

The family held a housewarming party in January 1902, their first major event at the house, in which the Mannes Quartet held a performance on the second floor. The Seligman couple's children Gladys, Rhoda, and Walter lived in the house, as did various waitstaff. Gladys's marriage to Henry P. Wertheim took place at the house in 1905, as did Rhoda's marriage to Frederick Lewissohn in 1907. Henry Seligman was involved in numerous clubs and Republican Party politics. Addie Seligman was also involved in the leadership of various clubs and societies, including the St. Cecilia Club musical organization, the Mount Sinai Training School for Nurses, and political organizations. She held various events at the house for these clubs. In the 1910s, these included a speech for a group opposed to women's suffrage, a dinner in which New York governor Charles Seymour Whitman was a guest, and a contract bridge party to raise money for the YMCA. The family also constructed houses at Elberon, New Jersey, and Palm Beach, Florida, which were respectively used as summer and winter homes.

After World War I, the surrounding neighborhood was rapidly becoming a commercial zone, and many neighboring townhouses were converted to commercial use. The Seligman residence was one of the major exceptions to this trend, and the couple continued to live there until their respective deaths. The house was renovated in 1923. The side entrances had originally contained service stairways, but these were removed. In addition, the windows were replaced. The Seligman couple continued to host events, such as the receptions they gave each December before they left for their Palm Beach house, some of which were accompanied by musical programs and special guests. The annual December receptions ended when Henry Seligman died of a heart attack at his 56th Street home on December 23, 1933. His funeral took place four days later on the second floor. Addie Seligman, who had been ill for several weeks at the time of her husband's death, died a month later on January 31, 1934.

=== Mid-20th century ===
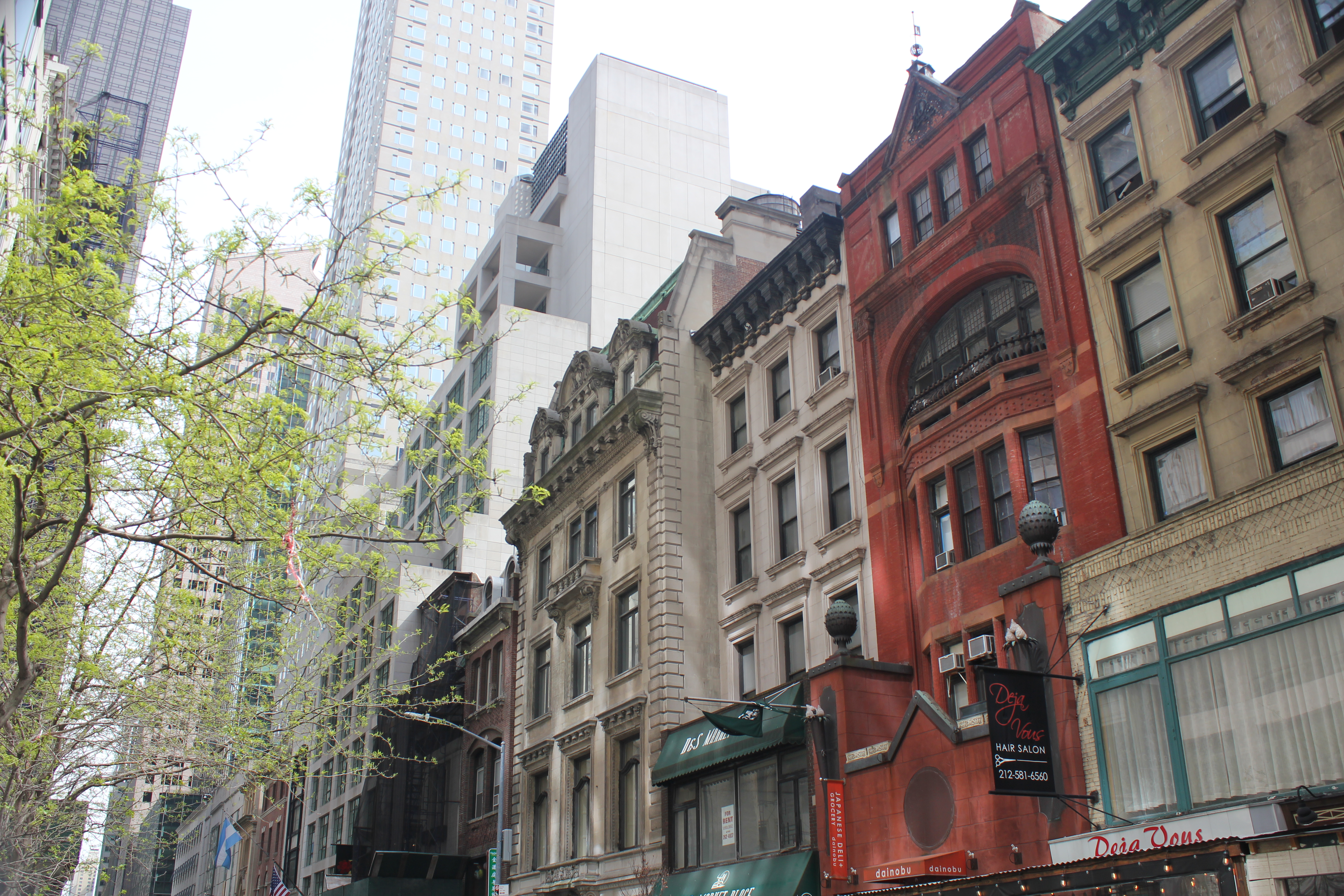
Looking east at the nearby restaurant row, with 30 West 56th Street at center left

Adelaide Seligman's estate auctioned the furniture and tableware in April 1934; the dinner plates alone netted $2,660.92 (equivalent to $64,040.8 in 2025). The Beethoven Association rented the house the same month for use as its new headquarters. Early that June, the association opened its new quarters with a housewarming party. Adelaide Seligman's estate sold the house in February 1935 to politician Joseph L. Buttenwieser, for about $77,500 (equivalent to $1,819,933.25 in 2025), while the house was still under lease to the Beethoven Association. According to the New York City Landmarks Preservation Commission (LPC), Buttenwieser did not live in the house and only owned it for investment purposes. Throughout the Beethoven Association's occupancy, the house hosted events such as meetings for the American Musicological Society, as well as benefit concerts. The house was renovated in 1939 for private clubhouse usage. In March 1940, the Beethoven Association moved out of the house, and the association disbanded two months later.

Arthur D. Kunze acquired the house in May 1941. At the time, it was occupied by the Horizon Club, described in The New York Times as "a social organization composed of Russians". The ground floor was also occupied by Camillo Restaurant, which moved into the space in 1940. After acquiring the house, Kunze renovated the upper stories into residential apartments, which became home to various garment industry workers, actors, musicians, and singers. The house was recorded as having 14 apartments when it was sold in January 1946 to David S, Meister at an assessed value of $135,000 (equivalent to $2,228,882 in 2025). By July 1947, a restaurant named Leslie House had opened within the building. Monaco Restaurant opened in the house in 1949. The light court in the rear was enclosed the next year, at which point the ground floor was occupied by Blair House Restaurant. The restaurant's owner, Nickey Blair, hired Russell Patterson to redesign the restaurant interior, with the hope that the design and cuisine would attract guests.

=== Late 20th century to present ===
By 1964, the restaurant space was occupied by Korean restaurant Arirang House. Romeo Salta took over the restaurant space in 1971 for his own Italian restaurant. The restaurant had relocated from another address on the same block, which it had occupied for nearly two decades previously. With its relocation to 30 West 56th Street, Salta was able to expand its space. Another portion of the house was taken up by Alex & Walter, a gymnastics club, by the mid-1980s. Around the same time, Italian clothing manufacturer Cerruti 1881 also had a store in the building. The block's restaurant row declined in the two decades following the mid-1970s. Romeo Salta moved out of the house in 1994.

Zingarella Realty Corp sold the house in 1994 to Aeffe USA Inc, a fashion company operated by Alberta Ferretti. The new tenant, Fashion Service USA, chose the house because it contained enough space for meetings and a showroom. The company planned to restore the space to its original condition; at the time, the rooms were mostly unchanged, but the center staircase had been demolished. During the next two years, the house was renovated into a series of showrooms. The second floor contained space for the collections of Italian fashion house Moschino, while the third through fifth floors had the respective showrooms of Alberta Ferretti, Jean Paul Gaultier, and Rifat Ozbek. On July 24, 2007, the New York City Landmarks Preservation Commission designated the former Seligman residence at 30 West 56th Street as a city landmark, along with the Frederick C. Edey residence at 10 West 56th Street. The Seligman house was transferred to Ferrim USA Inc in 2012 for $13.35 million. Aeffe USA then leased the building from Ferrim USA for 15 years, paying $900,000 a year. By the 2020s, Aeffe USA planned to relocate its showroom into a smaller space in Tribeca. Pierluigi Tortora bought the building in May 2025 for around $22.5 million.

== See also ==
- List of New York City Designated Landmarks in Manhattan from 14th to 59th Streets
