= 10 West 56th Street =

Building in Manhattan, New York

Frederick C. and Birdsall Otis Edey Residence
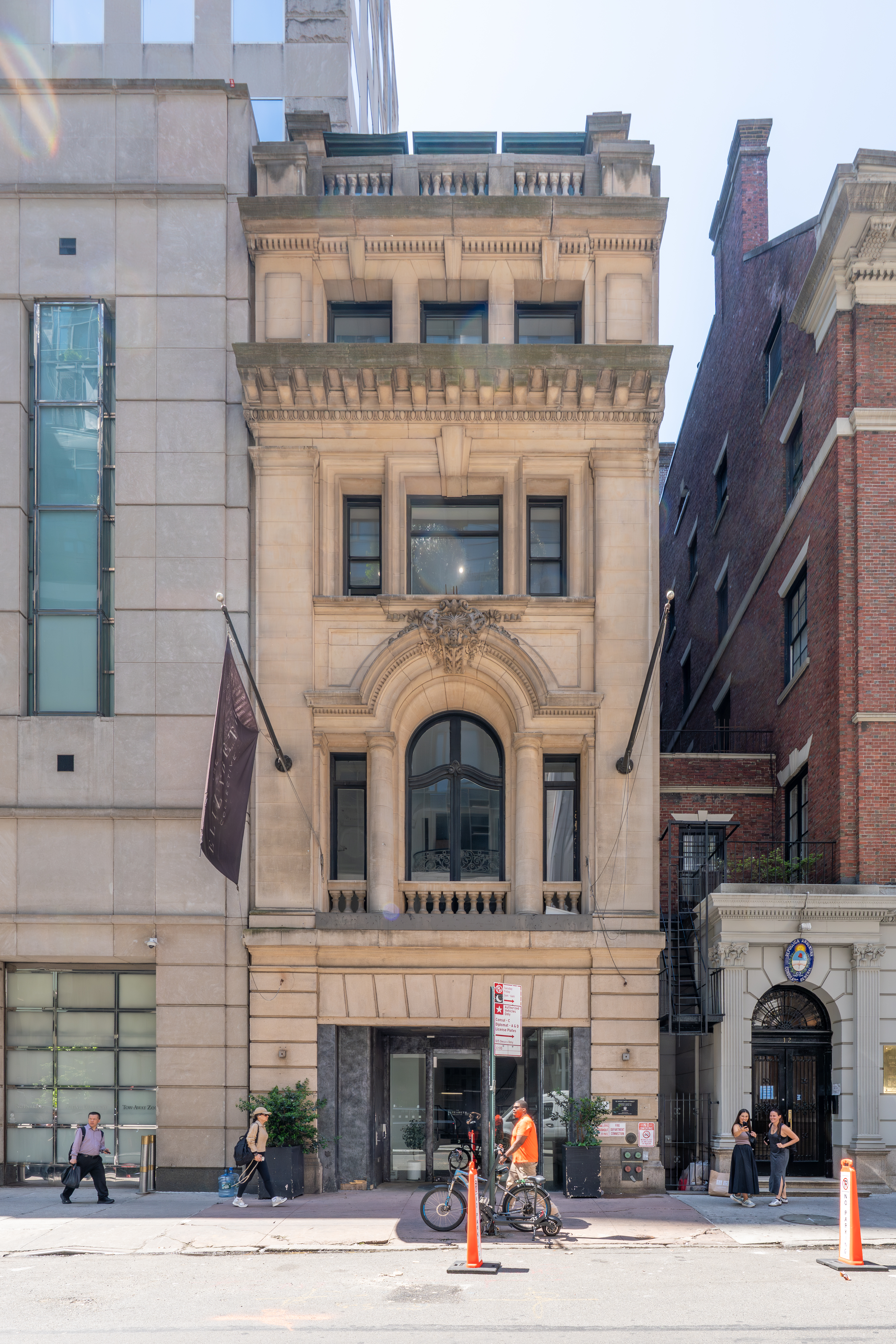
- In May 2026

General information
- Architectural style: French Renaissance Revival
- Location: 10 West 56th Street, Manhattan, New York, US
- Coordinates: 40°45′45″N 73°58′31″W
- Current tenants: The Elizabeth Collective
- Construction started: 1901
- Completed: 1903
- Client: Frederick C. and Birdsall Otis Edey
- Owner: Carlos Slim

Technical details
- Floor count: 6

Design and construction
- Architect: Warren and Wetmore

New York City Landmark
- Designated: July 24, 2007
- Reference no.: 2226

10 West 56th Street (originally the Frederick C. and Birdsall Otis Edey Residence) is a commercial building in the Midtown Manhattan neighborhood of New York City. It is along 56th Street's southern sidewalk between Fifth Avenue and Sixth Avenue. The six-story building was designed by Warren and Wetmore in the French Renaissance Revival style. It was constructed in 1901 as a private residence, one of several on 56th Street's "Bankers' Row".

The main facade is largely clad with limestone, while the side facades are clad with brick and have limestone quoins. The ground story contains a glass storefront with rusticated molded-concrete piers. The second floor contains an arched Palladian window while the third and fourth stories have tripartite windows. A mansard roof rises above the fourth floor. According to the New York City Department of City Planning, the house has 16,446 square feet (1,527.9 m^{2}) inside.

The house was commissioned for stockbroker Frederick C. Edey and his wife Birdsall Otis Edey in 1899. The couple had initially planned to design their house alongside their neighbor H. B. Hollins, at 12 West 56th Street, but a covenant prevented the Edey house from being built for two years. The Edeys occupied the house until 1919, when the Frangold Realty Company bought it and added a sixth story. Over the following years, it was used largely for commercial purposes, though Elizabeth Taylor also lived at the house in the mid-1950s. The New York City Landmarks Preservation Commission designated the house as an official landmark in 2007. The house has been owned by billionaire Carlos Slim since 2011.

== Site ==
10 West 56th Street is in the Midtown Manhattan neighborhood of New York City. It is along the southern sidewalk of 56th Street between Fifth Avenue and Sixth Avenue. The land lot is rectangular and covers 2,500 square feet (230 m^{2}), with a frontage of 25 feet (7.6 m) on 56th Street and a depth of 100 feet (30 m). The building is on the same block as the 712 Fifth Avenue skyscraper to the east; the Fifth Avenue Presbyterian Church to the southeast; and the townhouses at 12, 26, and 30 West 56th Street to the west. Other nearby buildings include The Peninsula New York hotel, the University Club of New York, and the Rockefeller Apartments to the south; the Corning Glass Building to the east; Trump Tower to the northeast; and 17 West 56th Street and the Crown Building to the north.

Fifth Avenue between 42nd Street and Central Park South (59th Street) was relatively undeveloped through the late 19th century. The surrounding area was once part of the common lands of the city of New York. The Commissioners' Plan of 1811 established Manhattan's street grid with lots measuring 100 feet (30 m) deep and 25 feet (7.6 m) wide. Upscale residences were constructed around Fifth Avenue following the American Civil War. The block of 56th Street from Fifth to Sixth Avenue contained rowhouses by 1871, many of which were recessed from the lot line and had entrance stoops. By the end of the 19th century, the area had many wealthy residents, and the houses in the area were either modified or rebuilt altogether. The adjacent block of 56th Street was developing into a "bankers' row", with the residences of H. B. Hollins at number 12, Henry Seligman at number 30, Edward Wasserman at number 33, and Arthur Lehman at number 31. Many of these houses persisted through the mid-20th century as part of a restaurant and retail strip.

== Architecture ==
The Edey House at 10 West 56th Street was designed by Warren and Wetmore in the French Renaissance Revival style with some Beaux-Arts design elements. (Note: 12 West 56th Street, later the Argentinian Consulate General to New York City, was designed by McKim, Mead & White in the Federal Georgian Revival style.) The building is six stories tall with a roofline about 84 feet (26 m) above the sidewalk. The facade is divided horizontally into three sections, with the middle stories being emphasized, a common trait in French Renaissance Revival structures.

10 West 56th Street was planned and constructed nearly simultaneously with the house of H. B. Hollins at 12 West 56th Street. However, because of a covenant that temporarily halted construction at number 10, they were designed in different styles by different firms. Of the houses' contrasting designs, Christopher Gray wrote for The New York Times in 2007: "The two houses are paired in an uneasy dance, one doing the cancan, the other a minuet." According to architectural writer Robert A. M. Stern, number 10 seemed "uncharacteristically stiff" when compared to the Hollins residence at number 12 and the brownstone at number 8.

=== Facade ===
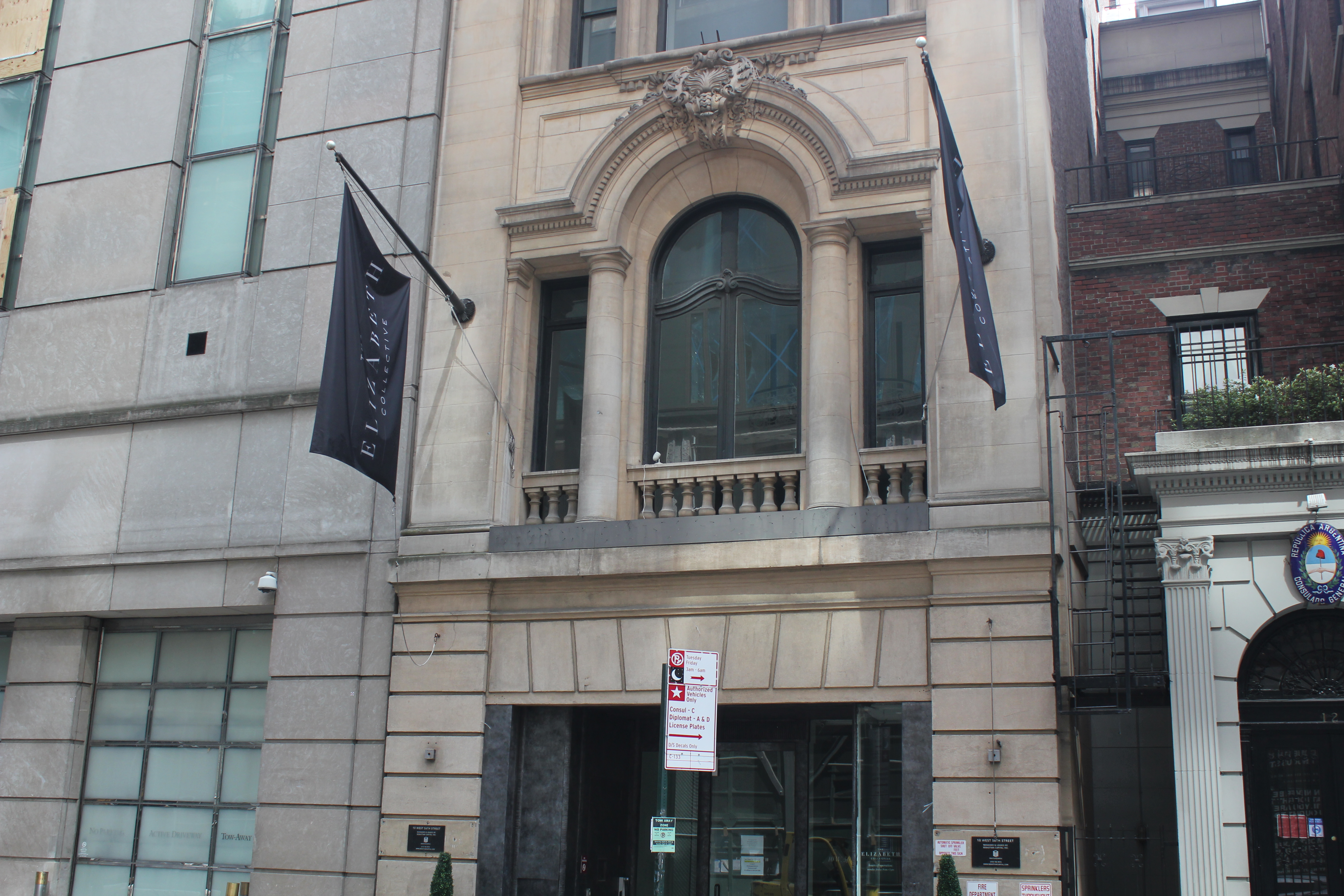
Modified commercial base, with second-story Palladian window above

The 56th Street facade is extended to the lot line boundary. The ground story contains a recessed rectangular storefront with a center glass door and two metal-framed windows alongside it. The storefront is flanked by rusticated vertical piers, which are made of molded concrete. The modern storefront has a service doorway on the left, or east, of the main doorway. Originally, the ground story contained two bulls-eye windows, one on each side of the main entrance.

Above the first floor, the 56th Street facade is flanked by Tuscan-style pilasters. The second story has a balustrade, as well as a Palladian window, which is composed of three panes separated by two engaged columns. The center pane of the Palladian window is a round-arched opening with an ornate scrolled cartouche and keystone above it. A dentil course runs above the Palladian window. The third floor has a tripartite window; the center pane is larger than the two outer panes and is topped by a keystone. A molded sill course and a cornice with modillions runs above the entire third floor, interrupting the pilasters. The fourth floor also has a tripartite window, but the panes are all the same size and are topped by keystones. Above the fourth floor is a balustrade, as well as a copper mansard roof with three dormer windows. The roof has chimneys and parapets.

The east facade is entirely blocked by the 712 Fifth Avenue skyscraper. The west facade is clad with brick and has limestone quoins at the northern corner of the wall. There are window openings with limestone window sills and lintels above the second floor. The first and second floors, which face 12 West 56th Street, are subject to a party wall agreement and lack windows. The east facade of 10 West 56th Street lacks ornate decoration, even though it had been developed nearly simultaneously with 12 West 56th Street, being separated from the latter house by a courtyard. This contrasted with the design of 12 West 56th Street, which had a wing facing the courtyard.

=== Interior ===
According to the New York City Department of City Planning, the house has 16,446 square feet (1,527.9 m^{2}). The interior of the house has a marble staircase. On the second story, a balcony overlooks the ground story. The decorative elements include Corinthian columns and decorative plasterwork, while the rear of the house has glass bay windows. As early as 1920, the house was recorded as having an elevator. There are also two basement stories.

The arrangement of the house has changed through the years. When the house was purchased by aviator Jacqueline Cochran in 1945, her cosmetic store had sales and reception on the first floor, a display room on the second floor, administrative offices on the third floor, and personnel and sales training on the fourth through sixth floors. When the house was bought in 1992 by Japanese mail-order company Felissimo, the interior was arranged according to feng shui principles. The first floor was remodeled as a conservatory selling garden products, the second floor sold clothing, the third floor sold living and dining room furnishings, and the fourth floor had a tearoom. As of 2010, the first through fourth floors were designed for retail use while the top stories were designed for office use.

== History ==
The house was commissioned for Frederick C. Edey, a stockbroker who initially worked for Charles C. Edey & Sons. From 1886 to 1892, he was a partner at the firm H. B. Hollins & Co. with H. B. Hollins; in subsequent years Edey went on to found several firms and join numerous gentlemen's clubs. Hollins and Edey commuted from Long Island to Midtown together, and their firm worked with J.P. Morgan & Co. In 1893, Frederick had married Sarah "Birdsall" Otis, the daughter of politician James Otis. Birdsall was a socialite who held numerous leadership positions in the Girl Scouts of the USA, various women's suffrage agencies, and poetry associations. The Edeys had one daughter, Julia, born in 1894. The Edeys also had a house in Long Island at Bellport, New York.

=== Residence ===
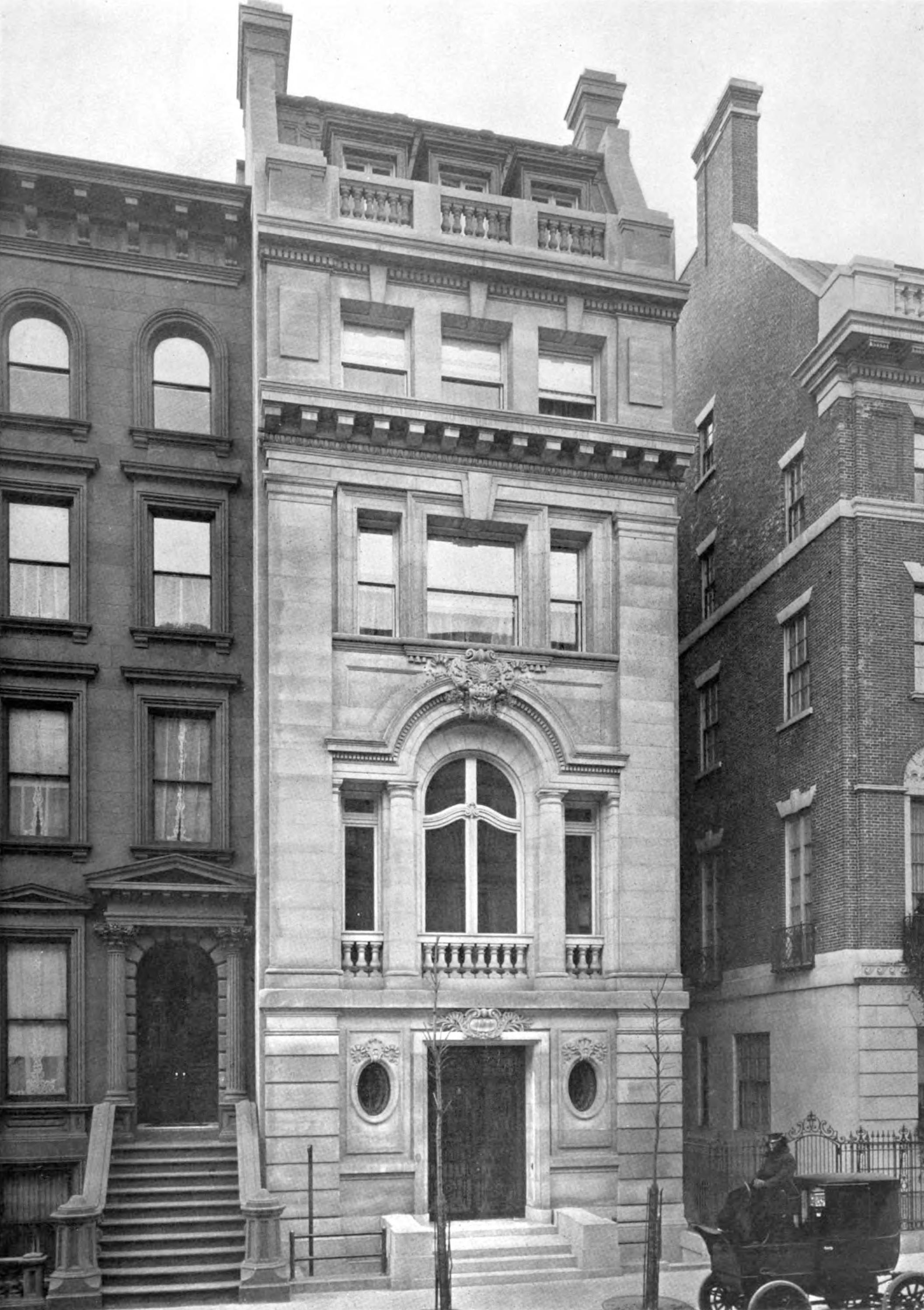
Original appearance of the house in 1903

In February 1899, Hollins bought a 75-by-100-foot (23 by 30 m) lot at 10-14 West 56th Street, on its southern sidewalk about 250 feet (76 m) west of Fifth Avenue. Hollins sold the easternmost 25 feet (7.6 m) of the lot later the same month. On the remainder of the site, he planned to build a 38-foot-wide (12 m) residence, with a gap between his house and the lot he had just sold. Edey was recorded as the buyer of the 25-foot-wide lot at 10 West 56th Street. These were the only two vacant lots on the block at the time. Hollins and Edey agreed to construct their houses jointly and build their respective houses to the lot line. Hollins hired McKim, Mead & White to design his house, but an 1881 covenant prevented Edey from building a structure out to the lot line until 1901. As a result, Hollins was able to start work on his house right away, while Edey had to wait.

When the Edeys were finally allowed to build their house, they hired Warren and Wetmore instead. The firm filed plans for a slate-roofed brick-and-stone dwelling in mid-1901, with a projected cost of $50,000. The family moved into the house two years later. Over the next decade, the Edey and Hollins families did not host any events together, and neither The Brooklyn Daily Eagle nor The New York Times made any mention of the two houses as a pair. According to a 1905 census conducted by the New York state government, the Edey family lived in the house with ten servants.

The house was used in 1908 to host the marriage of Daisy Taylor and Stephen Chase. The Edeys' 56th Street house was used for various events during the 1910s as well. This included a debutante dance in 1912, a dance to benefit the Ruloff Fresh Air Fund in 1914, and an event on behalf of the Edeys' niece Mary F. Edey in 1916. While the Edeys were at their Bellport estate in 1912, the house experienced an unusual burglary in which the thief locked a servant in a closet and took only the key to the door. By the mid-1910s, the surrounding neighborhood was rapidly becoming a commercial zone, and many neighboring townhouses were converted to commercial use. Birdsall Otis Edey ultimately sold the house in late 1919 to the Frangold Realty Company. Shortly after the Edey House had been sold, the sixth story was constructed.

=== Commercial use ===
==== Mid-20th century ====
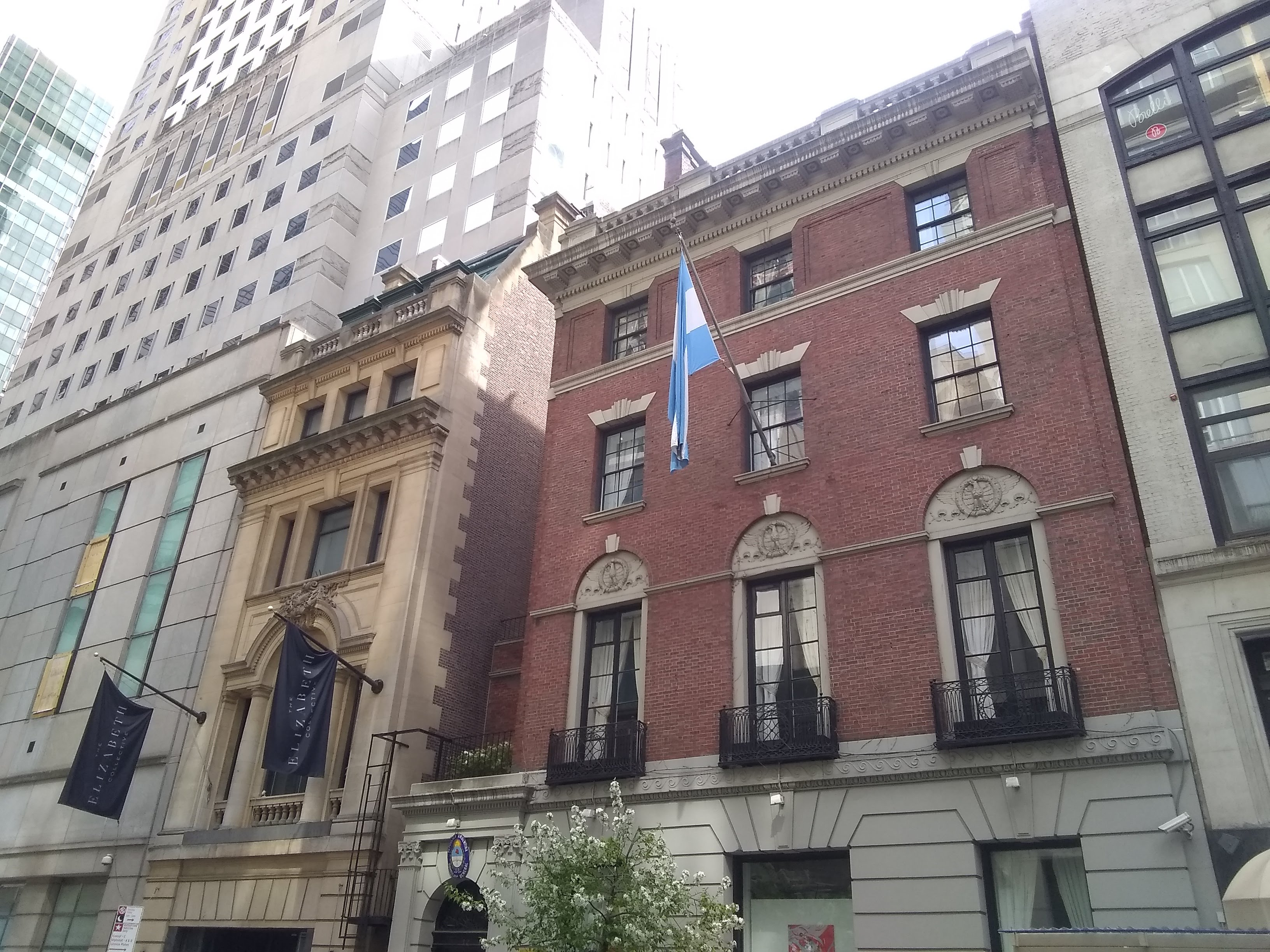
The space between 10 and 12 West 56th Street, originally a courtyard, now contains number 12's entrance.

In January 1920, the residence was conveyed to an upscale dressmaker, Madame Frances. (Note: According to Landmarks Preservation Commission 2007, p. 5, it was leased by Frangold Realty Company to Madame Frances. According to contemporary media sources, it was sold by Edey to Madame Frances.) The store opened two months later with a showcase of "coats, street dress, evening gowns and millinery", according to The New York Times. By 1924, the store and basement had been leased to Adelaide W. Howard for a tearoom. Madame Frances moved out during 1926 or 1929 (Note: According to New York Herald Tribune 1934, the firm had vacated the building five years earlier, which would place the relocation at 1929.) and signed a new lease in 1934. Madame Frances Inc's owners, Frances and Nathan B. Spingold, subsequently acquired the building. The building was leased to Boue Soeurs, a gown and lingerie shop, in 1937 for twenty-one years. Two years afterward, Boue Soeurs moved to a building adjacent to the Tiffany & Co. flagship store on nearby 57th Street.

Lloyds Furniture Galleries leased space in the building in 1940. (Note: Landmarks Preservation Commission 2007, p. 5, cites the gallery as having leased space in 1930, but this is contradicted by media sources from 1940.) The entrance was widened for the store's products. In June 1944, the house was leased to film producer Mike Todd, who operated his offices there until the house was sold in August 1945. The new owner, Jacqueline Cochran, planned to use the house for her cosmetics store. Cochran's store barely lasted one year before Plummer Ltd, a china store, bought the house in November 1946. The house contained the fashion showroom of Erik Braagaard by 1949. The actress Elizabeth Taylor, who had been married to Mike Todd, lived in the house for two to three years in the mid-1950s. By 1958, the house served as "the first Korean trade center in the United States", operated by the Korean consul.

==== Late 20th century to present ====
The house became a store for Felissimo in 1992. The interior was remodeled by interior designer Clodagh along with Robert Pierpont. The store was temporarily closed for a three-month renovation in 1998. The store was renovated again in early 2001, becoming primarily an exhibition space. After the second renovation, the Felissimo store was described as a "design studio with a small shop on the first floor". On July 24, 2007, the New York City Landmarks Preservation Commission designated the former Edey residence at 10 West 56th Street as a city landmark, along with the Henry Seligman residence at 30 West 56th Street. By 2010, the building was vacant. During Valentine's Day in February 2011, the space was used for a pop-up store, the Heart Boutique, benefiting the American Heart Association.

Mexican billionaire Carlos Slim bought the townhouse in May 2011 for $15.5 million. In February 2015, the John Barrett Salon signed a 16,000-square-foot (1,500 m^{2}) lease for the building. The salon agreed to pay $108,333 per month, or $1.3 million a year, for the space. The salon's owners had planned for the building to be the salon's flagship and the "largest luxury salon in the U.S.". The salon did not pay one year of rent, leading Slim to sue the salon in the New York City Civil Court in 2016. Slim won the lawsuit in January 2017 and the John Barrett Salon moved out, but the salon still did not pay the back rent, which prompted Slim to file a second lawsuit in April 2017 to recover the unpaid rent. The house was leased in 2018 by the Elizabeth Collective, a gallery operated by Maison Gerard. The house underwent some renovations before the gallery opened in 2019.

== See also ==
- List of New York City Designated Landmarks in Manhattan from 14th to 59th Streets
