= The Church of the Presidents =

The Church of the Presidents may refer to:

- United First Parish Church, Quincy, Massachusetts
- Church of the Presidents (New Jersey)
- St. John's Episcopal Church, Lafayette Square
