= 5 West 54th Street =

Building in Manhattan, New York

- Dr. Moses Allen Starr Residence
- U.S. Historic district – Contributing property
- New York City Landmark
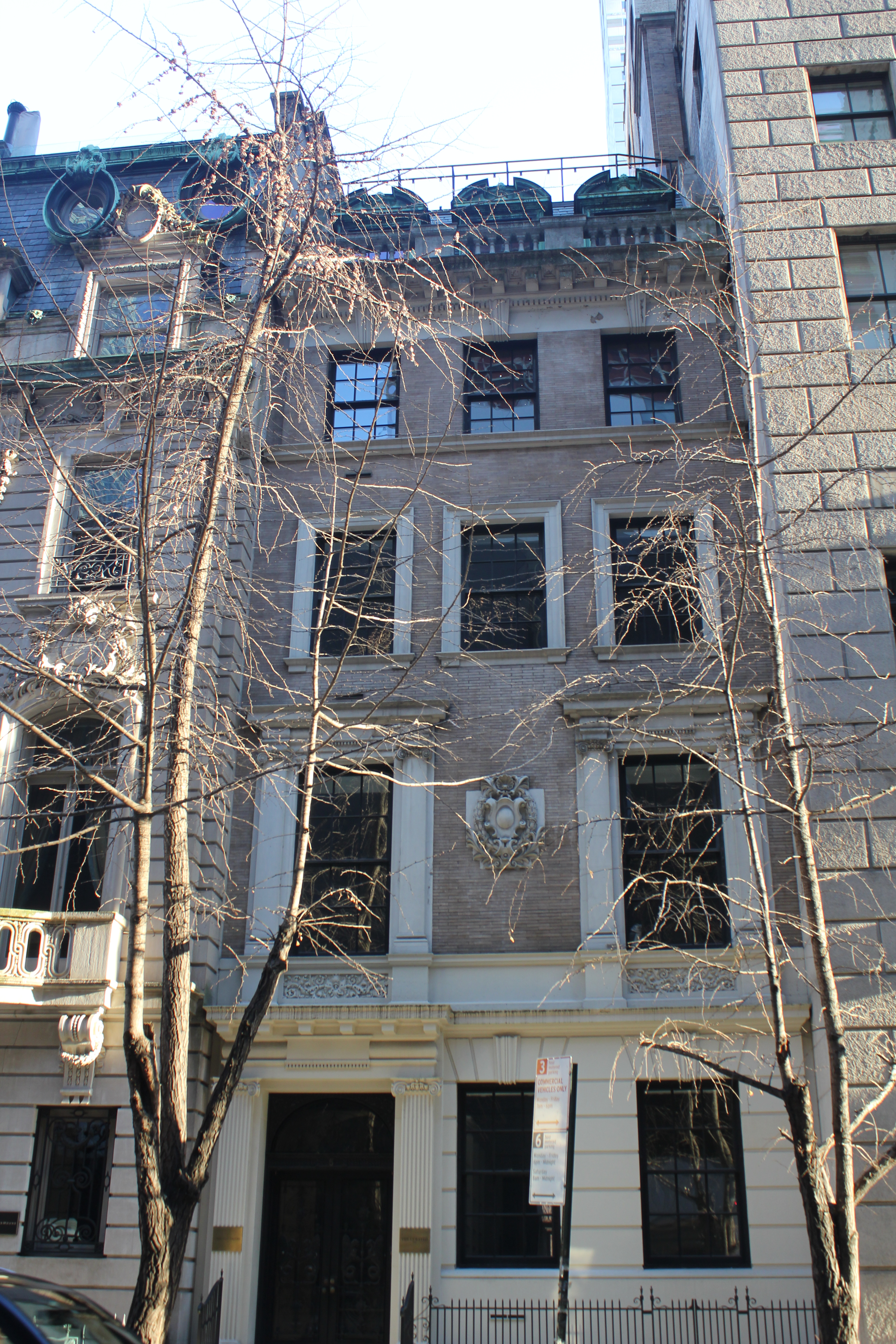
- (February 2022)
- Location: 5 West 54th Street, Manhattan, New York, US
- Coordinates: 40°45′41″N 73°58′34″W
- Architect: R. H. Robertson
- Architectural style: Renaissance Revival
- Part of: Residences at 5-15 West 54th Street (ID89002260)
- NYCL No.: 1101

Significant dates
- Designated CP: January 4, 1990
- Designated NYCL: February 3, 1981

5 West 54th Street (also the Dr. Moses Allen Starr Residence) is a commercial building in the Midtown Manhattan neighborhood of New York City, United States. It is along 54th Street's northern sidewalk between Fifth Avenue and Sixth Avenue. The four-story building was designed by R. H. Robertson in the Italian Renaissance Revival style and was constructed between 1897 and 1899 as a private residence. It is the easternmost of five consecutive townhouses erected along the same city block during the 1890s, the others being 7, 11, 13 and 15 West 54th Street. The first floor is clad with rusticated blocks of limestone, while the other floors contain buff-colored brick trimmed with limestone.

The house was commissioned for neurologist Moses Allen Starr, who lived there until he died in 1932. His widow Alice continued to live there until she died in 1942. The next year, Robert Lehman bought the residence and lent it to Freedom House. The house was used as a veteran's retreat after World War II. It was used as the offices of Faberge Inc. from 1948 to 1970 and by John S. Lastis Inc. after 1974. The New York City Landmarks Preservation Commission designated the house as an official landmark in 1981, and it was added to the National Register of Historic Places in 1990 as part of the 5–15 West 54th Street Residences historic district. As of 2018, the house contains a boutique, The Curated NYC, operated by Christian Siriano.

== Site ==
5 West 54th Street is in the Midtown Manhattan neighborhood of New York City, United States. It is along the northern sidewalk of 54th Street between Fifth Avenue and Sixth Avenue. The land lot is rectangular and covers 2,510 square feet (233 m^{2}), with a frontage of 25 feet (7.6 m) on 54th Street and a depth of 100.42 feet (30.61 m). The building is the easternmost of five consecutive townhouses erected along the same city block; from east to west, the other houses are 7, 11, 13 and 15 West 54th Street. The five townhouses are adjoined by the Rockefeller Apartments to the west, The Peninsula New York and the St. Regis New York hotels to the northeast, the University Club of New York and 689 Fifth Avenue to the east, the William H. Moore House and Saint Thomas Church to the southeast, and the Museum of Modern Art to the south.

Fifth Avenue between 42nd Street and Central Park South (59th Street) was relatively undeveloped through the late 19th century. The surrounding area was once part of the common lands of the city of New York. The Commissioners' Plan of 1811 established Manhattan's street grid with lots measuring 100 feet (30 m) deep and 25 feet (7.6 m) wide. Upscale residences were constructed around Fifth Avenue following the American Civil War. The two-block stretch of West and East 54th Street from Madison Avenue to Sixth Avenue, bisected by Fifth Avenue, was developed with the houses of prominent figures such as William Henry Moore, John R. Platt, and John D. Rockefeller Sr. The sites of the five houses at 5–15 West 54th Street, along with the University Club, were formerly occupied by St. Luke's Hospital, which moved out during 1896.

== Architecture ==
The houses at 5–15 West 54th Street, all developed in the late 1890s for wealthy clients, were designed as a cohesive grouping, unlike other residences in the neighborhood. According to The New York Times, the houses form the sole remaining "real strip of mansions" in Midtown Manhattan. The houses at 5, 7, 9–11, and 13 and 15 West 54th Street all had different architects. 5 West 54th Street was designed by Robert Henderson Robertson in the Italian Renaissance Revival style. Russell Sturgis, writing for Architectural Record in 1900, described the house as having a "too markedly simple front", considering the stone cartouche between the second-floor windows to be "meaningless" even as it served to center the facade.

=== Facade ===
The building is four and a half stories tall and three bays wide. Along the street facade, it is set behind an iron railing and a small concrete yard. The basement and first floor are clad with rusticated blocks of limestone. From the ground level, a low stoop leads to the first-floor entrance, on the left (west) side of the facade. The entryway consists of fluted pilasters designed in the Ionic style, topped by Scamozzi-style capitals. The doorway is composed of double glass doors and is topped by an entablature with modillions and a projecting cornice. At the center of the entablature and the architrave, there are guttae. Two windows are on the right side of the first-floor facade and contain a keystone flanked by rusticated voussoir blocks.

The other floors are clad with buff-colored brick trimmed in limestone. The second story is treated as a piano nobile, with two windows containing large entablatures and Ionic pilasters, as well as carved panels beneath each window. Unlike on the first story, the second-story pilasters are not fluted. There is also a decorative stone cartouche between the two second-story windows. The third floor has three windows with sills supported by brackets. Between the third and fourth stories, a molded string course runs horizontally across the facade. The fourth story also has three windows, but these have keystones and a continuous lintel above them. A cornice with modillions runs above the fourth story. The building is topped by a mansard roof with a stone balustrade. Three dormer windows project from the roof; each is topped by broken segmental-arched pediments containing urns in their centers. The house's original exterior is mostly intact except for a metal and glass barrier on the roof and air-conditioning vents on the third floor.

=== Interior ===
The house has a gross floor area of 9,485 square feet (881.2 m^{2}) according to the New York City Department of City Planning. Real-estate listings show that there is a subcellar, concourse, five above-ground stories, and a roof deck, with a total of 14,966 square feet (1,390.4 m^{2}) of usable space. These are all connected by a spiral staircase and an elevator connecting all levels.

By the 1990s, when the house served as a Harrison James store, it had a private elevator, spiral staircase, and fourteen fireplaces. The Harrison James store contained a reception area inside the entrance and a bar and lounge on the second story. There was also a rooftop bar. As of 2018, it contains The Curated NYC, a boutique operated by fashion designer Christian Siriano, as well as his atelier and offices. Media at the time described the building as having eight stories, including the concourse, subcellar, and roof deck. The space also includes a coffee shop named Joye & Rose and a vegan restaurant named Rose Café.

== History ==
=== Residence ===
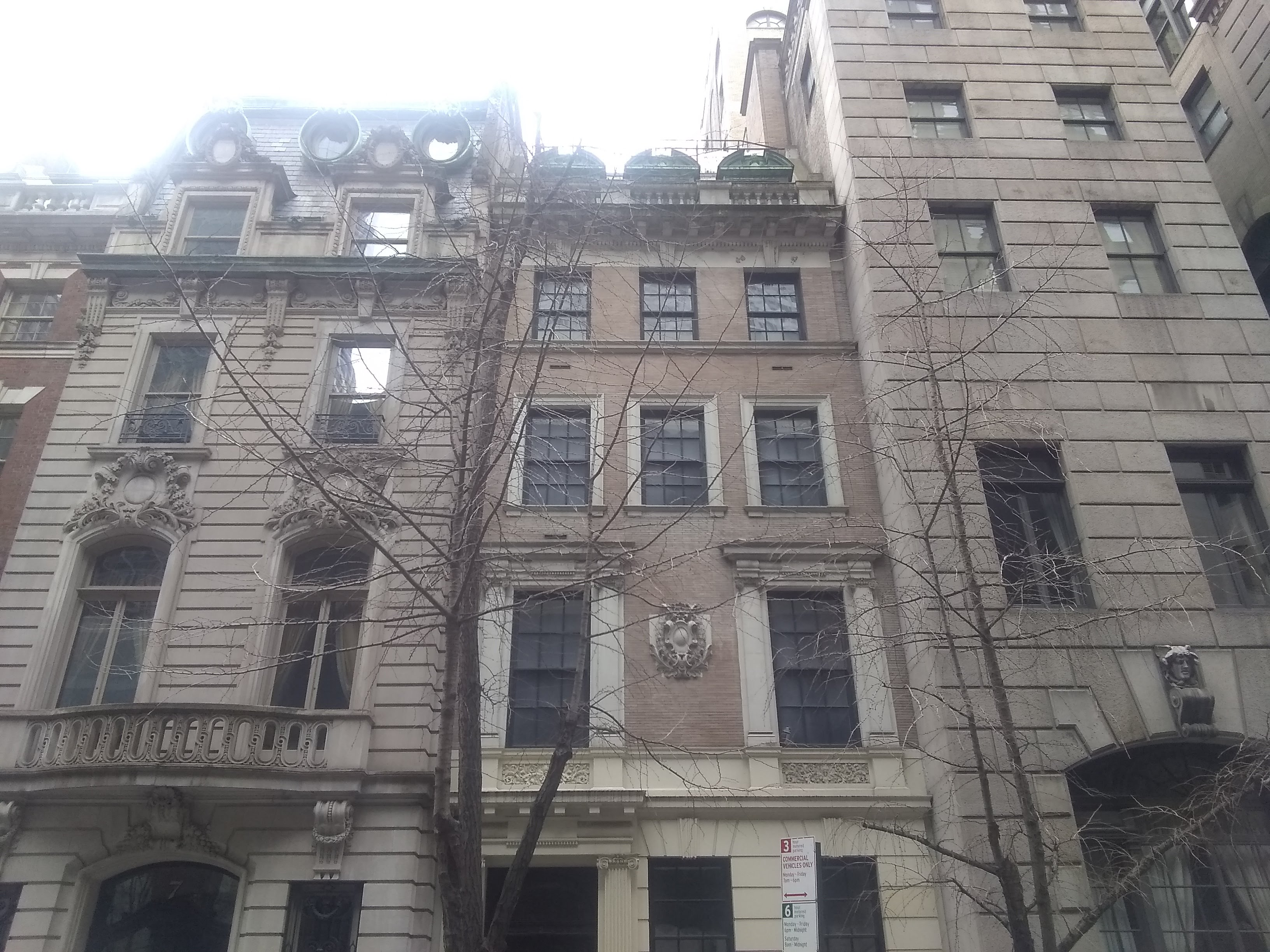
The house as viewed in March 2021, with 7 West 54th Street at left and University Club of New York at right

In 1896, with the relocation of St. Luke's Hospital from Midtown to Morningside Heights, Manhattan, the hospital's former site on the northern side of 54th Street west of Fifth Avenue became available for development. The University Club, whose construction commenced the same year, was the first structure to be built on the former hospital plot. In May 1897, Moses Allen Starr acquired a plot on 54th Street about 175 feet (53 m) west of Fifth Avenue. Starr was a neurology professor at Columbia University and was one of the most prominent neurologists in the United States. The same month, R. H. Robertson was commissioned to design a house on the site. Robertson filed plans for the house with the New York City Department of Buildings in July 1897, with the house projected to cost $60,000.

The house was completed in 1899. It was initially occupied by Starr, who married Alice Dunning in 1898. The surrounding neighborhood rapidly became a commercial zone after World War I, and many neighboring townhouses were converted to commercial use, but the Starr family retained the house. In 1918, Marc Eidlitz & Son was hired to make modifications to the house, although the alteration plans remained private. Among the events held at the house was a reception for debutantes in 1921, attended by the Starrs' own daughter Katherine, as well as a committee in charge of a performance of Parsifal in 1929. Moses Allen Starr died in Germany in 1932. Alice Starr continued to live in the house for a decade after her husband died. Alice remained in philanthropic activities: for example, she was involved with management of the West Side Day Nursery from 1902 until her death. Alice died in December 1942 at her country estate at Mount Kisco, New York.

=== Later use ===
Alice Starr's estate sold the house in September 1943 to Robert Lehman, whose father Philip Lehman lived at the neighboring 7 West 54th Street. Lehman lent the house to the Freedom House organization, which moved into the building in January 1944. That August, Americans United for World Organization was also founded at the former Starr residence. Freedom House acquired another building at 20 West 40th Street the next year. It then served as a rest home used by World War II veterans. The house was also used for the Victory Clothing Collection's headquarters in 1946. Fashion company Fabergé acquired the house from Robert Lehman in 1948. The next year, Katz Waisman Blumenkranz Stein & Weber was hired to turn the house into offices for $50,000.

Fabergé occupied the house until 1970, and it was sold to John S. Lastis Inc. in 1974. In the intervening time, it was used for the presentation of the 1971 Straw Hat Award, an award for summer theatrical productions in the United States. The New York City Landmarks Preservation Commission designated the five houses at 5–15 West 54th Street as city landmarks, including the Goodwin residence, on February 3, 1981. The Committee for the Preservation of West 54th and West 55th Streets had pushed for the landmark designation. At the time, the five houses were in various states of preservation: the double house at 9–11 West 54th Street was being restored, but the twin houses at 13 and 15 West 54th Street had been proposed for demolition. On January 4, 1990, the building was added to the National Register of Historic Places as part of the Residences at 5–15 West 54th Street historic district.

At some point in the late 20th century, the building served as headquarters of a Greek shipping company, and it was known as Petrola House. In 1996, Alan Katzman leased the house for 20 years and converted the house into retail space for his company, men's clothing store Harrison James. The same year, fine dining restaurant Maximilian leased the building's rooftop greenhouse. The restaurant's operators also opened the second-story bar and lounge, as well as private dining spaces. The Harrison James store also featured a barbershop. The Research Board, a think tank, occupied the building in the early 21st century. Christian Siriano's The Curated NYC boutique opened in the building in April 2018. The house had been unoccupied for ten years before it was renovated for the boutique.

== See also ==
- List of New York City Designated Landmarks in Manhattan from 14th to 59th Streets
- National Register of Historic Places listings in Manhattan from 14th to 59th Streets
