= Cinda Hallman =

- Born: 1944; Arkansas
- Died: 2007 (aged 62–63)
- Education: Southern Arkansas University
- Known for: Former CEO of Spherion

Cinda A. Hallman (1944–2007) became noteworthy for her work in Y2K prior to coining the phrase "outsource the outsourcing process;" both of these were at Du Pont, prior to her nomination to The Research Board.

== Biography ==
Arkansas-born Hallman began her career at Conoco in 1966 where she was hired as a systems analyst directly after graduating from Southern Arkansas University.

=== Du Pont ===
Conoco was acquired by Du Pont in 1981. In 1988 Hallman moved to the parent company, and advanced to CIO in 1992. By 1999 she held a senior vice president title, the company's first female vice president . (Note: Hillman was close to Edgar S. Woolard Jr., Du Pont CEO (1989 to 1995).)

=== Spherion ===
Hallman joined Spherion in 2001 as Chief Executive Officer and retired in 2004. She died December 2007, at age 63 from an illness. (Note: Decades older than the age at which her father had died: "early in life, on her family's farm after her father's death")

She had been a member of Spherion's board of directors since early 1995. Hallman replaced Raymond Marcy as Chief Executive Officer in 2001, a role that Marcy had held for over a decade, during which time (Note: 1999) Spherion acquired a rival, Norrell Corp.

Spherion's prior name was Interim Services. (Note: Interim had been sold by H&R Block in 1994)

==== Outsourcing ====
Hallman made a mark in the area of major multi-billion dollar (Note: a $4 billion 10 year contract) outsourcing.

=== Board memberships ===
Among the boards of directors on which she served were Toys "R" Us, Catalyst, United Way of America, and Christiana Care Health Systems.

== Legacy ==
Beyond having pioneered in what later became known as midsourcing (and receiving various awards), Hallman's alma mater wrote about serving as "an inspiration for young women as she met the challenges of corporate leadership and succeeded at the highest levels."
