= Ulysses S. Grant Cottage =

Cottage in Elberon, New Jersey

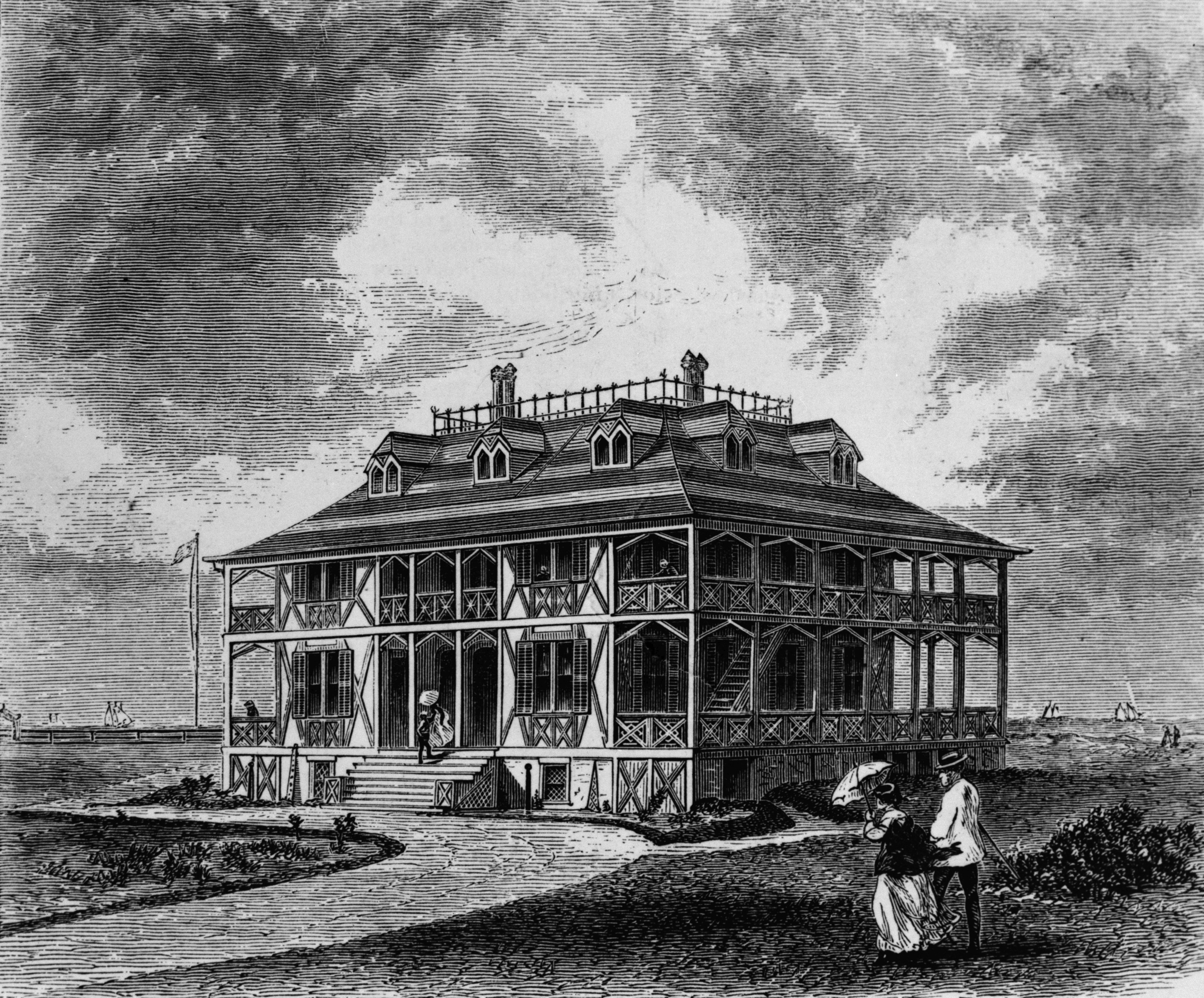
- Interactive map of the Ulysses S. Grant Cottage area

General information
- Type: Chalet
- Architectural style: Bavarian
- Location: Elberon, New Jersey, 995 Ocean Avenue, Long Branch, New Jersey, United States
- Coordinates: 40°16′17″N 73°59′08″W
- Demolished: 1963

The Ulysses S. Grant Cottage was the Summer White House of U.S. President Ulysses S. Grant in Elberon, a part of Long Branch, New Jersey. Grant vacationed at the cottage starting in the summer of 1867, and thereafter spent three months of every summer there until 1885. He held cabinet meetings and composed parts of his memoirs at the cottage. The presence of Grant and the cottage helped popularize Elberon as a place for the elite to meet; a status that only faded when the railroad came to town and it became more accessible. The cottage was demolished in 1963 by its then owner, who did not possess the funds necessary to preserve the building. The site is today a grassy field.

== History ==
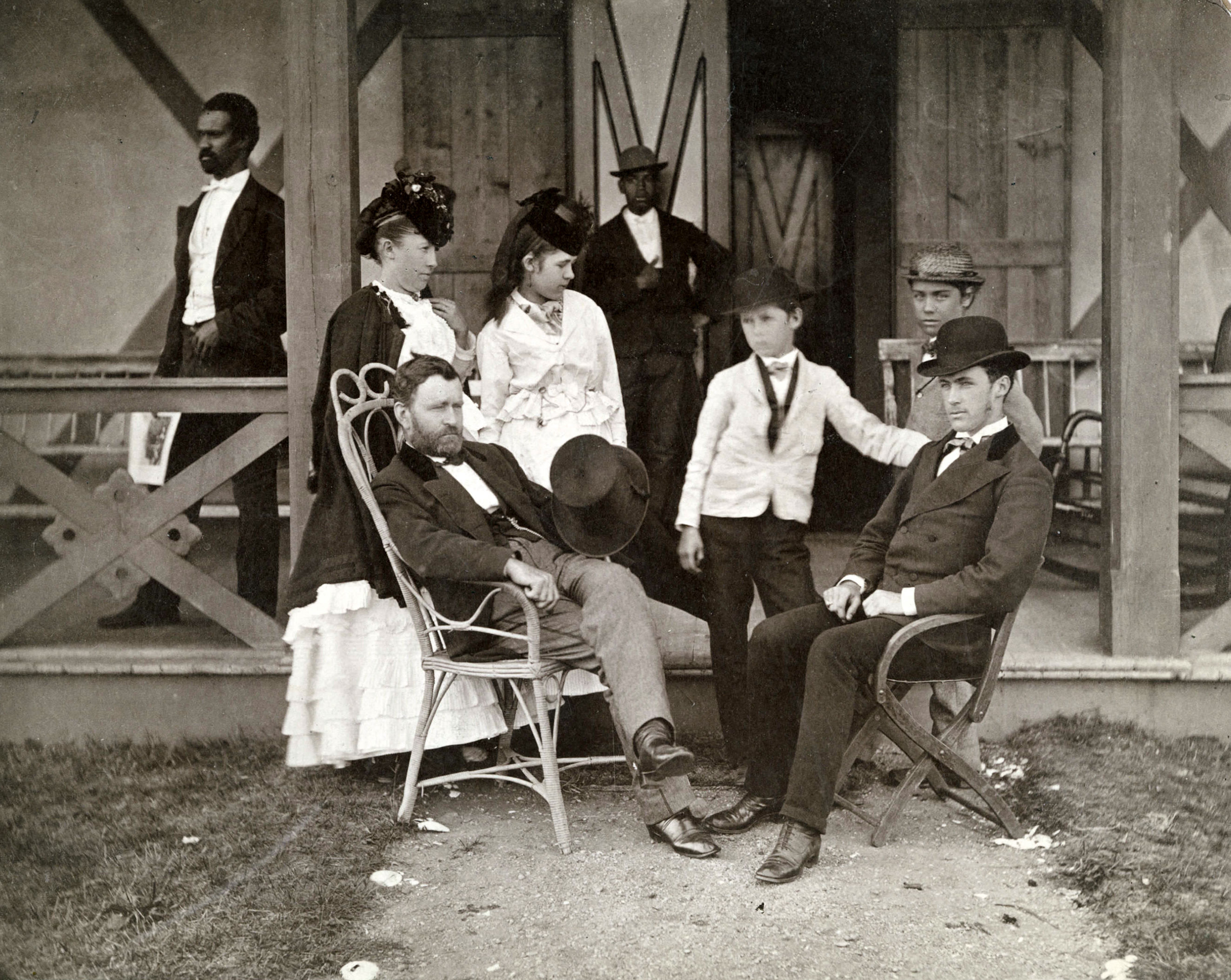
Ulysses S. Grant with wife Julia and children Nellie, Jesse, Ulysses Jr. and Frederick relaxing at the cottage in 1870.

Ulysses S. Grant received the cottage as a gift from wealthy acquaintances aligned with the Republican Party who had summer homes in Elberon, New Jersey. These homes, being within walking distance of each other, provided an atmosphere conducive to achieving a meeting of the minds as it pertained to the issues of the day. The cottage was used by the Grant family for three months of every summer starting in 1867 and culminating in 1885, years after Grant had already been out of office. It was one of many Summer White Houses utilized by United States presidents during the summer months. Grant enjoyed staying there so much that he was criticized for spending too much time at the cottage. Referring to Long Branch, New Jersey, as the "summer capital", Grant presided over cabinet meetings at the cottage, and strategized the failed proposal to annex the Dominican Republic there. He wrote much of his Personal Memoirs of Ulysses S. Grant at the cottage. While staying in Long Branch, Grant worshiped at the Church of the Presidents on Ocean Avenue.

In 1941, the Sisters of St. Joseph of the Peace purchased the adjacent property and turned the entire seven acres into the Stella Maris Retreat Center. In 1963, having decided to improve the property but not possessing the requisite funds to restore the cottage, the Sisters decided to have the building razed. The complex closed in 2015.

== Description ==
The cottage was located at 995 Ocean Avenue in Elberon, a part of Long Branch, on a plot of land fronting the Atlantic Ocean. It was built as a chalet in the Bavarian style. It was bulldozed in 1963. The site is currently a vacant grassy field bordered by a white picket fence.

== Legacy ==
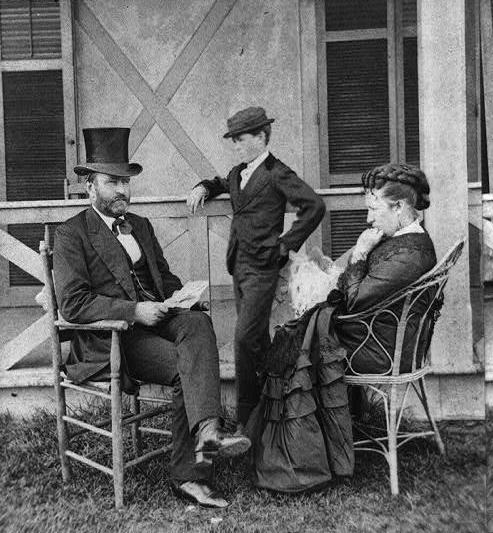
Grant with Julia and Jesse at the cottage in 1872.

By choosing to spend his summers in Long Branch, Grant set the stage for the town to become a seaside resort for many years afterwards. He started a tradition for later U.S. presidents to also spend time in Long Branch. These included James A. Garfield, Rutherford B. Hayes, Chester A. Arthur, Benjamin Harrison, William McKinley and Woodrow Wilson.

A statue of Grant and a commemorative plaque are featured on the boardwalk nearby.

== See also ==
- Garfield Tea House
- List of residences of presidents of the United States
