= Spherion =

- Industry: Recruitment
- Founded: 1946
- Founder: Leroy Dettman
- Headquarters: Atlanta, Georgia, US
- Key people: Kathy George (President)
- Owner: Randstad NV
- Website: www.spherion.com

Spherion is a North American temporary work agency headquartered in Atlanta, Georgia, that operates under a variety of brand names.

== History ==
Spherion was first known as City Car Unloaders, a Chicago company created by Leroy Dettman and Joseph Perfetto in 1946. They initially placed manual laborers in temporary jobs loading cargo. Filling temporary clerk jobs was a service the company only later added.

The company relocated from Chicago to Fort Lauderdale in 1969.

By 1978, the firm was doing business as Personnel Pool of America, Inc, and was acquired by H&R Block. In 1991, H&R Block acquired Interim Systems Corporation and combined it with Personnel Pool, creating a larger staffing services firm.

In 1992, the company changed its name to Interim Services Inc., and was spun off by H&R Block in 1994. Interim acquired a number of other companies over the next few years.

The company, which changed its name to Spherion in 2000, was acquired by Randstad NV in July 2011.

== Brands ==
Spherion has done business under a variety of brand names. The following brands are more or less current: Emerging Workforce, The Mergis Group, SFN Group, Sourceright Solutions, Spherion, Spherion Recruitment Process Outsourcing, Spherion Staffing Services, Tatum, Technisource Victor Temporary Services, Professional Nurses Bureau, and Today's Office Professionals.

== Leadership ==
Cinda Hallman, a member of Spherion's board of directors beginning in early 1995, replaced Raymond Marcy as chief executive officer in 2001, a role that Marcy had held for over a decade. Rebecca Rogers Tijerino became the CEO of Spherion in January 2019. Rogers Tijerino left the company and was replaced by Kathy George in February 2024.

== Acquisitions and spinoffs ==
An "acquisition spree" that began in 1994 led to Spherion's 1999 acquiring of an Atlanta-based rival, Norrell Corp. Part of Fort Lauderdale-based Spherion's board of directors wanted to move corporate headquarters to Atlanta, a conflict that ended when Marcy was replaced by Hallman in 2001.

In 2001 Spherion made an initial public offering (IPO) of its London-based Michael Page Group, which it acquired in 1997.

Spherion sold its Saratoga Institute to PricewaterhouseCoopers in 2003.
