= Garfield Tea House =

Commemorative structure in New Jersey

Coordinates: 40.262601°N 73.990383°W

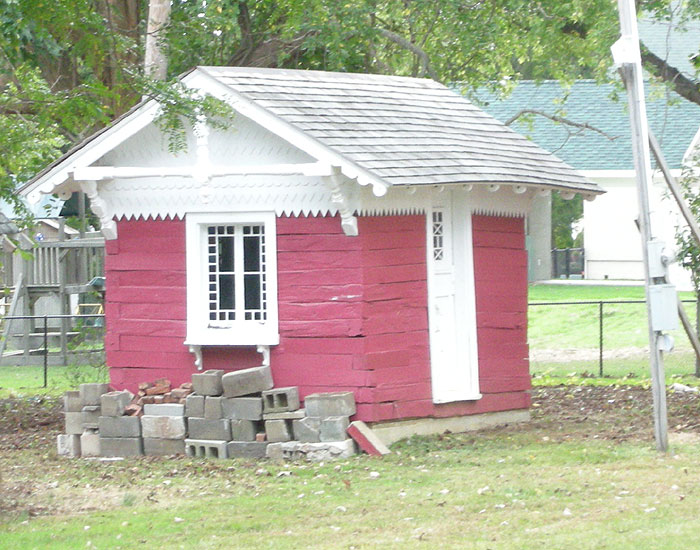
The Tea House in October 2007

The Garfield Tea House in Long Branch, New Jersey, is the only remaining structure directly related to President James A. Garfield's final trip to the Jersey Shore. The Garfield Tea House was built from the railroad ties used to lay the emergency track that transported a dying President Garfield from the nearby Elberon train station to the oceanfront cottage where he died 12 days later.

The Garfield Tea House is located at 1260 Ocean Avenue in Long Branch, across the street from the Atlantic Ocean.

== History ==
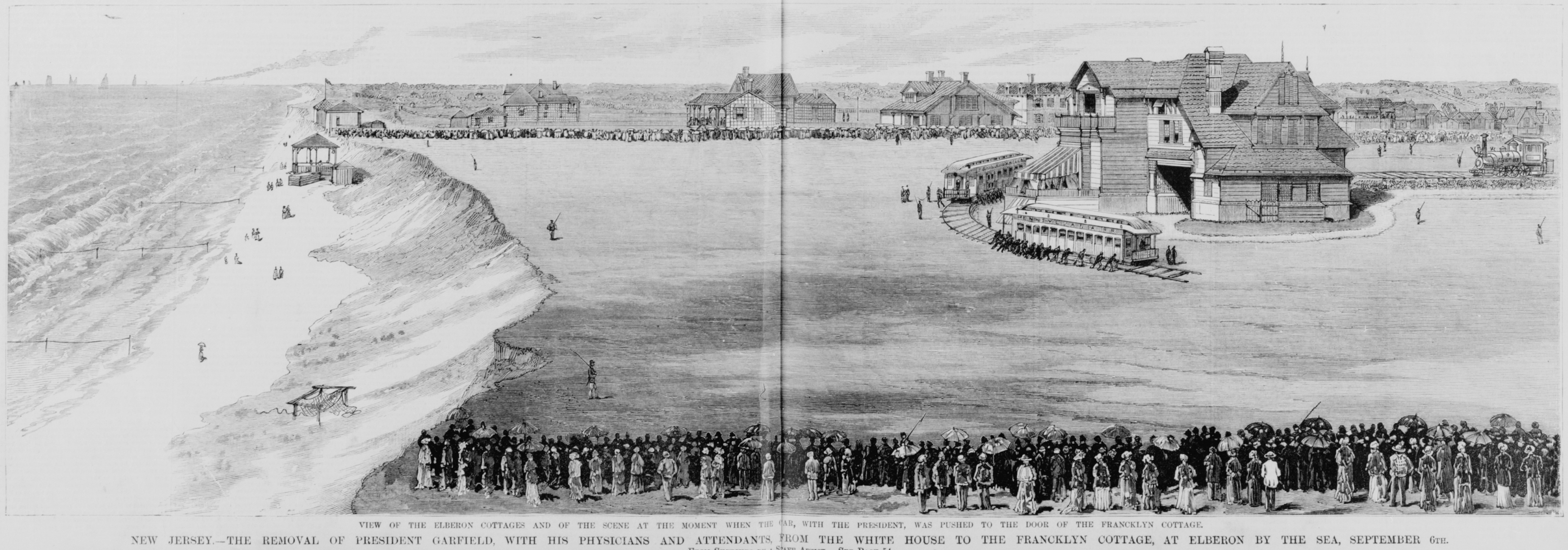
Francklyn Cottage, at Elberon by the sea, September 6, 1881, showing the laying of the tracks

Garfield was a regular visitor to Long Branch. Less than four months after taking office, the president was shot on July 2, 1881, while waiting to board a train from Washington to Long Branch by Charles J. Guiteau, a delusional religious fanatic who was disgruntled by failed efforts to secure a federal post.

On September 5, 1881, more than half a mile of railroad tracks were laid out in less than 24 hours by local residents when they learned that the president, who was in poor condition, was coming to Long Branch from Washington DC to help him recover from his gunshot wounds. Rather than requiring the president to move by a horse-drawn carriage over rough roads, the tracks enabled Garfield to be brought directly to the front door of the oceanfront Francklyn cottage from the local Elberon train station. The railroad spur ran down the middle of a local road, which today is Lincoln Avenue. President Garfield arrived in Elberon on the evening of September 6.

After Garfield died 12 days later on September 19, the tracks were torn up and the wooden ties were purchased by actor Oliver Doud Byron, who had local carpenter William Presley build the Garfield Tea House with them. It first stood in the yard of Byron's summer cottage. One of the original rails is used as the ridgepole supporting the roof. The original colors of the building were red, white, and blue; today it is red and white. After several moves, including one to the Presley home in North Long Branch, the tea house now rests on the Long Branch Historical Museum grounds on Ocean Avenue near the former site of Francklyn cottage. The remains of the railroad spur tracks near the former cottage became part of a small one-lane residential road near the beach which is now called Garfield Road.

== Preservation ==
The Long Branch Historical Museum Association, which owns the structure, has mounted an effort to restore the Church of the Presidents and its grounds, on which the tea house rests. Restoration of the tea house is part of the four-phase preservation plan to preserve the Church of the Presidents, currently in its second phase of restoration.

== Planned relocation ==
In 2024, New Jersey congressman Frank Pallone secured $500,000 of community project funding for improvements to Elberon. Planned improvements include a small park, to which the Garfield Tea House will be moved.

== See also ==
- Ulysses S. Grant Cottage
