= St. John the Martyr Church (New York City) =

Church building in Manhattan, NY, USA

Coordinates: 40°46′7.63″N 73°57′32.58″W

Church of St. John the Martyr (formerly Knox Memorial Presbyterian Church)
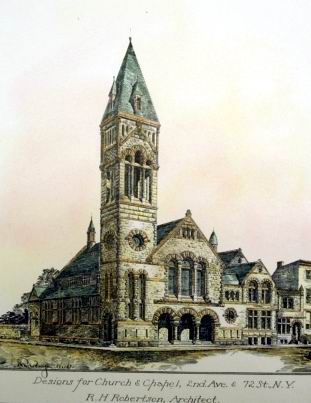
- Robertson's 1886 designs for a church on the Upper East Side of Manhattan. The main church was never built, but the chapel was, as Knox Presbyterian Church, now St. John the Martyr Roman Catholic Church.

General information
- Location: 250 East 72nd Street, Upper East Side, Manhattan, New York City, New York, United States of America
- Construction started: 1904 (for renovation)
- Completed: 1887 (for church)
- Client: The Presbytery of New York, purchased by the Roman Catholic Archdiocese of New York

Design and construction
- Architect: R.H. Robertson (for 1887 church)

The Church of St. John the Martyr was a Roman Catholic parish church in the Roman Catholic Archdiocese of New York, located at 250 East 72nd Street, Upper East Side, Manhattan, New York City, New York.

== History ==
The parish was established in 1903 by the Rev. John T. Prout for the Bohemian Catholics in the neighborhood of East 72nd Street. In 1903, Archbishop John Cardinal Farley bought a house for $13,000 ($470,000 in current dollar terms) at 249 East 71st Street as a residence for Fr. Prout. It was fitted up as a chapel and the newly appointed pastor celebrated the parish’s first mass there on September 20, 1903. This served until September 25, 1904, when the Knox Memorial Presbyterian Church at 250 East 72nd Street was purchased for $39,000 ($1,400,000 and refitted for the use of St. John’s congregation. The Order of Carmelites appointed to run the parish in 2007.

== Buildings ==
The former Knox Presbyterian Church, at 252 East 72nd Street, was purchased September 25, 1904 for $39,000 and refitted as a Catholic church that year. The building had been built 1887 to the designs of notable Protestant ecclesiastical architect Robert Henderson Robertson

== Artifacts ==
"Among the paintings presented to the church are the "Three Marys at the Tomb of Christ" (valued at $10,000) by Albert Zimmermann and "St. John Nepomucene" by Alphonse Mucha. The chime of ten bells was a personal gift to Father Prout from Christian Young, a banker and a Lutheran, and was rung for the first time at New Year's 1905. At the Christmas Mass in the same year, the Bohemian violinist, Kubelik, played." "The church possesses a reliquary containing more than 60 precious relics, secured from a noble family in Rome. the certificate is signed by Cardinal Patrizzi, and the collection is said to be one of the most valuable in the archdiocese. The catholic population numbers about 4,000. The records for 1913 show 408 baptisms and 105 marriages. The church property is valued at $92,000, with a debt of $52,500. Father Prout is assisted by Revs. Joseph Parker and Joseph Debal."

== Pastors ==
- 1903: Rev. Father John T. Prout was born in New York on May 9, 1875, of Bohemian parents; educated in the parochial schools, at St. Mary’s College (North East, Pa.), St. Joseph's Seminary (Troy), St. Joseph's Seminary (Dunwoodie), and New York University; and ordained in St. Patrick’s Cathedral on June 1, 1901. He served at St. Paul's Church (Congers, New York), and then as assistant at St. Monica’s Church (New York City), where he attended the Bohemians of the neighborhood. In 1914, it was reported "Agnostic influences are very strong there in the parish, but Father Prout receives hearty support from many of the best known Bohemian families and also from alumnae of the Sacred Heart Convent (Madison Avenue), and others. In 1909, though the efforts of Father Prout, the Austrian Immigrant Home was established at 170 East 80th Street. Later, it was moved to 84 Broad Street."
- February 1918: Fr. John Lane
- 1935: Msgr. Larkin
- 1950: Rev. Edward McGrath
- 1961: Msgr. James Nash
- March 1964: Msgr. Stanislaus McGovern
- December 1969: Msgr. Daniel Donovan
- 1984: Rev. Walter Niebrzydowski
- July 1996: Msgr. John Woolsey
- 2007: The Order of Carmelites appointed to run the parish.
- 2015: Church was closed

== Closing ==
In 2015 this church was closed and merged into the churches of St. John Nepomucene and St. Frances Xavier Cabrini (Roosevelt Island) as part of the Archdiocese of New York's many closings and mergers of 2015. Only St. John Nepomucene and St. Frances Xavier Cabrini remained open for regular Masses and other events. This combined parish of East River Catholic churches is called the Church of St. John Nepomucene, St. Frances Xavier Cabrini & St. John the Martyr. On June 30, 2017, the church was deconsecrated. As of 2018, the building was sold and demolished.
