= R. H. Robertson =

American architect (1849–1919)

Robert Henderson Robertson
- Born: April 29, 1849
- Died: June 3, 1919 (aged 70); Nehasane, Hamilton County, New York
- Education: Rutgers College
- Occupation: Architect
- Spouse: Charlotte Markoe
- Buildings: Pequot Library, Hammersmith Farm, Santanoni Preserve, 150 Nassau Street, Shelburne Farms

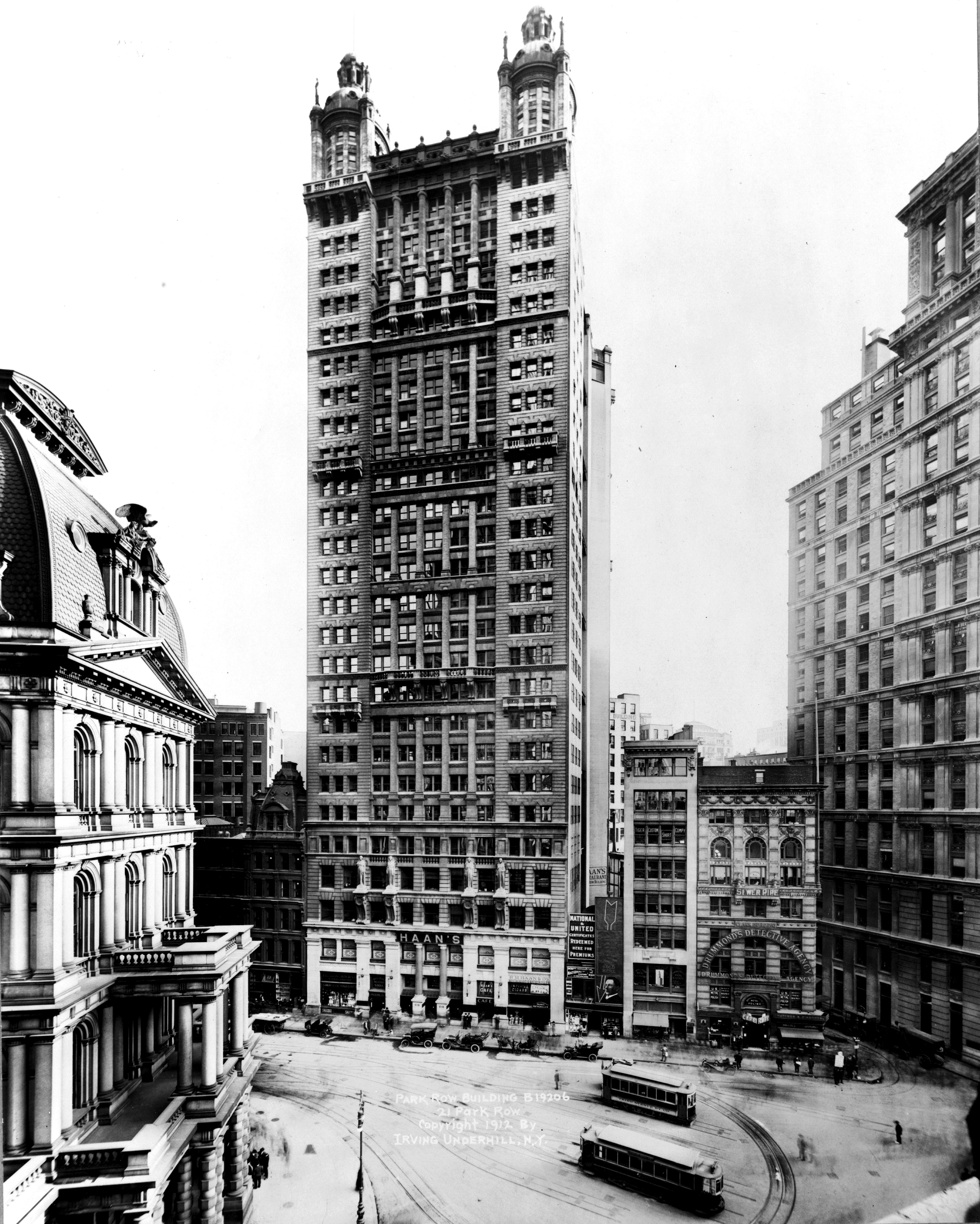
The Park Row Building in New York, designed by Robertson (completed 1899)

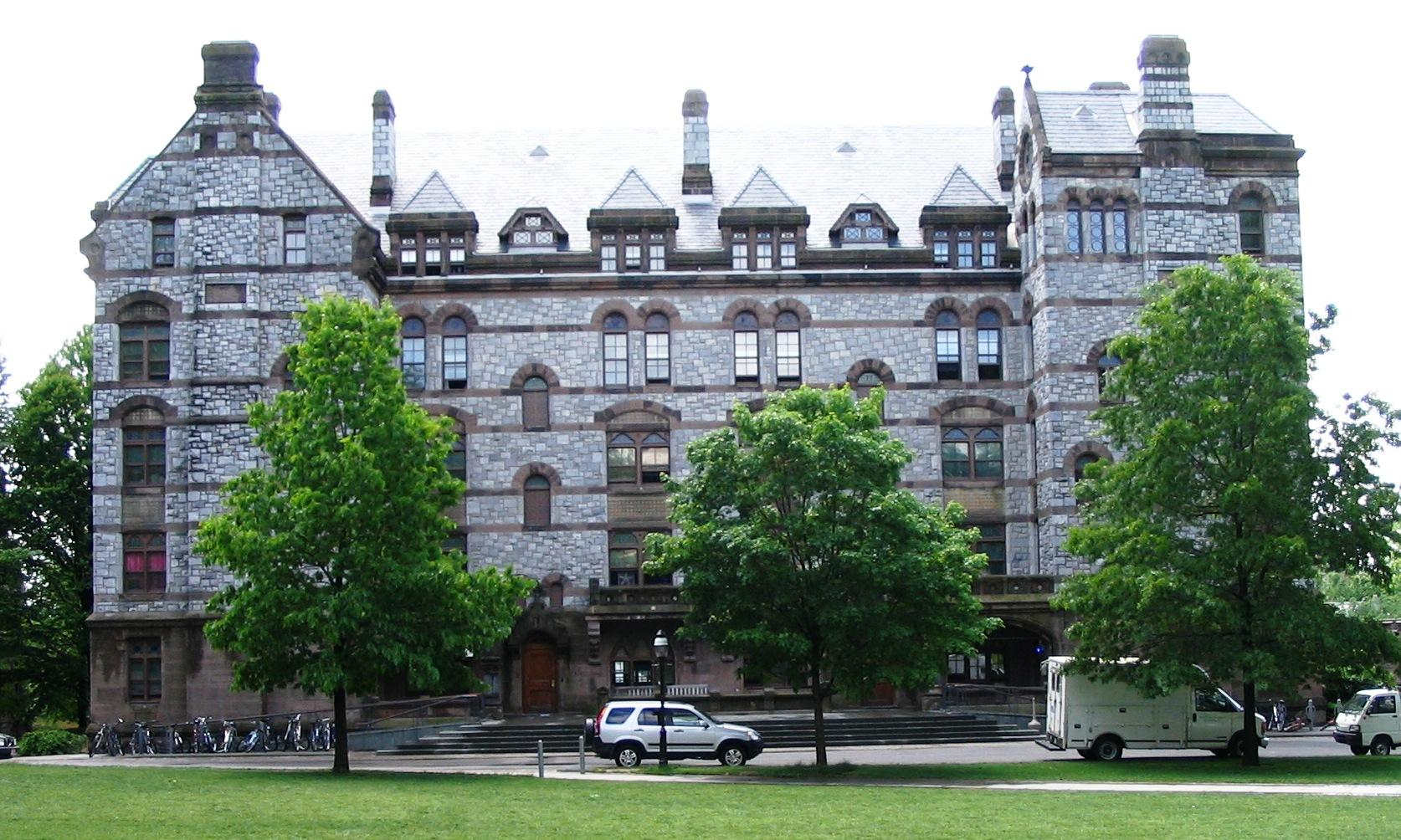
Witherspoon Hall of Princeton University (Potter & Robertson, built 1875–77)

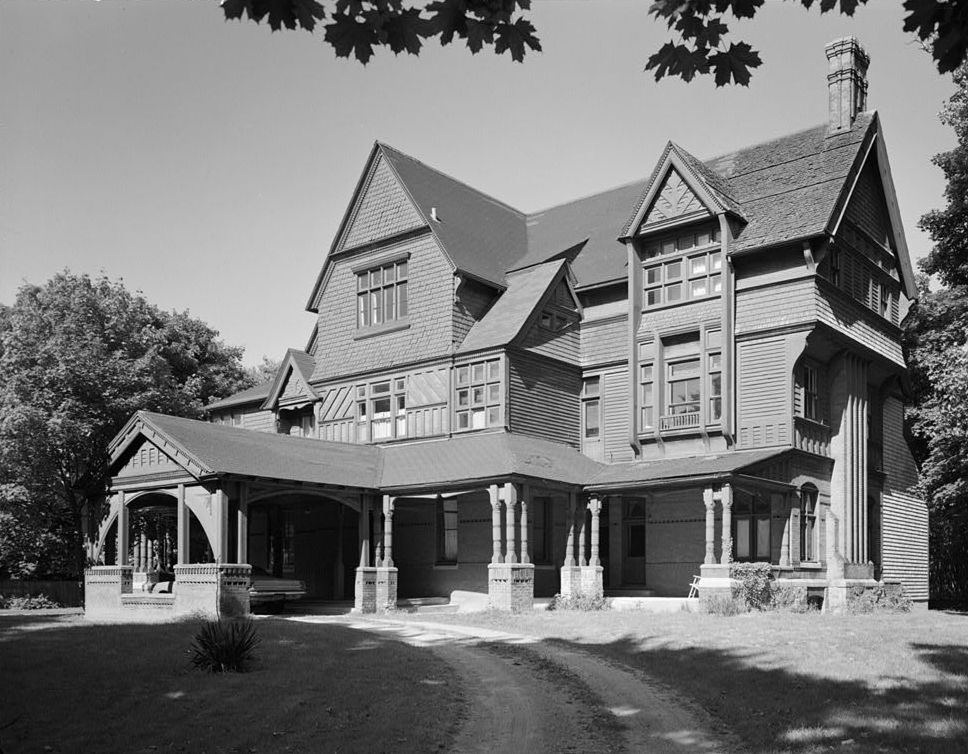
The Charles H. Baldwin House in Newport, Rhode Island (Potter & Robertson, built 1877–78)

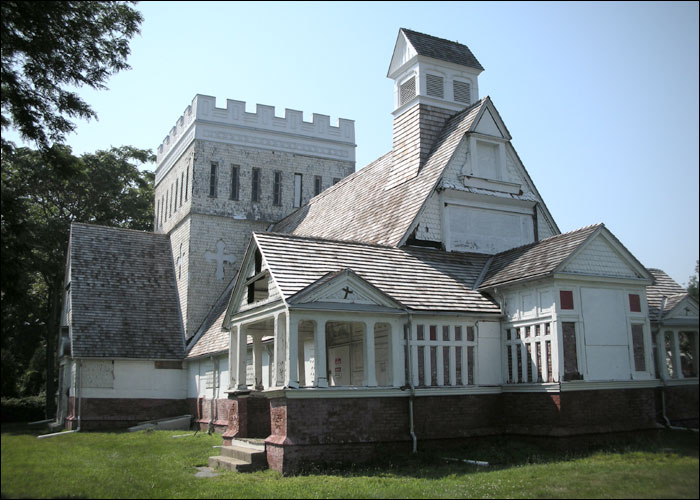
The Church of the Presidents in Elberon, New Jersey (Potter & Robertson, completed 1879)

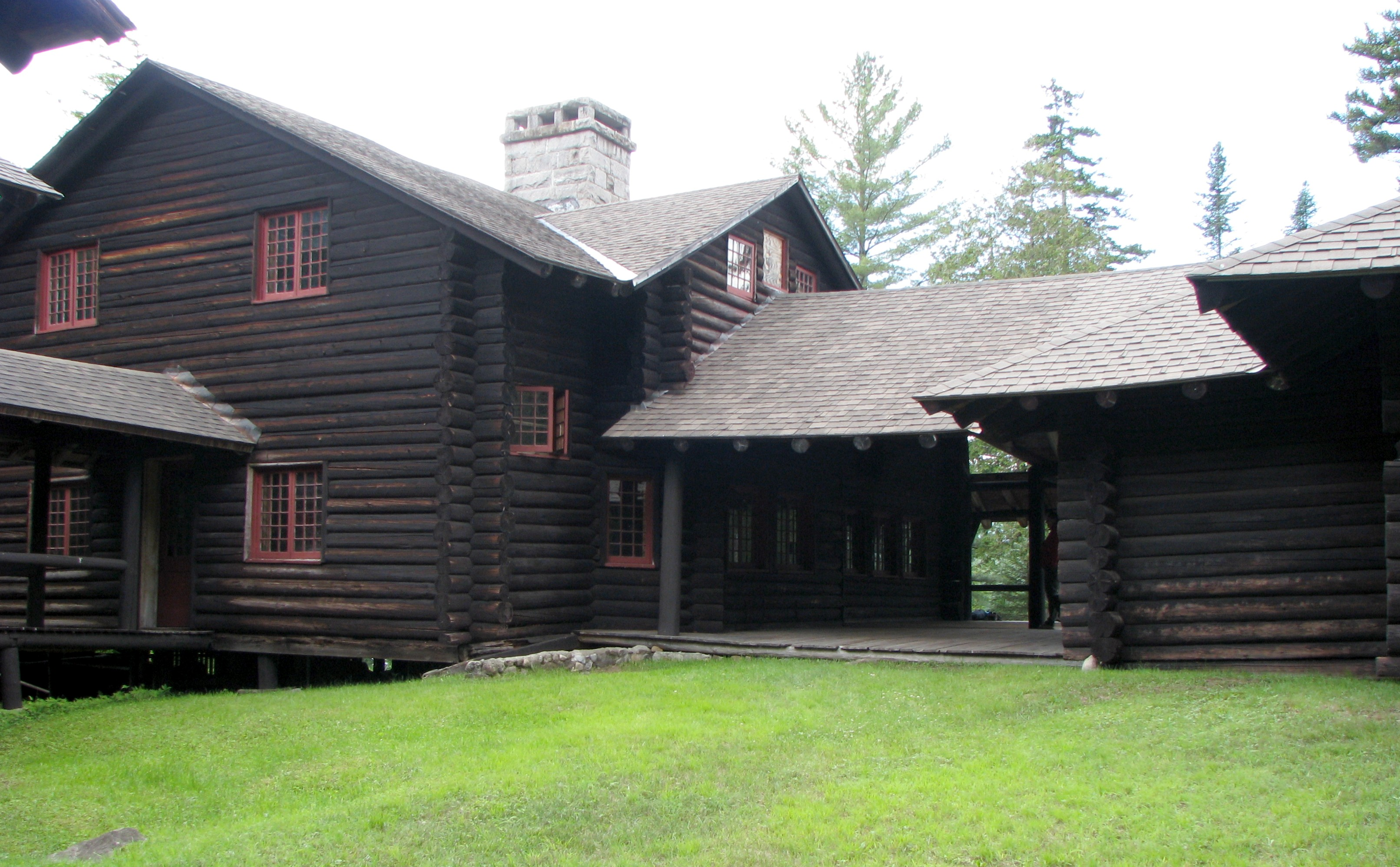
Camp Santanoni main lodge, for Robert C. Pruyn (built 1892–93)

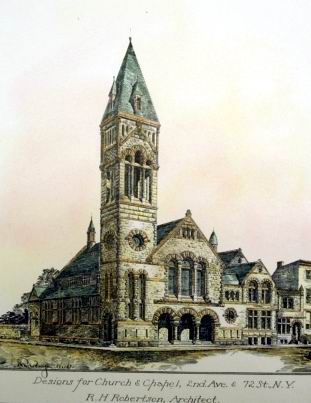
Robertson's 1886 designs for a church on the Upper East Side of Manhattan. The main church was never built, but the chapel was, as Knox Presbyterian Church, now St. John the Martyr Roman Catholic Church (Manhattan).

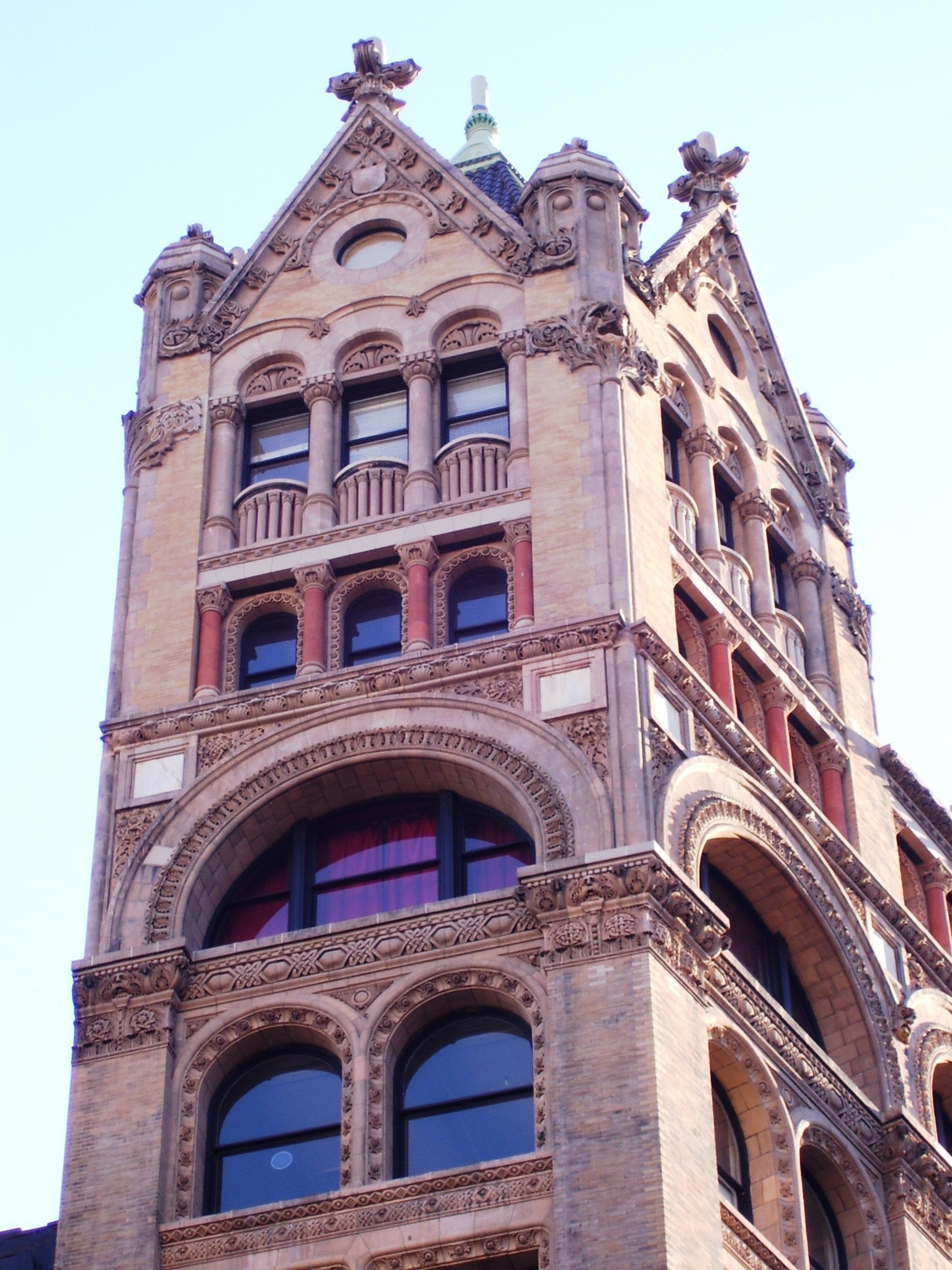
The "eclectic" MacIntyre Building at 874 Broadway (built 1890–92) contains Byzantine, Romanesque and Gothic elements

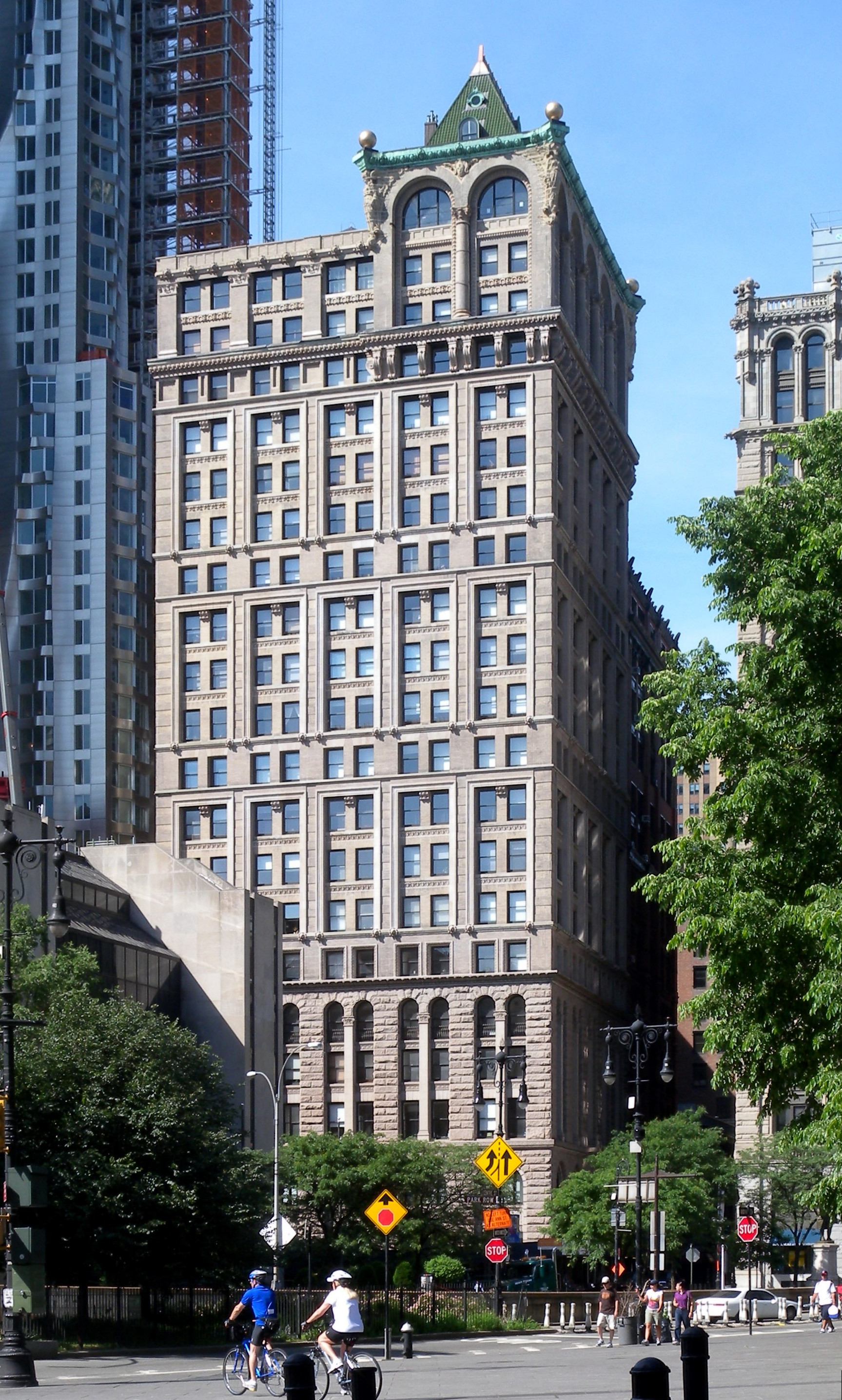
American Tract Society Building at 150 Nassau Street (built 1894–1895)

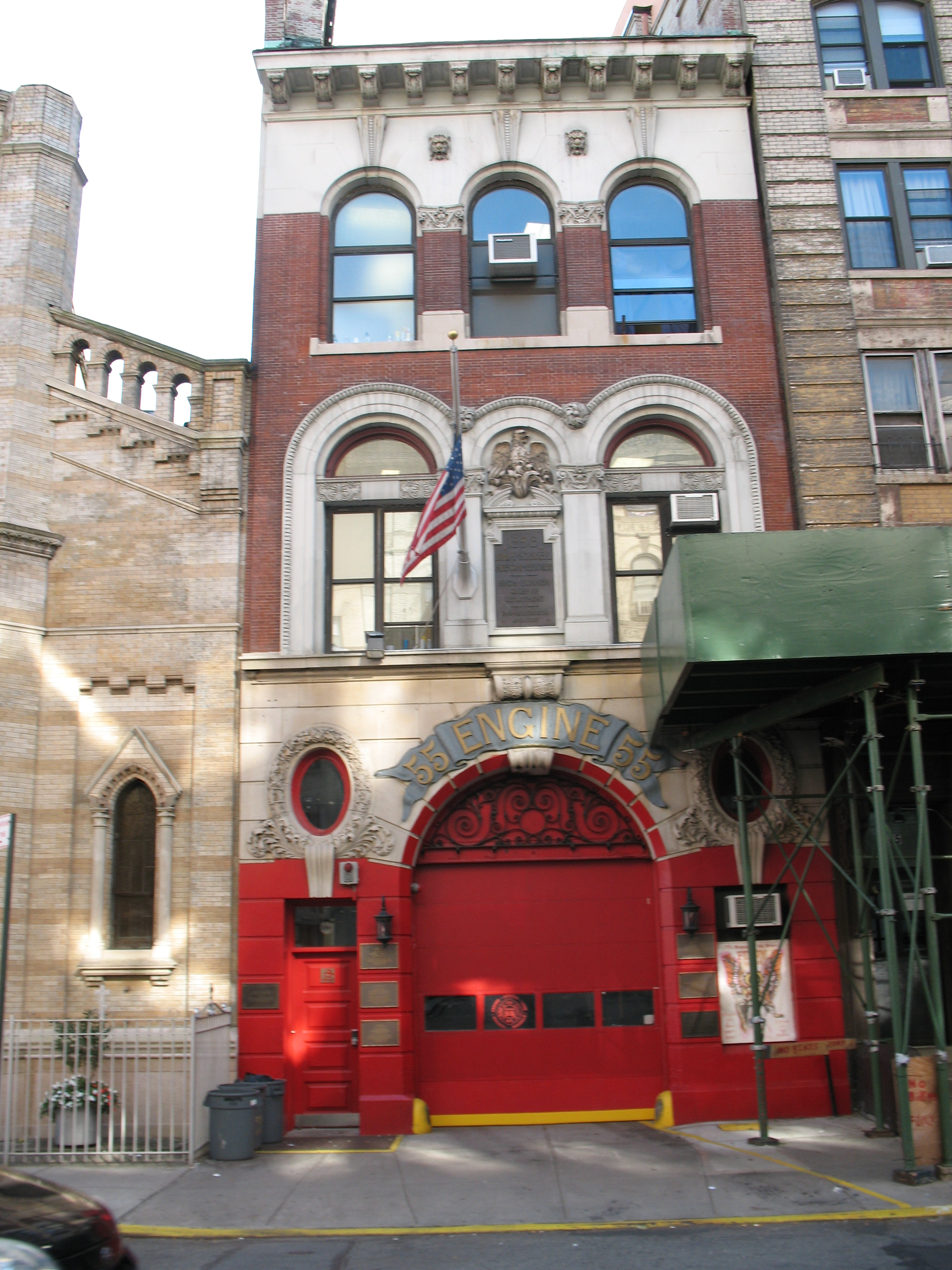
Engine Company 55 Firehouse at 363 Broome Street (completed 1895)

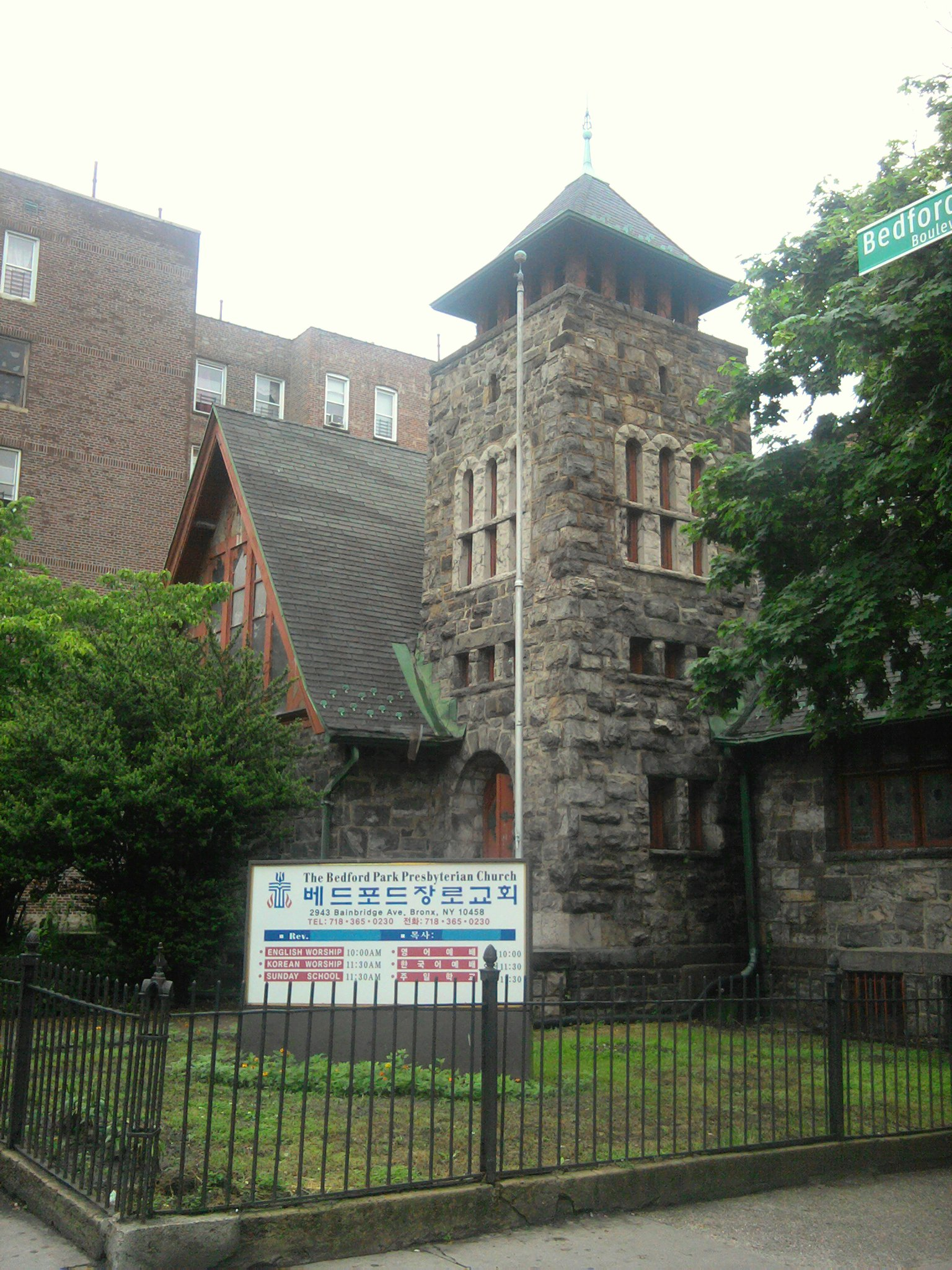
Bedford Park Presbyterian Church

Robert Henderson Robertson (April 29, 1849 – June 3, 1919) was an American architect who designed numerous houses, institutional and commercial buildings, and churches. He is known for his wide-variety of works and commissions, ranging from private residences such as Jacqueline Kennedy's childhood home Hammersmith Farm and the Adirondacks Great Camp Santanoni, great civic buildings like Southport's Pequot Library for the Marquand Family to some of the earliest steel skyscrapers in New York City.

Robertson was one of the architects of choice for the late nineteenth century titans of industry, and designed several buildings for the extended Vanderbilt Family, including Shelburne Farms and the outbuildings at the Vanderbilt Mansion National Historic Site.

== Life and career ==
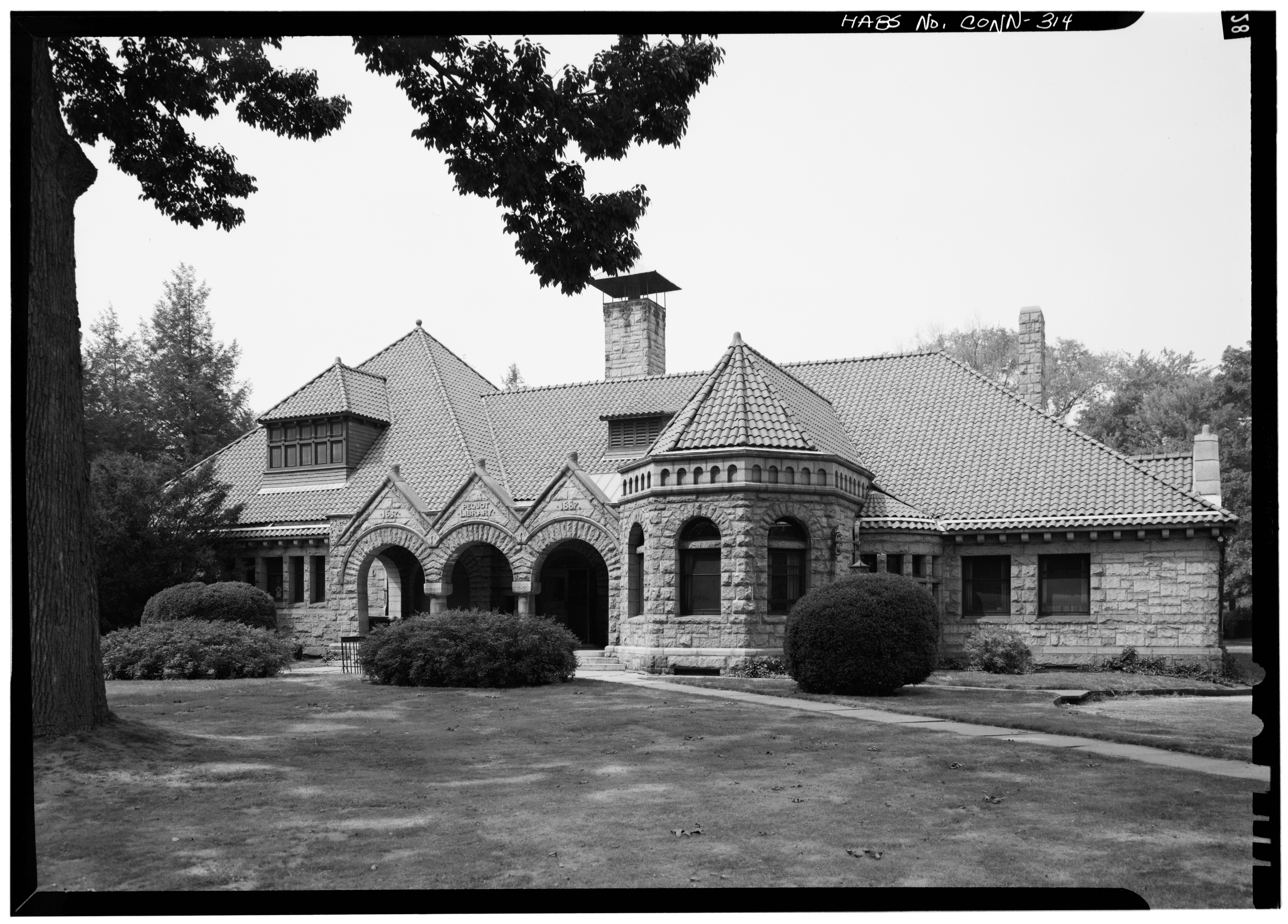
Pequot Library Association (1894)

Robertson was born in Philadelphia to Scottish parents Archibald Robertson and Elizabeth Henderson. He was educated in Scotland, then graduated from Rutgers College in 1869. He apprenticed for several years in Philadelphia with Henry A. Sims, then moved to New York to work, first for George B. Post, then in 1873-74 for Edward Tuckerman Potter. Having completed one of the first houses in America to manifest the "Queen Anne style", a cottage for Theodore Timson in Sea Bright, New Jersey (1875), he formed a partnership with Potter's half-brother, William Appleton Potter, who had also trained with Post. Their partnership lasted from 1875 to 1881, during which time they worked mostly in a free Gothic Revival style, with Robertson as the junior partner responsible for the firm's residential commissions. In the 1880s, working on his own, he fell under the influence of H.H. Richardson's "Richardsonian Romanesque" a freely-handled revival style that depended for its effect on strong massing and the bold use of rustication. In 1894, he finished construction of Southport's Pequot Library Association. Founded by the influential Marquand and Monroe families, Pequot Library is a special collections institution. In the 1890s, in the wake of the "White City" of the World's Columbian Exposition, Chicago, he began to work in a classical style.

He married Charlotte Markoe and they had one son. Their son, Thomas Markoe Robertson would also become an architect and in 1924 marry Cordelia Biddle Duke, formerly Mrs. Angier Buchanan Duke.

Robertson died on June 3, 1919, at William S. Webb's Adirondack lodge in Nehasane, Hamilton County, New York, which he had designed. He is buried in Southampton, New York.

== Commissions ==
=== Potter & Robertson (1875-1881) ===
During his New York partnership with William Appleton Potter the firm designed many summer vacation cottages in Newport, Rhode Island, and the Jersey Shore, beginning with the Bryce Gray residence in Long Branch, New Jersey (completed c. 1877; since demolished). Potter & Robertson also designed:

- South Congregational Church (1871–1875) – Springfield, Massachusetts.
- Phillips Presbyterian Church (1873)
- Stuart Hall (1875–77) – Princeton Theological Seminary.
- Witherspoon Hall (1875–77) – Princeton University.
- Brown University Library (1875) – Providence, Rhode Island.
- University Hotel (1875–77; demolished) – Princeton, New Jersey.
- Grace Church Chapel (completed 1876; demolished) – East 14th Street; the third chapel for Grace Church, and the second on this site, replacing one that burned down in 1872.
- Alpha Kappa Lodge (1876) – Williams College, Williamstown, Massachusetts.
- St. Augustine's Episcopal Church and Mission House (1876–77) – 107 East Houston Street.
- Commodore Charles H. Baldwin House (1877–78) – Newport, Rhode Island; a multi-gabled essay in the Queen Anne style showing the influence of Norman Shaw, and H. H. Richardson's Newport residence for William Watts Sherman (1874–76).
- "Hillside", also known as the Adam-Derby House (1878) – Oyster Bay, New York, for Sarah Sampson Adam. The partnership's only documented house on the Long Island Gold Coast is also in the Queen Anne style.
- Christ Episcopal Church (1878) – Oyster Bay, Long Island; altered by Delano & Aldrich in 1925, who encased the domestic-looking church in stone.
- St. James Protestant Episcopal Chapel, known as the Church of the Presidents (1879) – Long Branch, New Jersey.

=== Solo career (1881-1902) ===
Robertson's Park Row Building (completed 1899) at 15 Park Row, built for August Belmont, was, for a brief period, the world's tallest office building. Among his many other commissions in New York City and elsewhere:

- St. James Episcopal Church (completed 1881) – East 71st Street & Madison Avenue. Altered by Ralph Adams Cram and others. The tower collapsed and was replaced by a spire in 1950.
- Church of the Holy Spirit (1881–83; demolished 1905) – 775 Madison Avenue.
- Madison Avenue Presbyterian Church (1881–84; demolished) – East 60th Street & Madison Avenue.
- 23 East 67th Street (1882–83) – Redesigned in the neo-Federal style and an additional storey added by Sterner and Wolfe in 1919.
- Mott Haven (138th Street) Railroad Station (1885–86; demolished).
- YWCA Building (1885–87) – 7-11 East 15th Street. Now used by the Soka Gakkai International-USA Cultural Center, the Buddhist Association for Peace, Culture and Education.
- Drew Theological Seminary Library (completed 1886) – Madison, New Jersey. Published in The American Architect and Building News 20 March 1886.
- "Sunnymede", Dr. Francis H. Markoe house (1886–87) – Southampton, Long Island. Dr Markoe was Robertson's brother-in-law.
- Knox Presbyterian Church (completed 1887) – 252 East 72nd Street, now known as St. John the Martyr Roman Catholic Church (Manhattan).
- Bushnell House (1887–88) – 838 East High Street, Springfield, Ohio. Built for Asa Bushnell and his wife Ellen, and now a funeral home, the Bushnell House exemplifies Robertson's Richardsonian Romanesque style. It is part of Springfield's East High Street Historic District, which is listed on the National Register of Historic Places.
- "Wyndcote", Robertson's residence (1887–88) – Southampton, Long Island.
- Phelps Stokes-J.P. Morgan, Jr. House (completed 1888) – 231 Madison Avenue; Robertson significantly enlarged this Italianate mansion, which was originally built in 1852-53. A New York City landmark.
- Christ Church (1887–89) – Poughkeepsie, New York.
- "Hammersmith Farm" (1887–89) – Newport, Rhode Island, for John W. Auchincloss.
- Jan Hus Bohemian Brethren Church (1888) – 347 East 74th Street.
- Rutgers Presbyterian Church Chapel (1888) – West 73rd Street; named after the same man, Col. Henry Rutgers, as Rutgers University.
- Margaret Louisa Home (1889–91) – 14-16 East 16th Street.
- St. Luke's Episcopal Church (1889–90) – 73 South Fullerton Avenue, Montclair, New Jersey.
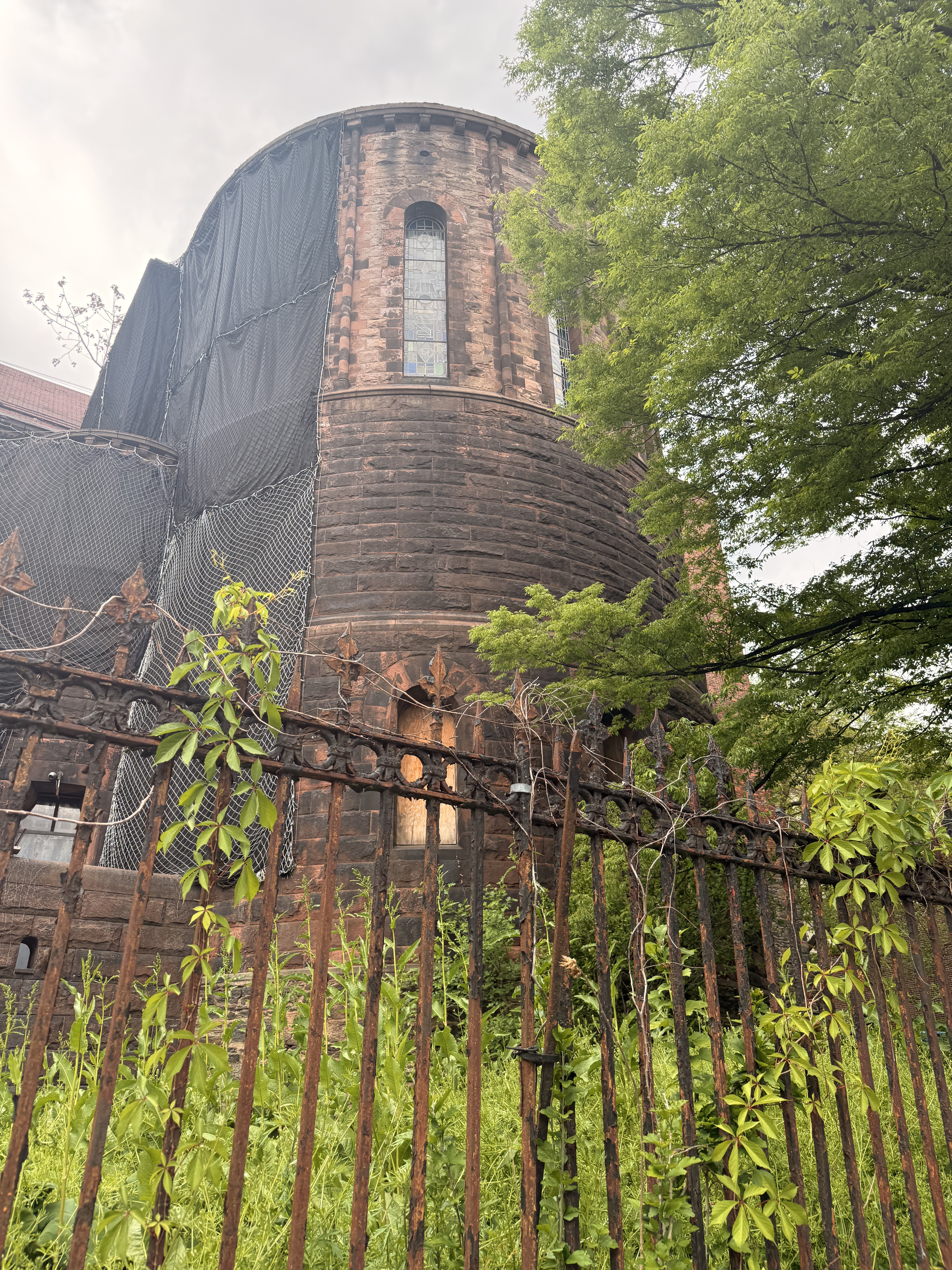
- St. Luke's Episcopal Church (1892)- Hamilton Heights, New York
- 13 East 71st Street (1891–92) – town house.
- Church of the Messiah and Incarnation (1892) – Greene Avenue, Brooklyn. Completed the design of James H. Giles.
- St Luke's Church (completed 1892) – Convent Avenue, Hamilton Heights (Manhattan). Within the Hamilton Heights Historic District.
- Pequot Library (1893) – Southport, Connecticut. Meticulously restored in 2008.
- American Tract Society Building (1894–95) – 150 Nassau Street. Combining elements of Renaissance Revival and Romanesque Revival styles, this is one of the earliest steel-framed structures. It is clad in gray Westerly granite, gray Roman brick and tan architectural terracotta. A New York City landmark.
- Engine Company 55 Firehouse, Fire Department of New York (completed 1895) – 363 Broome Street, Manhattan. The building is a New York City landmark.
- New York Savings Bank (1896–97) – Eighth Avenue at West 14th Street (northwest corner). The grand Roman banking hall was occupied for several years by a carpet merchant, and then by the upscale grocer, Balducci's (2005-2009). It and its sibling across 14th Street serve as New York's gemelli churches. A New York City landmark.
- Academy of Medicine (completed 1889; demolished) – 17 West 43rd Street.
- Rutgers Riverside Presbyterian Church (1889–90; demolished) – Broadway and West 73rd Street. The church was replaced by the current structure.
- Lincoln Building (1889–90) – 1-3 Union Square West. A New York City landmark.
- MacIntyre Building (1890–92) – 874 Broadway, lofts, the AIA Guide to New York City (4th ed.) calls refers to the building's style as "unspeakable eclectic"
- United Charities Building (1891–1892) – East 22nd Street and Park Avenue South, designed with Rowe & Baker.
- Mohawk Building (1891–92) – 160 Fifth Avenue.
- Mendelssohn Hall (1891–92) – West 40th Street. The hall was designed for the Mendelssohn Glee Club.*...First Congregational Church of St. Albans, 27 Church St., St. Albans, Vermont 1892-1894 completed 1894.
- Church of St Paul and Parish House (1895–97) – 540 West End Avenue at West 86th Street. Tuscan Renaissance in tan brick and limestone, with an octagonal campanile at the corner. The AIA Guide to New York City (4th ed.) calls this church, with its octagonal corner tower, "a startling work." It's now the Church of St. Paul and St. Andrew and is shared with Congregation B'nai Jeshurun. A New York City landmark.
- First Reformed Dutch Church (1896–1897) – Somerville, New Jersey.
- Fourth Universalist Society in the City of New York (1898) – Central Park West and 76th Street. Mosaic in interior.
- Moses Allen and Alice Dunning Starr House (1897–99) – 5 West 54th Street; a New York City landmark.
- Bedford Park Presbyterian Church (1900) – Bedford Park Boulevard, the Bronx.
- Lying-in Hospital (1902) – 305 Second Avenue between East 17th and 18th Streets, now "Rutherford Place", apartments and offices.
- Corn Exchange Bank Building
- Shelburne Farms – Shelburne, Vermont. Shelburne House, the Breeding Barn, the Farm Barn and the Coach Barn make up Robertson's most ambitious farm complex. Robertson designed the adjacent Shelburne Railroad Station (1890).
- Camp Santanoni Main Camp Complex – Newcomb, New York; for Robert C. Pruyn of Albany, a Yale classmate of Robertson's. The first Adirondack camp to be comprehensively designed as a unit by a professional architect.

=== Robertson & Potter (1902-1919) ===
In 1902, Robertson took on as partner Robert Burnside Potter (1869-1934), nephew of William Potter. They designed a cottage, perhaps several, for Regis H. Post in Bayside, Long Island.

- Hugh D. Auchincloss House (1903) – 33 East 67th Street.
- House of Relief Ambulance Annex (1907–08) – 9 Jay Street, was attached by an enclosed overhead bridge to the House of Relief, New York Hospital across Staple Street; within the Tribeca Historic District.
