= Church of the Presidents (New Jersey) =

Historic church in New Jersey, United States

- U.S. National Register of Historic Places
- New Jersey Register of Historic Places
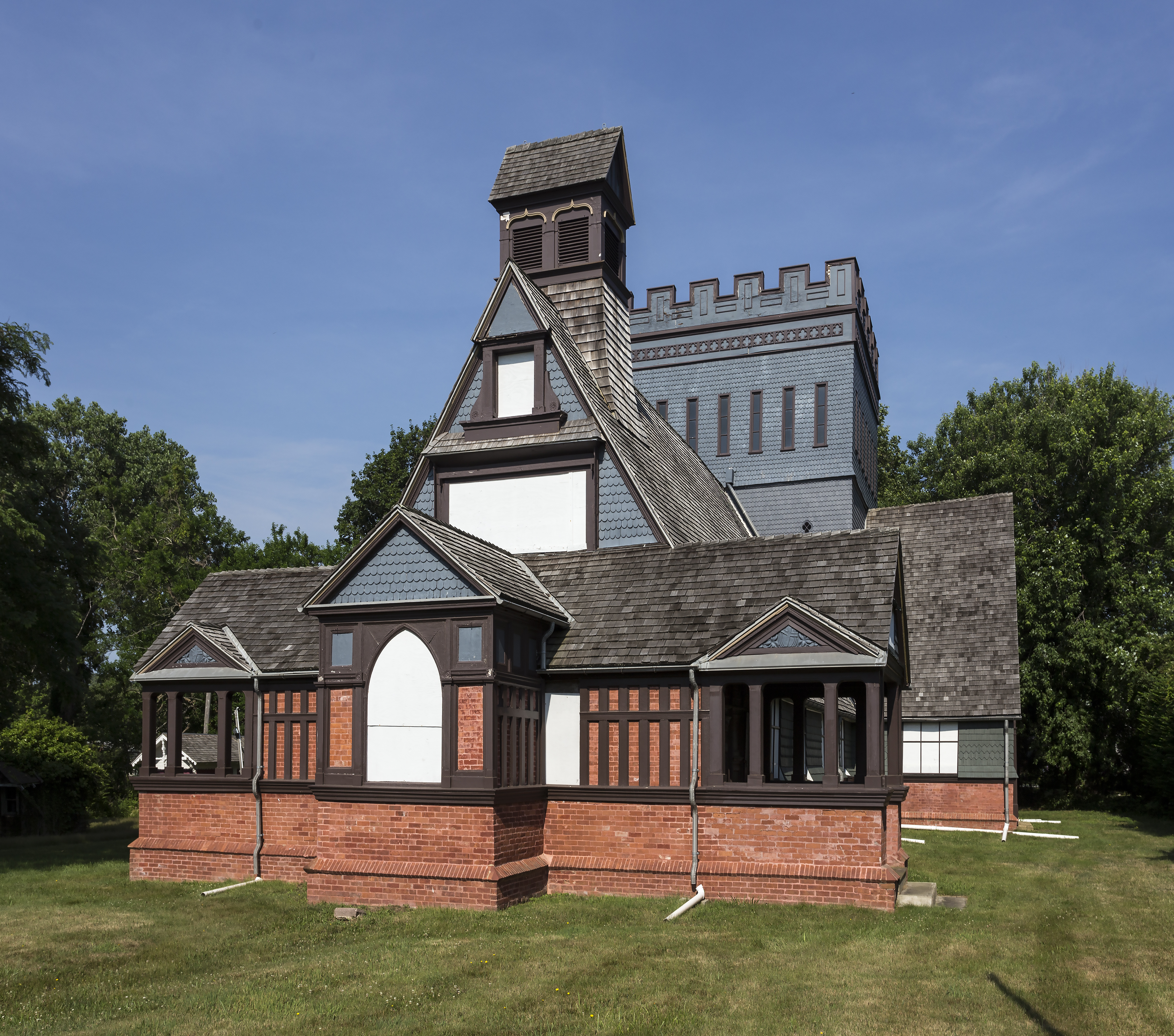
- View of the chapel in 2016 after substantial restoration work

- Location within Monmouth County, New Jersey Location within New Jersey Location within the United States
- Location: 1260 Ocean Avenue, Long Branch, New Jersey
- Coordinates: 40°15′46″N 73°59′25″W
- Area: 0.1 acres (0.040 ha)
- Built: 1879
- Architect: William Appleton Potter and Robert Henderson Robertson
- Architectural style: Carpenter Gothic
- NRHP reference No.: 76001169
- NJRHP No.: 2006

Significant dates
- Added to NRHP: November 07, 1976
- Designated NJRHP: October 17, 1975

The Church of the Presidents is a former Episcopal chapel of ease on the Jersey Shore where seven United States presidents worshipped. It was visited by presidents Ulysses S. Grant, Rutherford B. Hayes, James A. Garfield, Chester A. Arthur, Benjamin Harrison, William McKinley, and Woodrow Wilson. All except Grant were in office when they paid their visits to the church.

For approximately 75 years it was a seasonal summer resort church, located at 1260 Ocean Avenue in Long Branch, Monmouth County, New Jersey, United States, just across the street from the Atlantic Ocean. In 1953 the Episcopal Diocese deconsecrated the church and slated it for demolition. Local preservationists stepped in and in 1955 the old chapel was rededicated as the Long Branch Historical Museum. Today the building is undergoing extensive structural repairs and renovations. It is closed to the public.

== History ==
The Church of the Presidents was consecrated in 1879 as St. James Protestant Episcopal Chapel, a branch of St. James Episcopal Church, located elsewhere in Long Branch, New Jersey. The church picked up its nickname following the visits of so many chief executives.

The chapel was designed in the Carpenter Gothic style by the New York architectural firm of William Appleton Potter, and Robert Henderson Robertson. The firm was famous in the era for designing South Congregational Church, Springfield, Massachusetts (1871-1875) and the Brown University Library (1875). The men also designed summer homes on the Jersey Shore.

In the 19th century, Long Branch was considered the Monte Carlo of America. A white flag was raised when women went in the ocean; a red pennant was hoisted to begin the males-only sessions. In August 1861, Mary Todd Lincoln took a vacation in Long Branch and began a tradition of dignitaries from the nation's capital to become regular guests. From the Gilded Age up until the era before World War I, Long Branch was one of the nation's premier summer vacation spots, drawing the wealthy to its stately large homes.

The Church of the Presidents was where the wealthy summer residents worshipped. Famous families such as the Goulds, Vanderbilts, Sloans, and Drexels had palatial summer residences nearby. A newspaper reporter in 1886 estimated that the net worth of a small group of Sunday morning congregants was more than $250 million. During summertime in the Gay Nineties, an $8,000 Sunday collection was not unusual. However, by 1925 the chapel was in dire financial straits, and only by generous contributions of local townspeople was it saved. A New York real estate magnate, Henry Levy, paid off its back taxes, despite not being a member of the church, or a Christian. He remarked, "Although we are not of the same faith, we believe in the same God." This was only a temporary reprieve for the church.

In 1949 services at the once-crowded house of worship ceased, due to the congregation having dwindled to less than 40 members. The Rev. Christopher H. Snyder, the chapel's vicar, undertook a campaign to ask Congress to name the site a national shrine. National attention soon followed. It was acquired by the non-profit Long Branch Historical Museum Association in 1953. For the next 46 years it was operated as a local museum and open periodically. However, after 120 years of harsh weather conditions so close to the ocean, the building itself deteriorated.

The museum fell into disrepair and was closed in 1999. In 2003, private donations helped stabilize the building. The unique windows were removed and placed in storage, along with a number of historic items, including a silk American flag that covered President Garfield's casket, President Grant's gun cabinet, and the chapel's guest books that were signed by the presidents.

The church has been named as an official project of the National Trust for Historic Preservation's Save America's Treasures program. This designation recognizes the historic value and critical condition of the site, and makes it eligible for, but does not ensure, funding. It was added to the National Register of Historic Places on November 7, 1976, for its significance in politics and religion.

== Architectural features ==
- The Carpenter Gothic chapel is a wooden structure on a brick masonry base.
- Two stained glass windows identified as works by the Louis Comfort Tiffany Studios were installed in the 19th century.
- The roof is made from cedar shake. A new ethylene propylene diene monomer rubber seal was installed on the building's tower in 2007.
- Decorative quatrefoils on the outside perimeter of the parapet are of Spanish mahogany.
- The building remained unchanged from 1879 to 1895, when an imposing crenellated tower was added.
- Also on the chapel property is a small building called The Garfield Tea House. It was built from railroad ties that were laid in 1881 to create a rail spur to transport the mortally wounded President Garfield from the Elberon train depot to the Francklyn cottage, where he died.

== Renovation ==
The Church of the Presidents is the last remaining structure associated with all seven presidents who vacationed in Long Branch. In 1999 the Long Branch Historical Museum Association began fundraising efforts to save the building. The first step was to stabilize the building to prevent it from collapsing. The wood flooring was removed and reinforced concrete was poured to support the building. Steel supports replaced wooden pilasters that had deteriorated. The stained-glass windows, original altar, organ, and handmade pews were removed and put in storage during renovation.

Following the stabilization of the building in 2003, work began on the exterior. The wood frame was repaired, missing pieces were replaced, new gutters and a drainage system were installed, and the belfry was renovated. In 2007, a new cedar shake roof was completed.

In 2007 the Monmouth County Historical Commission awarded a grant to repair the north-facing portico porch. Previous grants from the MCHC were used to install new rain gutters, to restore the Garfield Tea House, the church bell, and belfry.

Currently, the Long Branch Historical Museum Association is undertaking fundraising efforts to finish the renovation before the Church of the Presidents can re-open to the public.

== Gallery ==
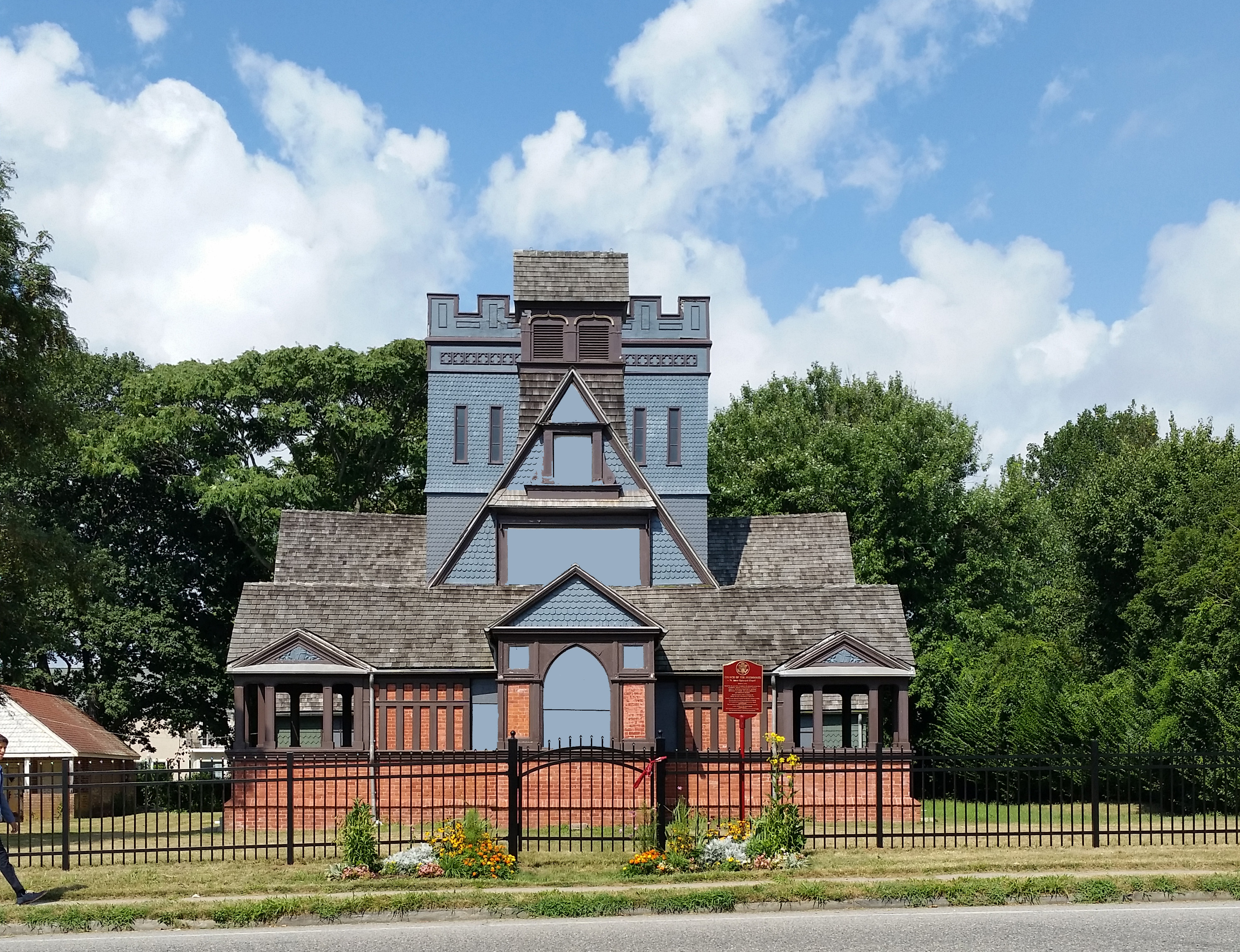
2016 The addition of a new fence and garden.

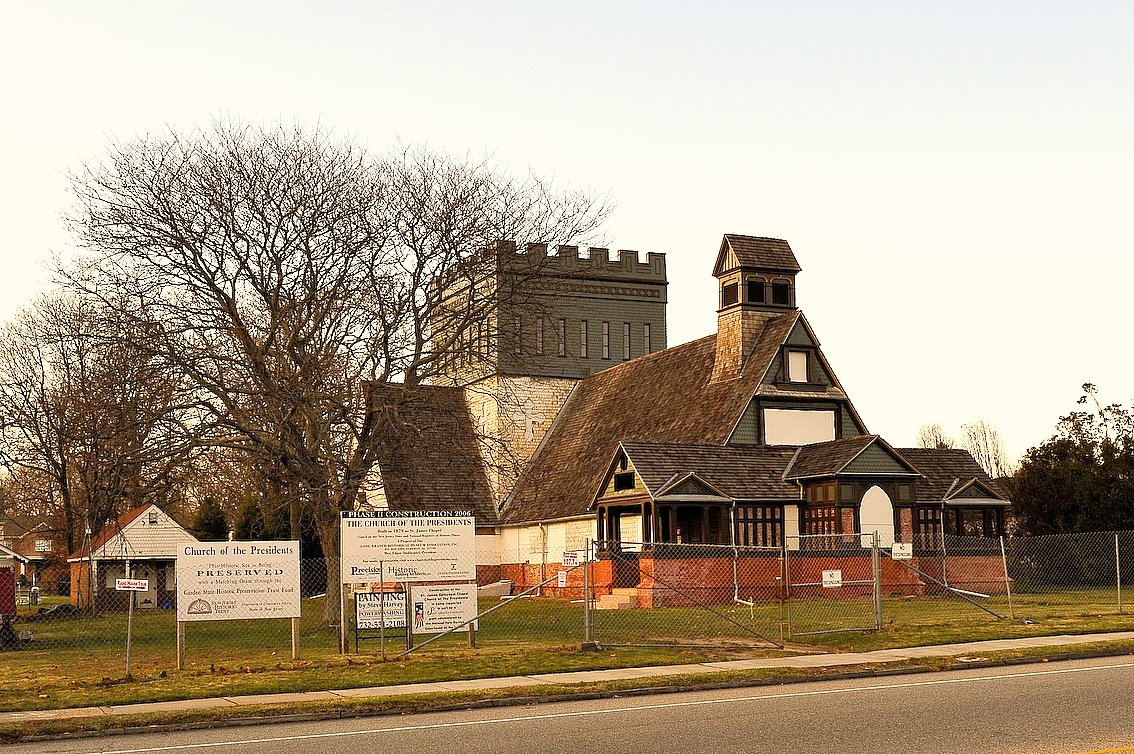
Church of the Presidents Dec 2008

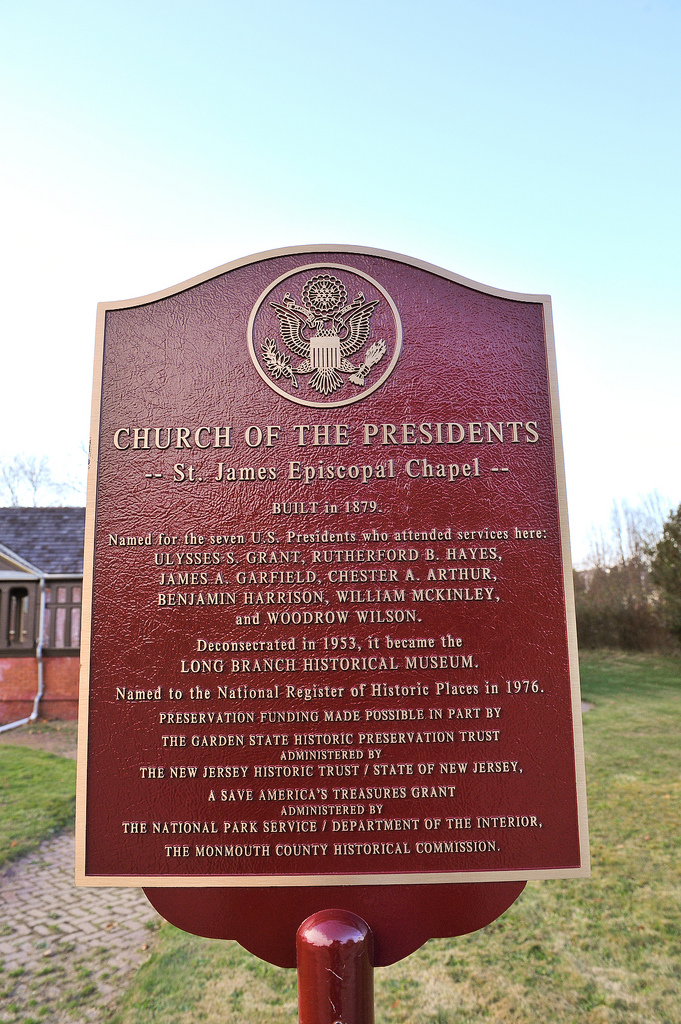
Church of the Presidents Historical Marker

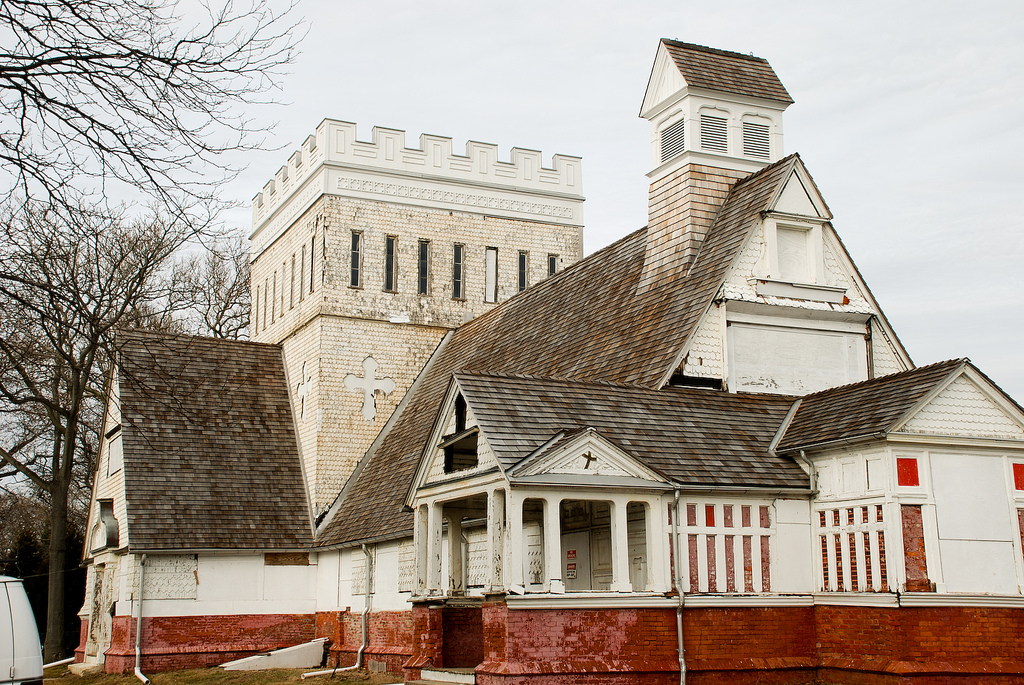
Building detail, Church of the Presidents Dec 2008

== See also ==
- National Register of Historic Places listings in Monmouth County, New Jersey
