= The Research Board =

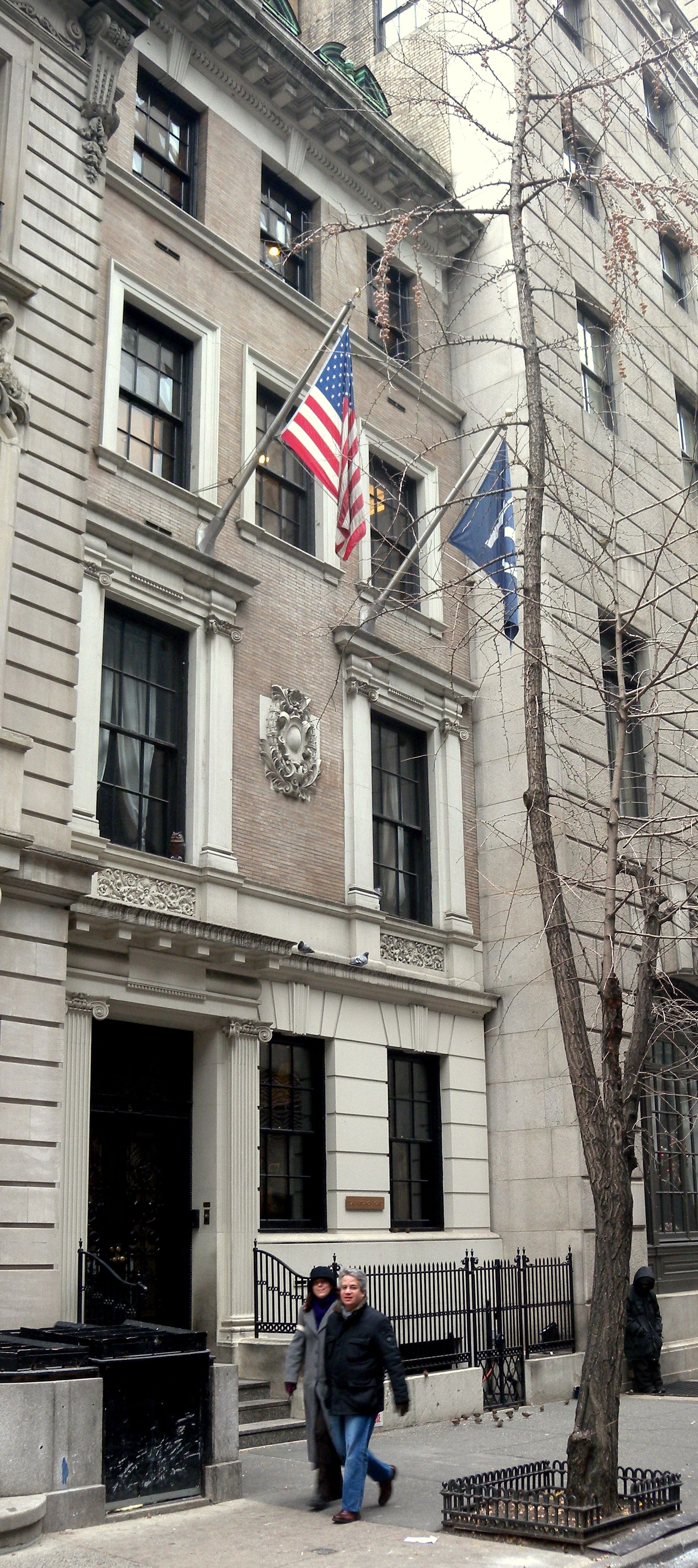
Former Moses Allen and Alice Dunning Starr House, now The Research Board.

The Research Board, sometimes referred to as the Gartner Research Board, is a consulting firm and research service. Membership is limited to CIOs at large corporations.

== History ==
The Research Board was founded in 1973 by Ernest von Simson and Naomi Seligman. Membership in the group was limited to the executives of large IT companies. Personnel associated with IT vendors were not allowed to be members.

The Research Group published analytical reports about information systems, which members would discuss at in-person meetings. In 1984, The New York Times described the Research Board as a "low-profile New York group composed of chief data processing executives of 50 of the nation's largest corporations." A decade later The Times described it as "a high-tech consulting firm."

In 1998, Gartner acquired the Research Board. In 2006, CEO Peter Sole stated that although the organization was owned by Gartner, it operated independently and research remained limited to members.

== See also ==
- Gartner
