= 712 Fifth Avenue =

Office skyscraper in Manhattan, New York

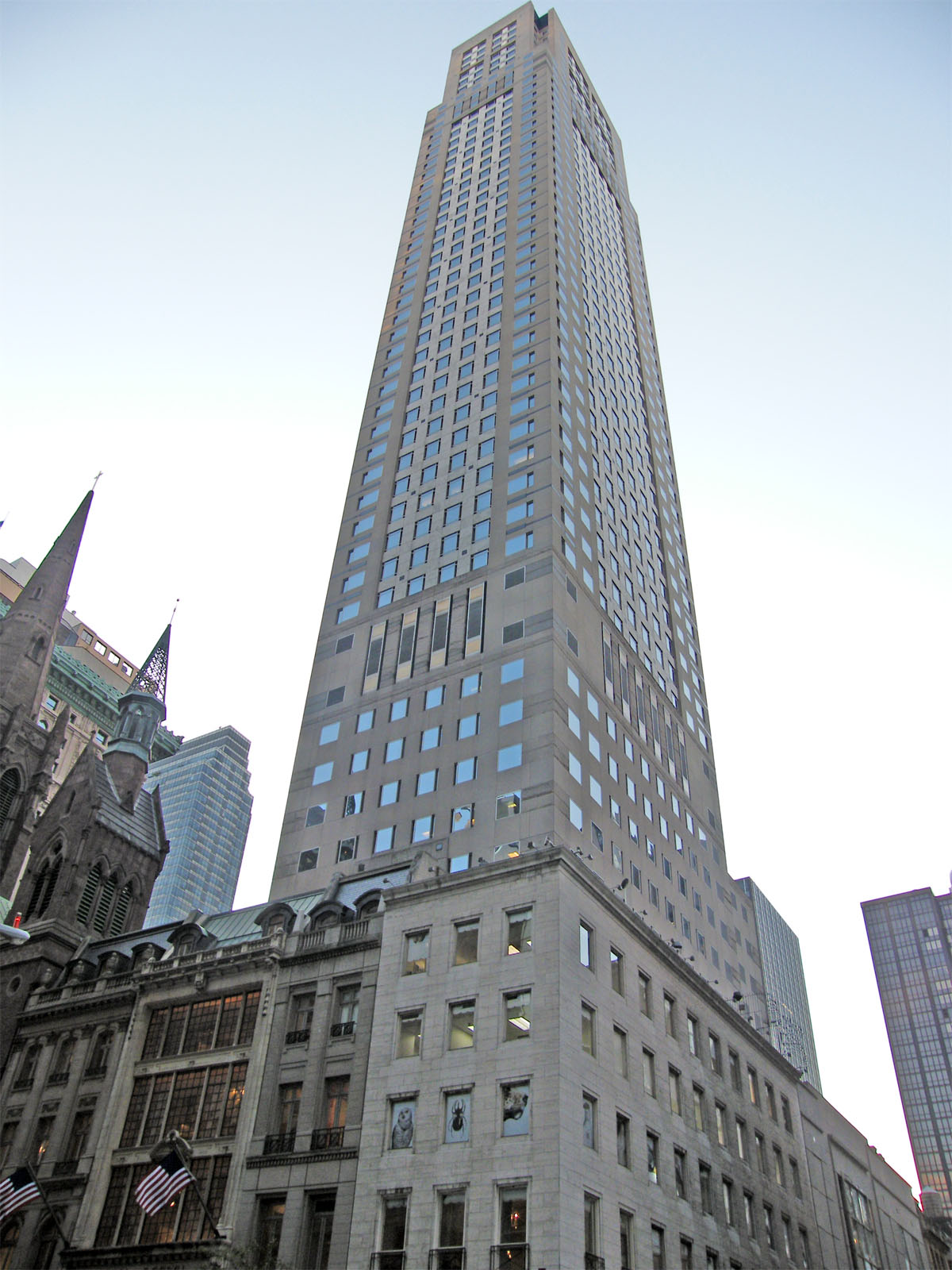
- Interactive map of the 712 Fifth Avenue area

General information
- Status: Completed
- Type: Office
- Architectural style: Postmodern
- Location: Manhattan, New York, U.S.
- Coordinates: 40°45′44″N 73°58′30″W
- Construction started: 1987
- Completed: 1989
- Cost: $399 million
- Owner: Bannister Trust
- Management: Paramount Group

Height
- Roof: 650 ft (200 m)

Technical details
- Floor count: 52
- Floor area: 544,998 ft^{2} (50,632.0 m^{2})
- Lifts/elevators: 11

Design and construction
- Architects: SLCE Architects, Kohn Pedersen Fox Associates
- Structural engineer: Severud Associates Consulting Engineers

New York City Landmark
- Designated: January 29, 1985
- Reference no.: 1533
- Designated entity: Rizzoli Building

712 Fifth Avenue is a 650-foot-tall (200 m) skyscraper at 56th Street and Fifth Avenue in the Midtown Manhattan neighborhood of New York City. Constructed from 1987 to 1990, it was designed by SLCE Architects and Kohn Pedersen Fox Associates. The skyscraper's base includes the Coty Building at 714 Fifth Avenue (built 1871) and the Rizzoli Bookstore building at 712 Fifth Avenue (built 1908), both of which are New York City designated landmarks.

The facades of the Coty and Rizzoli buildings are preserved at the base; an imitation facade was also built at 716 Fifth Avenue to complement the grouping. The lower floors contain a storefront and an atrium behind the landmark facades of the Coty and Rizzoli buildings. The tower stories contain a facade of white marble, gray limestone, and green and black granite. Inside the tower, each floor has 7,500 square feet (700 m^{2}) of office space on average. The newer tower's juxtaposition with the Coty and Rizzoli buildings was both praised and criticized by architectural writers such as Paul Goldberger and Christopher Gray.

Before the construction of the present skyscraper, 712 Fifth Avenue was the address of the Rizzoli Bookstore building. Planning for 712 Fifth Avenue dates to 1983, but the project was delayed for several years because of opposition to the demolition of historic structures at the skyscraper's base. The Coty and Rizzoli buildings were incorporated into the base, where a Henri Bendel store operated from 1990 until 2018. Upon completion, the skyscraper was mostly vacant because of a weak real-estate market. The building was sold in 1999 to the Paramount Group for a then-record $285 million.

== Site ==
712 Fifth Avenue is in the Midtown Manhattan neighborhood of New York City. It faces Fifth Avenue to the east and 56th Street to the north. The land lot is L-shaped and covers 17,555 square feet (1,630.9 m^{2}), with a frontage of 75 feet (23 m) on Fifth Avenue and a depth of 150 feet (46 m). It wraps around another structure at 718 Fifth Avenue, on the southeast corner of Fifth Avenue and 56th Street. The modern skyscraper spans what was formerly 12 separate parcels.

The building is on the same block as the townhouses at 10 and 12 West 56th Street to the west, as well as the Fifth Avenue Presbyterian Church to the south. Other nearby buildings include the Rockefeller Apartments to the southwest; The Peninsula New York hotel and the University Club of New York to the south; the St. Regis New York hotel and 689 Fifth Avenue to the southeast; the Corning Glass Building and 550 Madison Avenue to the east; Trump Tower, the Tiffany & Co. flagship store, and 590 Madison Avenue to the northeast; and 17 West 56th Street and the Crown Building to the north.

Fifth Avenue between 42nd Street and Central Park South (59th Street) was relatively undeveloped through the late 19th century. The western side of the avenue, between 55th and 56th streets, contained the Fifth Avenue Presbyterian Church at the 55th Street corner and a series of brownstone houses on the rest of the block. The church built a brownstone with the address 712 Fifth Avenue in 1886. By the early 1900s, that section of Fifth Avenue was becoming a commercial area.

== Architecture ==
712 Fifth Avenue includes a 52-story tower with 11 elevators and rises to a total height of 650 feet (200 m). The tower, constructed in 1989, was designed by Kohn Pedersen Fox (KPF) along with SLCE Architects. A. Eugene Kohn of KPF was the partner-in-charge, while William Pedersen was the design partner and Chao-Ming Wu was the senior designer. The building is a Leadership in Energy and Environmental Design basic silver certified structure. The skyscraper's base includes two preexisting structures: the Rizzoli Building (1907) and the Coty Building (1908). The rest of the base was built with the skyscraper itself.

=== Facade ===
==== Rizzoli Building ====
The five-story Rizzoli Building, designed by Albert S. Gottlieb, carried the address of 712 Fifth Avenue before the present skyscraper was built. Designed in the French classical style, the structure is about 120 feet (37 m) deep and is five stories tall with a limestone-and-brick facade. The facade is three bays wide, and at ground level, had a door in the rightmost bay. On the upper stories, the Rizzoli Building had a piano nobile with three full-height, arched windows, as well as balusters underneath each opening. There were also Rizzoli inscriptions above the second floor. The third and fourth floors' articulation was designed as a single unit, with each bay separated by pilasters containing Corinthian-style capitals; the windows on these floors are casement windows. The fifth floor is within a black slate mansard roof, recessed behind a stone balustrade.

==== Coty Building ====
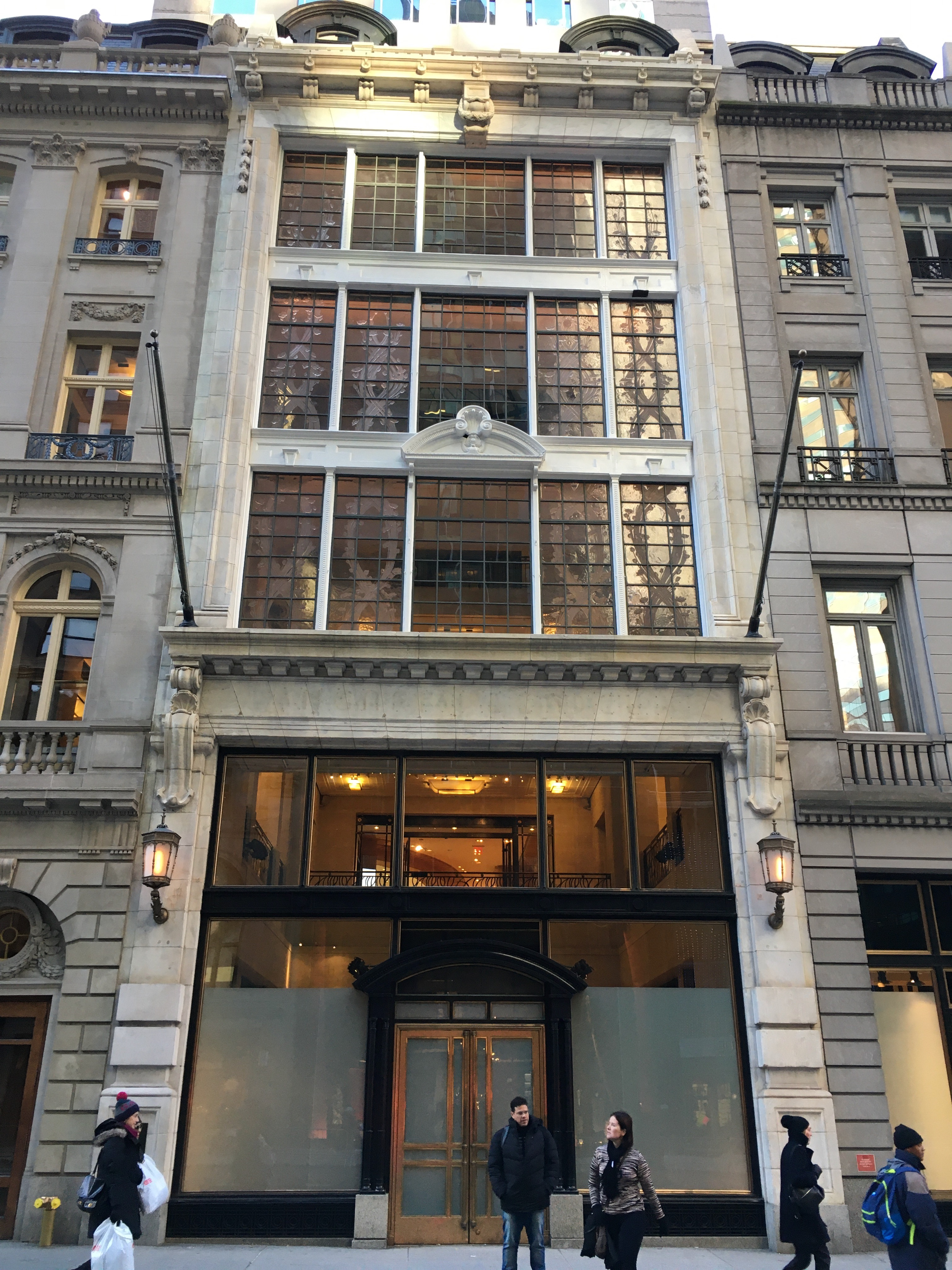
The Coty Building, with the Rizzoli Building at left and the 716 Fifth Avenue facade to the right

The six-story Coty Building at 714 Fifth Avenue was redesigned by Woodruff Leeming and is designed as a frame around a glass wall. The first two stories have limestone-faced piers and a cornice. The third through the fifth stories are also treated as one unit, as a wall of glass. The glass windows were designed by René Lalique and comprise the only documented work by that architect in the United States. There are five vertical window bays, separated by thin vertical steel mullions. The top floor is set off by a modillioned cornice with console brackets supporting a balustrade. The sloping metal-covered roof with its arched dormers allowed the building to harmonize with its neighbors.

==== Skyscraper addition ====
The rest of the skyscraper's base is made of solid masonry clad with rough Indiana limestone and is five stories tall. On Fifth Avenue, a two-bay-wide, five-story neoclassical facade was built north of the Coty Building. It serves as a "bookend" to the Coty facade and is similar to the facade of the Rizzoli Building. The detailing consists of more superficial two-dimensional forms, in contrast to the three-dimensional forms used in the Rizzoli Building. It contains a cornice that continues onto the cornice line of the Coty Building. The main entrance on 56th Street consists of a classical-style loggia. It contains a two-story etched glass window with depictions of zodiac signs. This window, designed by Thierry Bruet and Amy Rassinforf, is designed as an imitation of the Lalique windows at the Coty Building.

The tower contains a 50-foot (15 m) setback from Fifth Avenue and a 27-foot (8.2 m) setback from 56th Street. The tower's facade is made of gray Indiana limestone, white Vermont marble, and green and black granite, with an aluminum curtain wall. On the intermediate stories of the tower, there are ten window bays per floor on the north and south facades and eight bays on the east and west facades. The two outer bays on each side are set within limestone, and the windows between the outermost bays are accented by black granite strips between each floor. The windows themselves are arranged in a grid, contrasting with the stone. The outer bays have narrow horizontal sidelights made of black granite. The inner bays on each side are faced with Vermont marble, recessed slightly behind the outer bays. The mullions of the inner bays' windows reflect those of the Coty Building facade. The Vermont marble is cut into 2-inch-thick (51 mm) slabs; the builders initially intended to cut the marble into 4-inch-thick slabs, but slabs of that thickness were prone to cracking.

The architects chose to use limestone for its buff color, which would lighten over time. The limestone is cut into 4-inch-thick (100 mm) slabs. Because it was the weakest type of stone used on the facade, the limestone slabs are anchored via steel angles to an exterior wall behind them, made of steel and concrete. Horizontal bands of rusticated limestone wrap around the tower at the 14th and 15th floors (Note: Gaskie 1992, p. 91, cites the 15th and 16th floors as having rusticated bands.) and at the 43rd and 44th floors. These strips indicate the locations of the mechanical stories. There are thermal-finished quoins, made of green granite, at the base and at the top of the tower. At the top, there are bronze medallions.

=== Interior ===
712 Fifth Avenue has 545,000 square feet (50,600 m^{2}) of space in total, though the gross square footage is 472,000 square feet (43,900 m^{2}). The main lobby is decorated with imitation-historic details such as a mail chute with a mirror finish. The lobby also contains modern details such as a curving Portuguese-limestone bench and a 14-foot-tall (4.3 m), curved glass wall. All of the ground-level structures are internally connected. Behind the facade of the Coty Building is a four-story atrium, which contains marble and French limestone finishes. In 1988, during the development of the current skyscraper, the developers signed a written agreement in which the atrium could not be used for retail. Furthermore, the second through fourth floors were designed with a direct view of the atrium. These stories were originally taken up by a 79,000-square-foot (7,300 m^{2}) Henri Bendel store. The store was designed with two elliptical staircases, as well as iron-railed balconies surrounding the atrium.

The upper floors are intended for boutique tenants, such as fashion companies. Each of the upper stories has a typical floor area of 7,500 square feet (700 m^{2}). Granite, marble, wood, and glass are used for decorations within the tower stories. Real-estate magazine The Real Deal said that the building's appeal to fashion companies came from the fact that "few views beat those from the towers of 712 Fifth Avenue".

The skyscraper has a concrete-tube frame to stiffen it against wind. The concrete cladding is 4.5 inches (110 mm) thick on average and is placed along the tower's exterior, not connected to the core. The elevator shafts and emergency stairs were placed in one corner of the building. Weight loads from the upper stories are carried around the base to avoid placing loads on the Coty and Rizzoli buildings. Loads from the columns are horizontally shifted in small increments across a nine-story section of the tower, avoiding the need for a large load-transferring structure.

== History ==
=== 1907 structure ===
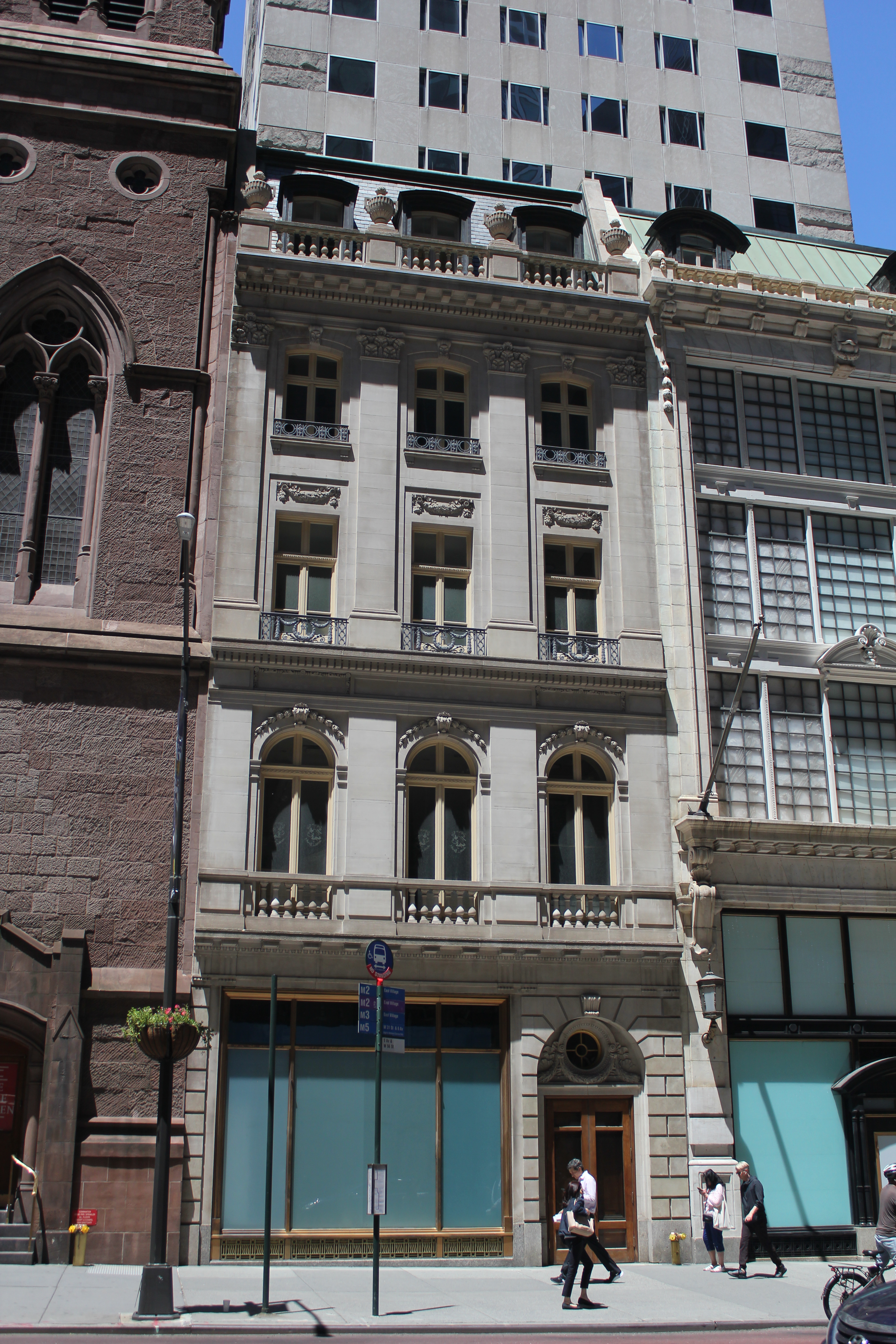
The previous building with the address 712 Fifth Avenue, completed in 1908

The Fifth Avenue Presbyterian Church leased its parsonage, a four-story dwelling at the address 712 Fifth Avenue, to interior decorators L. Alavoine & Company in May 1906. The following March, Albert S. Gottlieb filed plans for a five-story store and office building at that site, on a lot measuring 25 by 116 feet (7.6 by 35.4 m). The new structure, completed in 1908, was designed similarly to other residential buildings erected at the same time. At the time, the stretch of Fifth Avenue in Midtown was largely residential but was becoming more commercial. Christopher Gray wrote that the five-story structure was "elegantly designed, but still a business intrusion".

The new office at 712 Fifth Avenue was first occupied by L. Alavoine & Company, and the jeweler Cartier had offices on the third floor. The Cartier store opened in 1909 and operated until 1917, when it moved to the former Morton F. Plant House several blocks south. There were also numerous art galleries on the first floor. These included the galleries of Edward Brandus, which a Brooklyn Daily Eagle writer described as making visitors feel "in the presence of a distinguished and refined company". Another art dealer in the building, Arthur Harlow & Co., moved elsewhere in 1927. Glassware and silver importer A. Schmidt & Sons leased the ground-floor storefront, as well as part of the basement, in 1934 for fifteen years. L. Alavoine continued to hold exhibitions at the building during this time. Men's furnishings store Budd Ltd. leased the storefront in 1948. The building continued to house art galleries through the 1950s, including the Louis Carr Gallery, Associated American Artists Galleries, and Albert Landry Gallery. 712 Fifth Avenue was owned by the Fifth Avenue Presbyterian Church until 1959, when jeweler Harry Winston bought it.

Rizzoli Bookstore, a division of Rizzoli Libri, purchased the building from Harry Winston in 1963. The sale included a covenant that compelled the owners to use the building "only in a first-class manner" and maintain the exterior to a standard set by the Fifth Avenue Association. Rizzoli also bought the property at 2 West 56th Street, creating an L-shaped assemblage. The space was renovated by Ferdinand Gottlieb to include one- and two-story-high spaces with wood paneling. The Rizzoli store opened within 712 Fifth Avenue in October 1964. The store attracted customers with its "marble floors, oak paneling, [and] sparkling chandeliers", as The Christian Science Monitor described its design. The Rizzoli store also had an art gallery where drawings and paintings were exhibited. In 1966, the store expanded into the section along 2 West 56th Street. Over the next two decades, the store gained popularity as an unofficial landmark. Rizzoli was one of several bookstores in the midtown section of Fifth Avenue during this time, along with Charles Scribner's Sons at 597 Fifth Avenue and Brentano's at 586 Fifth Avenue.

=== Skyscraper development ===
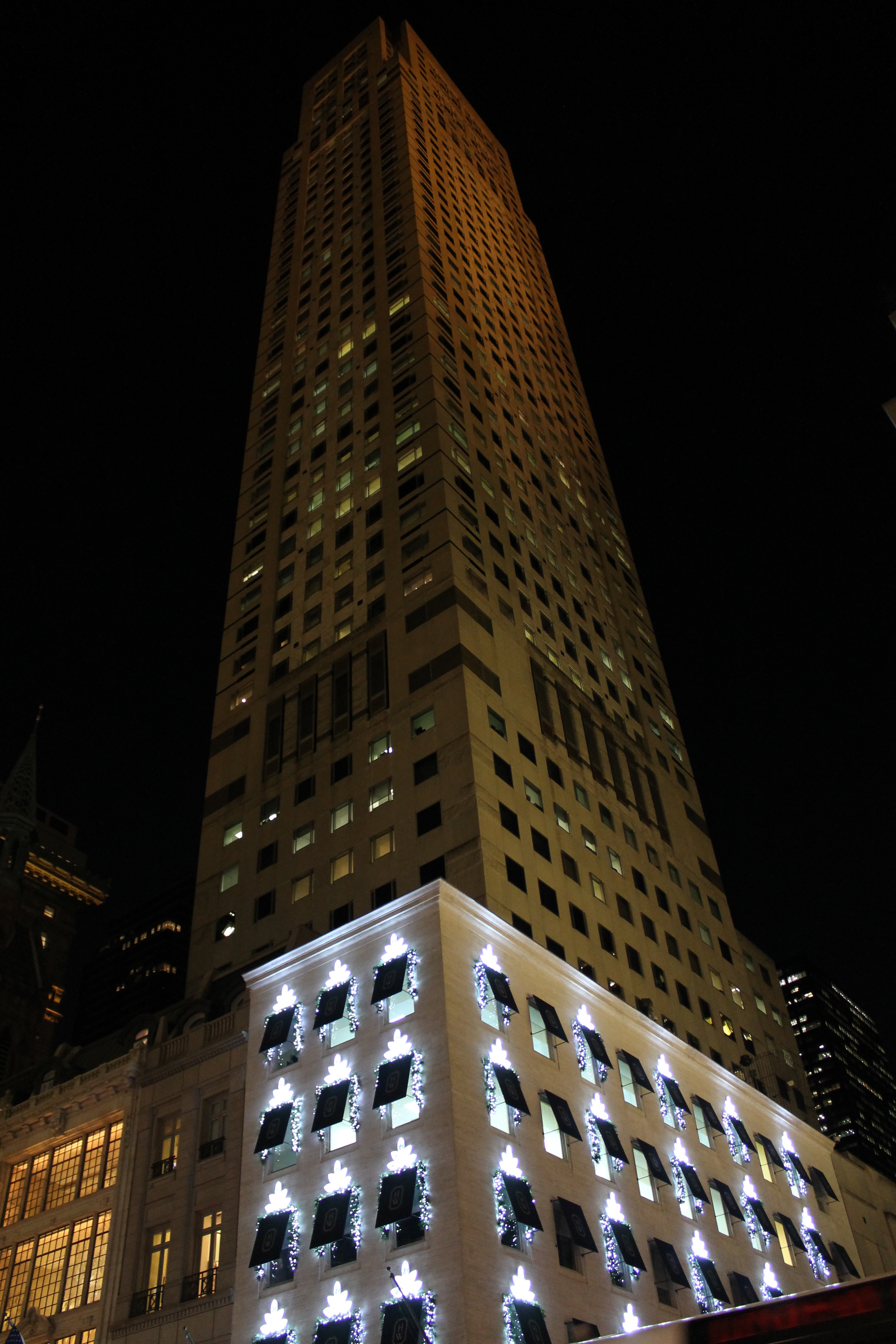
Seen at night

==== Early plans ====
In 1983, developer David S. Solomon began planning a 44-story office skyscraper at the southwest corner of 56th Street and Fifth Avenue. Since neither the Rizzoli Building nor the adjacent Coty Building at 714 Fifth Avenue were designated as official landmarks, he intended to replace them. The owners of Steadsol Fifth Associates, a consortium of which Solomon was part, bought both buildings in 1984 with the intent of demolishing them. The owners of the Rizzoli and Coty Buildings initially refused to sell their respective properties. At the time, the Rizzoli Building and the bookstore were controlled by the Carraro family, which lived in Milan. After Solomon made several trips to Milan, the Carraro family decided to sell the 712 Fifth Avenue house to Solomon. The doctor who owned the Coty Building also agreed to sell his structure in return for a stake in the new skyscraper.

Solomon also acquired the air rights over the Fifth Avenue Presbyterian Church as well as the three-story Custom Shop at 716 Fifth Avenue. Harry B. Macklowe had already owned the properties at 4 and 6 West 56th Street and ultimately agreed to sell these structures to Steadsol after the latter bought two additional properties at 2 and 8 West 56th Street. The assemblage cost Steadsol $86 million in total, or about $4,000 per square foot ($43,000/m^{2}). Several designs were proposed for the new tower, including those for an apartment, hotel, apartment hotel, and office building. The developers promised the new skyscraper would harmonize with the structures around it, with a facade clad largely in limestone.

The Coty Building's grimy windows caught the attention of architectural historian Andrew Dolkart, who found that the Coty Building's windows were the only documented architectural work by René Lalique in the United States. The discovery of the Coty Building's windows spurred a movement to oppose Steadsol's proposed tower. Real estate developer Donald Trump also opposed the development of the new skyscraper. Trump's opposition was related to the fact that the new skyscraper would compete with his Trump Tower was diagonally across Fifth Avenue and 56th Street. The Municipal Art Society petitioned the Landmarks Preservation Commission to designate the buildings, and both were designated on January 29, 1985, temporarily delaying the skyscraper's development. Due to a lack of communication between the New York City Department of Buildings and the Landmarks Preservation Commission, alteration permits for the Coty and Rizzoli Buildings were initially approved in spite of the designations. The Coty and Rizzoli Buildings were given 24-hour police protection because of fears they could be demolished. Steadsol Fifth Associates later had its alteration permits for the Coty Building revoked.

==== Revisions ====
In mid-1985, the commission approved a revised plan designed by Kohn Pedersen Fox, which called for a 650-foot (200 m) tower with several setbacks. The facades of the landmark Coty and Rizzoli Buildings would be preserved under this plan. Architectural historian Charles Lockwood criticized the proposal as an "unacceptable preservation solution", and Paul Goldberger described the plan as part of a trend in "facadism", in which the "essence" of the landmarks was still destroyed with the demolition of their interiors. In preparation for the skyscraper's construction, the Coty Building's windows were restored in 1986; the building at 716 Fifth Avenue, a two-story jewelry store, was demolished. The same year, luxury store Henri Bendel announced its intent to move its flagship store to the base of 712 Fifth Avenue. Steadsol Fifth Associates edited their plans again, this time designing 650-foot tower with flat facades because the setbacks would have made the upper floors too small. This drew consternation from Manhattan Community Board 5, which requested that another hearing be held.

The Landmarks Preservation Commission approved modified plans in March 1987. Construction began later that year, and a joint venture between Solomon and the Taubman Company took over the development. Architectural Record reported that the building would rise 53 stories and be completed by December 1989. As part of the project, Bendel hired Beyer Blinder Belle to restore the landmark facades and build a five-story neoclassical-style facade at 716 Fifth Avenue. The interiors of the landmark structures were completely demolished and the facades were braced back 50 feet into the new tower. The commission needed to approve any interior or exterior work within 50 feet of a landmark designation, but the tower was exactly 50 feet away from the landmark facades, so such approval was not needed. The building was topped out by 1989.

=== Office use ===
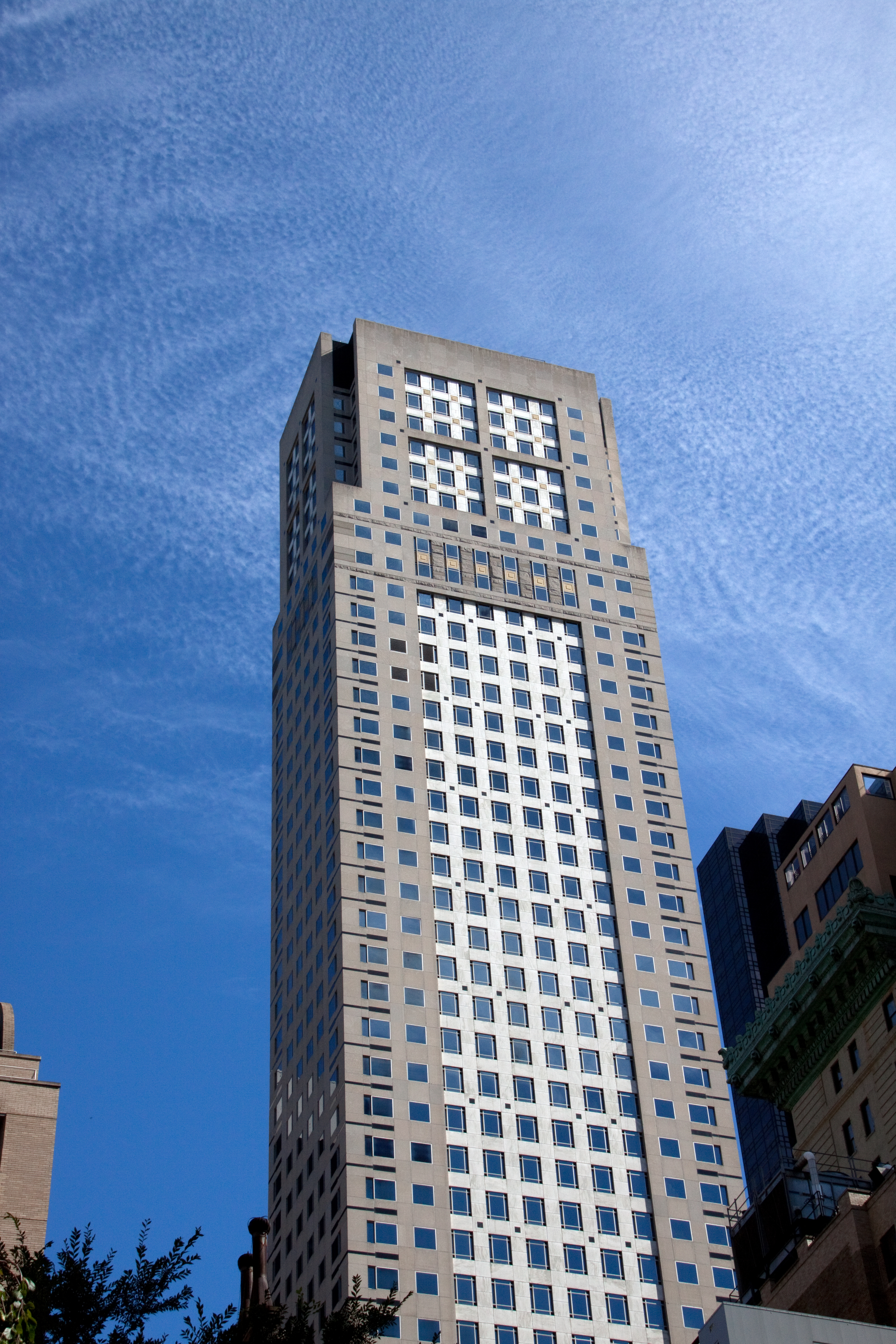
Viewed from the south

712 Fifth Avenue's completion in 1990 coincided with the beginning of the early 1990s recession, when 14.5 percent of Manhattan office space was vacant. At the time, 423,000 square feet (39,300 m^{2}) of 712 Fifth's 457,300 square feet (42,480 m^{2}) was vacant, and the skyscraper was seen as a white elephant project as a result. Solomon Equities also had difficulties finding tenants at 750 Seventh Avenue and 1585 Broadway, which had been completed around the same time. The Solomons withdrew from the development of 712 Fifth Avenue in 1990, and Taubman then took over the project. In February 1991, the Henri Bendel store opened; at the time, there were six office tenants, including the Taubman Company. Six months later, several small tenants had signed leases for a collective 200,000 square feet (19,000 m^{2}) of space. Several floors were subdivided into smaller offices, some with shared conference rooms. Because of the relatively small floor size, 712 Fifth Avenue's owners had to charge high rents to make profits.

In 1998, the building was sold to the Paramount Group for $285 million (or roughly $523 per square foot ($5,630/m^{2}), then a record rate for office space. Two years later, the Lalique windows in the former Coty Building had to be removed for restoration, as the steel frame had rusted and expanded, cracking some panes. The windows were restored by Arthur Femenella. The writer Jerold S. Kayden published the book Privately Owned Public Space: The New York City Experience around the same time, in which he described Henri Bendel as selling merchandise in the atrium. Though this was a violation of the 1988 agreement that prohibited retail uses in the atrium, the city government took no action for two years. The city considered it a lower-priority violation since Henri Bendel's actions did not result in "a total denial of access". By the early 21st century, the building's tenants included Aberdeen Asset Management, Christian Dior, CVC Capital Partners, Riverstone Holdings, Roberto Cavalli, TSG Consumer Partners, and Vector Group.

By 2007, space in the building was in high demand, and office space was rented at an average of $165 per square foot ($1,780/m^{2}) per year. At the time, the average annual rent for "premium" Midtown office space was $85.28 per square foot ($917.9/m^{2}) per year. The high rents were in part because 712 Fifth Avenue was near the Plaza Hotel; nearby buildings such as the Solow Building, the Carnegie Hall Tower, the General Motors Building, and 888 Seventh Avenue also had high asking rates. In 2017, Paramount refinanced the building, securing a $300 million loan. The Henri Bendel store closed at the end of 2018. The following year, fashion designer Alexander Wang held a party in the vacant space to celebrate a business partnership with Bulgari. Harry Winston, which occupied the adjacent store at 718 Fifth Avenue, leased the former Henri Bendel storefront in 2020 for $7.87 million. The lease covered 18,000 square feet (1,700 m^{2}) in 712 Fifth Avenue; Harry Winston demolished a wall between 712 and 718 Fifth Avenue to expand its store.

== Reception ==
The Real Estate Record and Guide wrote of the original building in December 1908 that "a certain residential character is retained as befitting the use of the building by a decorative artist, without in any way affecting its rental value". The AIA Guide to New York City described the skyscraper as rising from the base of the landmark structures, saying that "the two tails (Rizzoli and Coty) wag this architectural dog, internally related to the Fifth avenue charmers, but externally isolated by Harry Winston's heavy handed folly at the corner."

Christopher Gray, architecture critic at The New York Times, criticized the building when it was topped out, saying that "it already has come to overpower what was a nicely balanced grouping." Paul Goldberger of the same newspaper wrote that the building held "more promise for the revival of Fifth Avenue than anything that has happened to that troubled boulevard in the last decade", despite his initial skepticism of the project. Goldberger dubbed it the "Best Tower Over the Store" in a 1991 column summarizing new buildings in New York City. Brendan Gill of The New Yorker wrote that 712 Fifth Avenue was "notable both as contemporary architecture and as a work of historic preservation" and that it offered "an especially attractive argument in favor of facadism". The author Eric Nash wrote that the multifaceted exterior ""looks right at home with the gray limestone of Rockefeller Center in the background and the marble front of Bergdorf Goodman in the foreground".

== See also ==
- List of New York City Designated Landmarks in Manhattan from 14th to 59th Streets
- List of tallest buildings in New York City
