= Coty Building =

Historic building in Manhattan, New York

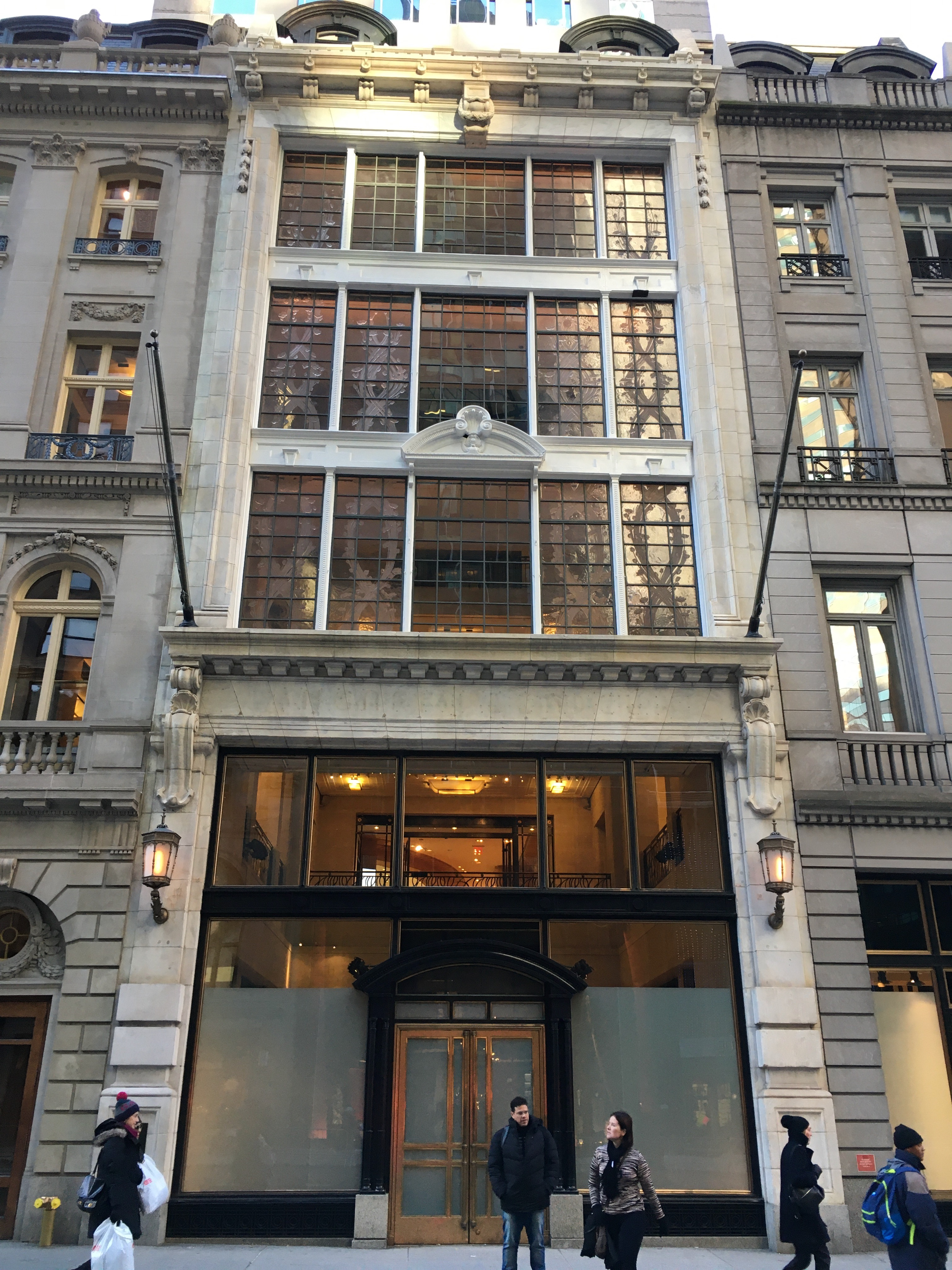
- (2019)

General information
- Location: Manhattan, 714 Fifth Avenue, New York City
- Coordinates: 40°45′44″N 73°58′29″W
- Named for: François Coty
- Groundbreaking: 1871
- Renovated: 1907; 1990

Technical details
- Floor count: 6

Design and construction
- Architect: Woodruff Leeming
- Known for: René Lalique Windows

Renovating team
- Architect: Beyer Blinder Belle

New York City Landmark
- Designated: January 29, 1985
- Reference no.: 1534

The Coty Building is a building at 714 Fifth Avenue in the Midtown Manhattan neighborhood of New York City. The six-story building contains a French-inspired facade and mansard roof, which are integrated into the base of the adjoining skyscraper at 712 Fifth Avenue. The third through fifth floors contain 276 decorative glass panes, the only documented architectural work by René Lalique in the United States.

Built as a brownstone rowhouse in 1871, it was redesigned in 1907–1908 by architect Woodruff Leeming. It was commissioned by owner and real estate investor Charles A. Gould, who, foreseeing the neighborhood shift from residential to commercial use, wished to replace the facade of the brownstone. Upon its completion in 1910, the building was leased to perfumer François Coty, who occupied the building until 1941. During the mid-20th century, the building had a variety of tenants. With the development of 712 Fifth Avenue, the Coty Building was proposed for demolition in the early 1980s. The Coty Building's facade was preserved in 1985 as a New York City designated landmark. The Coty Building's original interiors were completely removed, and the skyscraper was completed behind the older facade in 1990.

== Architecture ==
The design of the Coty Building's six-story facade dates to a 1907–1908 renovation from Woodruff Leeming. The facade is a glass wall surrounded by a frame. The first two stories have limestone-faced piers and a cornice supported by corbel brackets; they are treated as a single continuous section of the facade. The third through fifth stories are also treated as a single wall of glass, surrounded by a limestone frame with architrave motif at the top and bellflower pendants motifs on each side. Cast-steel spandrels are above the third and fourth stories.

There are five vertical bays of windows, separated by thin vertical steel mullions. The general articulation remains unchanged from its original construction, although the original casement windows were removed and replaced with windows by René Lalique. These windows comprise the only documented Lalique architectural work in the United States. Each bay consists of a multi-paned casement separated by a transom. The central bays contain clear glass, though decorative glass is located in the side bays. There is an arched, scallop-shaped pediment with small brackets above the third floor. Each pane is about 0.5 inches (13 mm) thick, surrounded by metal frames; the exterior of each frame is raised. There are 276 panes in total, each measuring 14 by 14 inches (360 mm × 360 mm).

The third- through fifth-story facade contains intertwining vine and flower designs, which according to the New York City Landmarks Preservation Commission are tulips. The top floor is set off by a modillioned cornice with console brackets supporting a balustrade. The sloping metal-covered roof with its arched dormers allowed the building to harmonize with its neighbors.

Originally, 714 Fifth Avenue contained a storefront on its ground story and offices on the other stories. During the development of the skyscraper at 712 Fifth Avenue in the late 1980s, all of the original interiors were removed. A four-story atrium was installed behind the facade of the Coty Building. A 79,000-square-foot (7,300 m^{2}) Henri Bendel store was built on the lower stories of the atrium. The store was designed with iron-railed balconies surrounding the atrium, and it was arranged so all stories of the building could have a direct view of the atrium.

== History ==
Fifth Avenue between 42nd Street and Central Park South (59th Street) was relatively undeveloped through the late 19th century. 714 Fifth Avenue was built in 1871 as a brownstone rowhouse, one of several on the western side of Fifth Avenue between 55th and 56th streets. By the early 1900s, that section of Fifth Avenue was becoming a commercial area. The Coty Building, along with the Gorham, Tiffany, Charles Scribner's Sons, and Demarest buildings, is among the few surviving stores that were erected for smaller retailers on Fifth Avenue during the early 20th century.

=== Early and mid-20th century ===
By the first decade of the 20th century, owner and real estate investor Charles A. Gould, foreseeing the neighborhood shift from residential to commercial use, wished to replace the facade of the brownstone. Consequently, in 1907, architect Woodruff Leeming was hired to remodel the house. Donald M. Mitchell received the general contract to remodel the town house, A side extension was to be erected at the rear, one story was to be added over the main building, and the interior would be renovated with electric lighting, an electric passenger elevator, partitions, and plumbing fixtures. The Real Estate Record and Guide wrote in December 1908 that the remodeled building had "a maximum of light and air on each floor, the general composition being good and at the same time securing the effect of proper supports for the upper stories by means of the side piers carried all the way down to the sidewalk level".

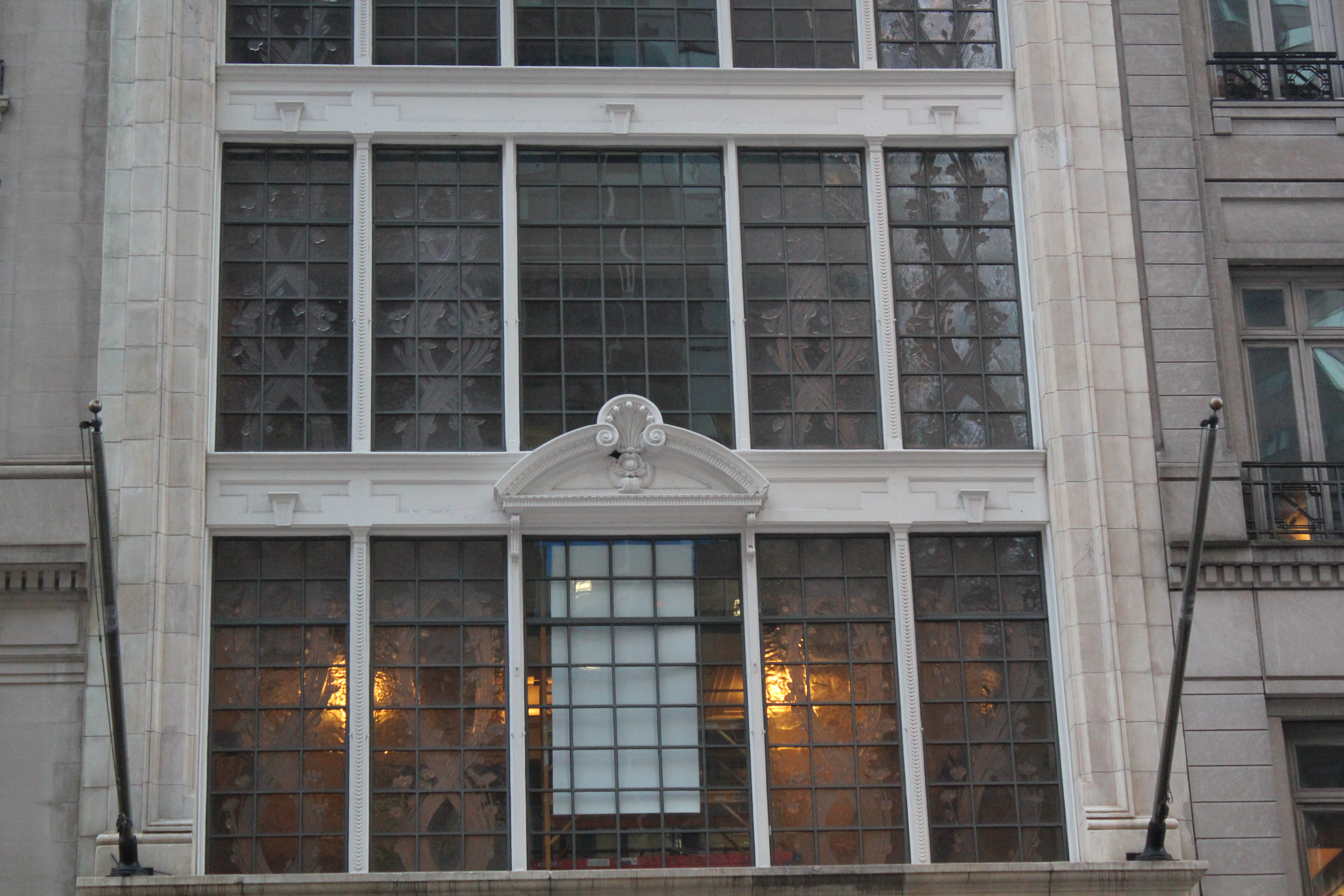
Second-story window detail

In 1910, the building was leased to perfumer François Coty, who used it as the U.S. headquarters of Coty. Coty commissioned jeweler and glass maker René Lalique to design a wall of glass windows. Lalique created an Art Nouveau-style composition of panes of glass decorated with flower vines, large enough to go from the third through fifth floors. The renovated building hosted exhibitions such as a 1910 exhibit to spread awareness of tuberculosis, as well as a 1914 benefit for the Committee of Mercy. Around 1921, Shoecraft Inc. leased some space in the building, where it remained for twenty years. In 1926, Coty moved the company's offices to 423 West 55th Street, retaining only the company showroom at 714 Fifth Avenue. The sixth floor was then leased to photographer Jay T. E. Winburn, while the fifth floor was leased to tailor Berkley R. Merwin Inc.

The building was owned by Gould until his death in 1926. His estate auctioned off its properties in January 1927, during which the building was purchased by Robert E. Dowling for $710,000. Coty's original lease extended until 1931 and was renewed until 1951. However, Coty Inc. remained at 714 Fifth Avenue only until 1941, when it moved the showroom to 423 West 55th Street. Also in 1941, Fareco Inc. bought the building from Dowling's City Investing Company for $675,000. The sale was made on behalf of the Coty interests. Women's apparel firm Kargere Inc. took the ground-floor storefront and the basement space in 1942.

Harry Winston then owned the building until 1964, when the Transportation Corporation of America acquired it. Hooks & Wax was hired to remodel the building for the Transportation Corporation's subsidiaries, which included Trans Caribbean Airways, DC Transit System, International Railways of Central America, and Spanish-language newspaper El Diario La Prensa. The Transportation Corporation was owned by O. Roy Chalk, who sold Trans Caribbean Airways to American Airlines in 1971 but continued to maintain his offices at 714 Fifth Avenue. Chalk sold the building in 1978 to Juschi Realty for $2.6 million. Chalk retained his third-floor offices while Juschi International opened a luxury women's sportswear and accessories shop on the basement and first, second, and fourth stories. By the early 1980s, a doctor living in Germany owned 714 Fifth Avenue, and an electronics store occupied the ground story.

=== Preservation ===
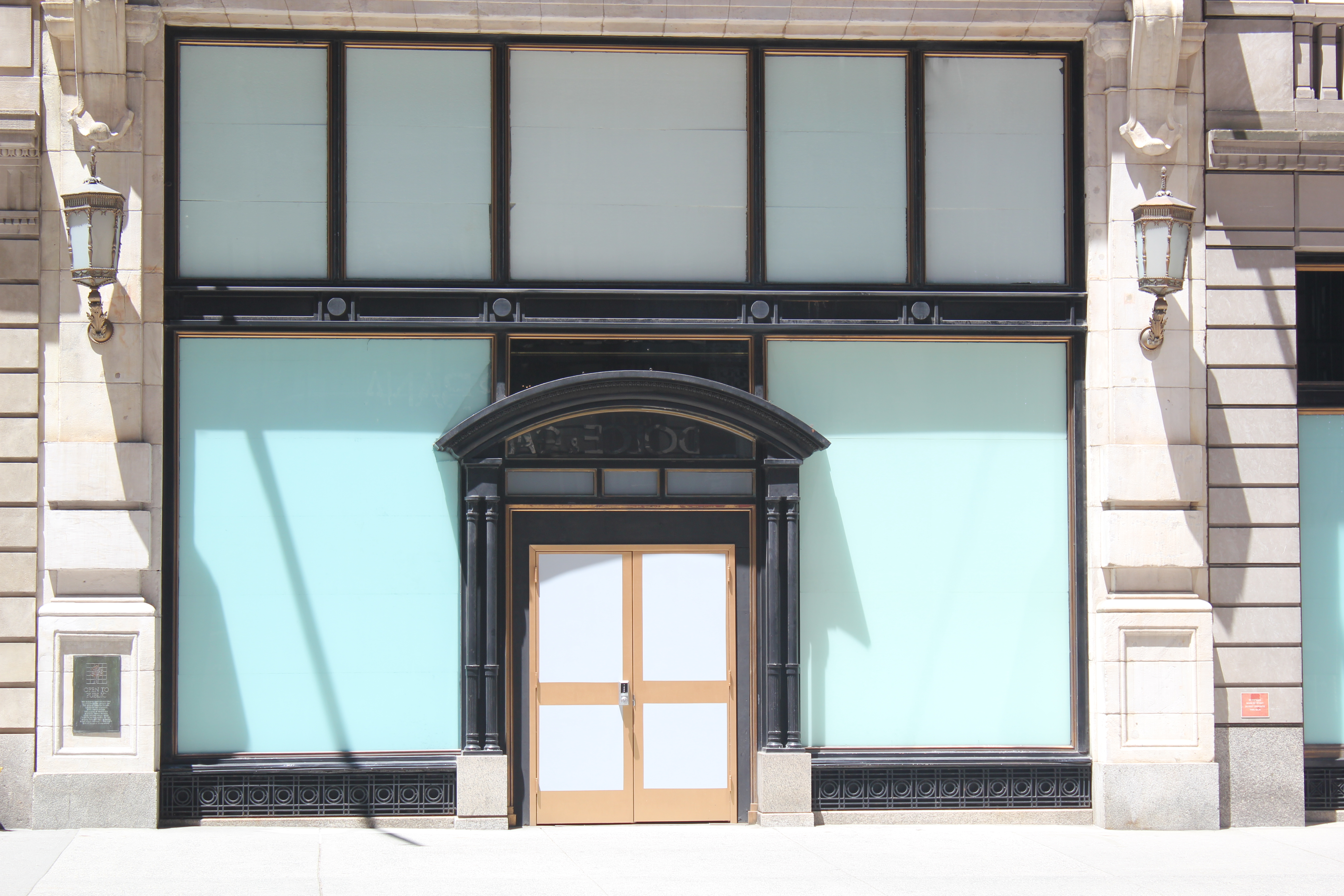
The storefront as seen in June 2021

In 1983, developer David S. Solomon began planning a 44-story office skyscraper at the southwest corner of 56th Street and Fifth Avenue. Since neither the Coty Building nor the adjacent Rizzoli Building at 712 Fifth Avenue were designated as official landmarks, he intended to replace them. The owners of Steadsol Fifth Associates, a consortium of which Solomon was part, bought both buildings in 1984 with the intent of demolishing them. 714 Fifth Avenue's owner agreed to sell his structure in return for a stake in the new skyscraper. The grimy windows caught the attention of architectural historian Andrew Dolkart, who found that the Coty Building's windows were the only documented architectural work by René Lalique in the United States. The Municipal Art Society advocated for the New York City Landmarks Preservation Commission to give the building official-landmark status, and both were designated in early 1985.

Due to a lack of communication between the New York City Department of Buildings and the Landmarks Preservation Commission, alteration permits for the Coty and Rizzoli Buildings were initially approved in spite of the designations. The Coty and Rizzoli Buildings were given 24-hour police protection because of fears they could be demolished. Steadsol Fifth Associates later had its alteration permits for the Coty Building revoked. The Landmarks Preservation Commission also approved a Certificate of Appropriateness that allowed the new skyscraper, 712 Fifth Avenue, to be erected behind the existing buildings. The skyscraper thus had to be built with the Coty Building at its base, incorporating the old facades in the design. Steadsol Fifth Associates, which was developing the skyscraper, had its alteration permits for the Coty Building revoked following the landmark designations.

Over the years, the building's Lalique windows had gradually become covered by grime. In 1986, the Greenland Studio in Manhattan removed all 276 panels from the facade for renovation. Of these, 46 panels were replaced with replicas made by Jon Smiley Glass Studios in Philadelphia. In 1990, Beyer Blinder Belle restored the facade for the opening of Henri Bendel's flagship store in New York City. Inside, the former Coty offices were removed and the atrium was added. Further restoration occurred in 2000, after water erosion had caused some of the steel frames to expand, cracking ten panes. One author wrote, "This type of hybrid preservation [...] with a balance between development and preservation is politically and economically essential in modern cities." The Henri Bendel store behind the Coty Building's facade closed at the end of 2018, and jeweler Harry Winston leased the space in 2020.

== See also ==
- List of New York City Designated Landmarks in Manhattan from 14th to 59th Streets
