= Rizzoli Bookstore =

Bookstore in New York City (founded 1964)

Coordinates: 40.7472°N 73.9930°W

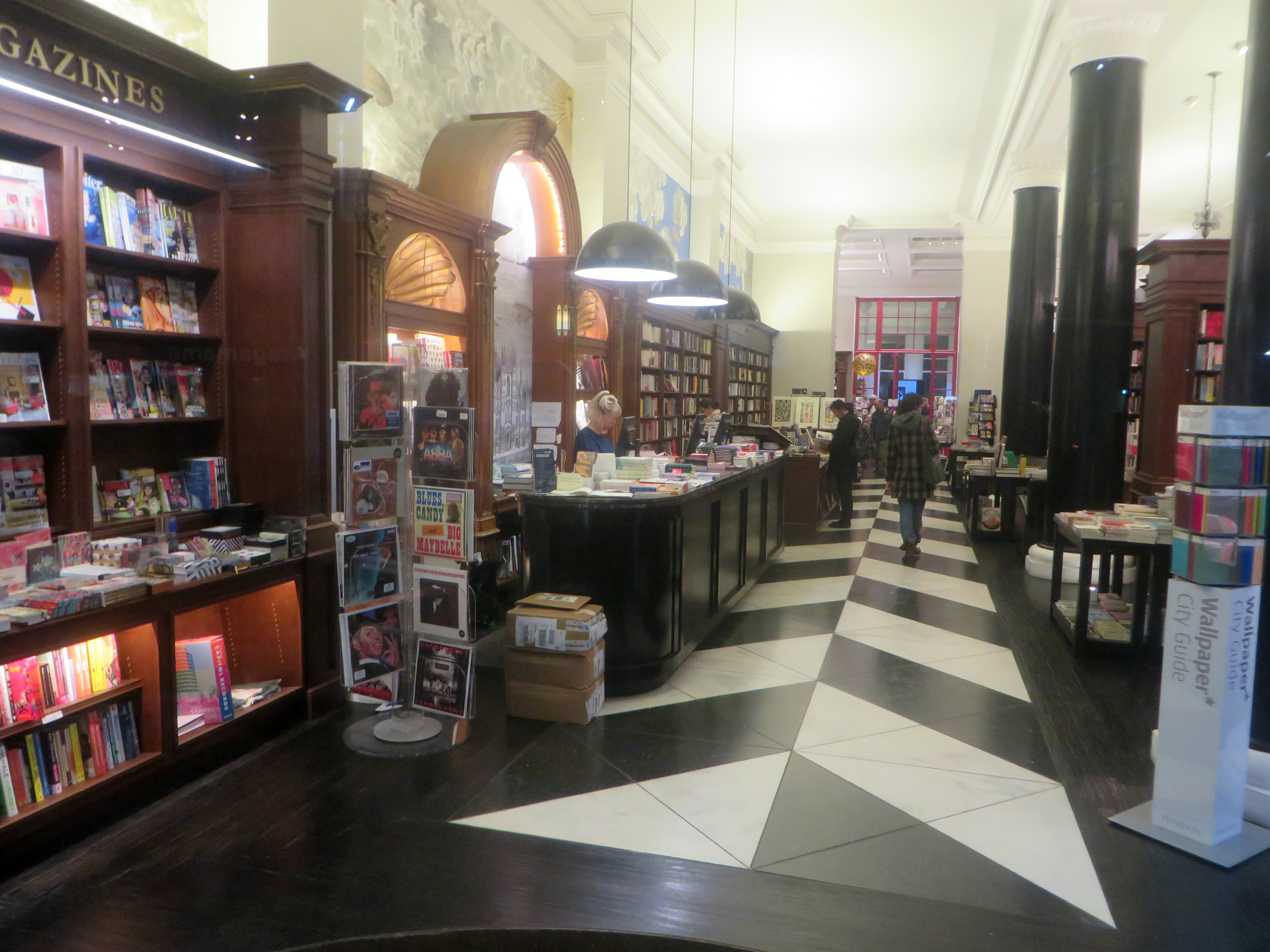
- Industry: Specialty retail
- Founded: 1964
- Founder: Angelo Rizzoli
- Headquarters: New York, New York, United States
- Products: new and rare books, magazines, stationery, DVDs, CDs
- Owner: Mondadori group (via Rizzoli International Publications)
- Number of employees: About 25
- Parent: Rizzoli International Publications
- Website: www.rizzolibookstore.com

Rizzoli Bookstore is a general interest bookstore, located in the St. James Building at 1133 Broadway in New York City, that primarily specializes in illustrated books and foreign language titles. The store is indirectly owned by Arnoldo Mondadori Editore, an Italian multimedia company that acquired the books division from RCS MediaGroup. The direct parent company of the bookstore is Rizzoli International Publications, also known as Rizzoli New York.

The Rizzoli Bookstore moved to its current NoMad location on July 27, 2015. It was located at 31 West 57th Street between 1985 and 2015, and at 712 Fifth Avenue from 1964 until 1985.

== History ==
In 1964, Angelo Rizzoli opened Rizzoli Bookstore at 712 Fifth Avenue in New York City; the building was designed by Albert S. Gottlieb in 1907 and inspired by the classical style of 19th century Parisian town houses. Angelo Rizzoli chose architect Ferdinand Gottlieb (no relation to Albert) to design the interiors. The Rizzoli store attracted legions of customers with its "marble floors, oak paneling, sparkling chandeliers." Gianfranco Monacelli, who went on to become the president and chief executive of Rizzoli Publications before creating Monacelli Press in 1994, started as a night clerk in the Fifth Avenue store in 1965.

In the 1960s, Roberto Polo, investment manager, art collector, and would-be design mogul worked part-time at Rizzoli while a graduate student at Columbia. As the director of the Rizzoli Gallery, he organized an exhibition entitled “Fashion as Fantasy.”

In 1976, Rizzoli opened a store in Chicago's Water Tower Place. Additional stores later opened in Boston, Massachusetts; Costa Mesa, Beverly Hills, Santa Monica, Pasadena, and San Francisco, California; Dallas, Texas; Oak Brook, Illinois; Atlanta, Georgia; Washington, D.C.; Minneapolis, Minnesota; Pittsburgh, Pennsylvania; and Philadelphia, Pennsylvania. In 1984, Rizzoli acquired Scribner's Bookstore on Fifth Avenue in Manhattan and opened an additional store in SoHo and a store in the Wintergarden in the World financial Center in Battery Park. The Scribner's flagship store on Fifth Avenue continued to operate under Rizzoli ownership until 1989, when it closed.

In 1985, Rizzoli Bookstore relocated to West 57th Street. The old Rizzoli building and the Coty Building next door were slated to be demolished for a new skyscraper at 712 Fifth Avenue, but were saved at the last minute when they were designated as official city landmarks. The new store occupied three floors of the former Sohmer Piano Company showroom and was renovated by H3 Hardy Collaboration Architecture.

Rizzoli closed most of its national locations except for its flagship store in 2001.

In 2010, Rizzoli Bookstore opened a boutique store in the Italian food megastore Eataly, featuring nearly 400 titles related to food and drink. In 2012, a similar store opened in Saks Fifth Avenue, featuring a curated selection of books on fashion, design, entertaining, interiors, special travel destinations and New York.

On April 11, 2014, Rizzoli closed its flagship store on West 57th Street in New York, under the protest of customers and preservationists, when its lease expired. The LeFrak Organization and Vornado Realty Trust, which had owned the building since 2006, planned to raze it and two adjoining buildings. Demolition started shortly after the bookstore closed. The New York City Landmarks Preservation Commission had refused to warrant landmark status for the building, noting that the interior design dated only to 1985 and that there was not enough original substance from the 1919 building left. The decision and the way the decision was made by the Landmarks Preservation Commission was criticized by the editorial board of the New York Times.

Rizzoli reopened at its current Broadway location in July 2015. The bookstore is now one of the key features of the NoMad Piazza, a pedestrian area cordoned off as part of the NYC Open Streets initiative.

In 2015, Arnoldo Mondadori Editore acquired the parent divisions RCS Libri and Rizzoli International Publications from RCS MediaGroup. In 2016, the RCS Libri was dismantled by the new owner, which Rizzoli International Publications and Rizzoli Bookstore were owned by Mondadori Electa S.p.A., another subsidiary of the group instead.

== In popular culture ==
Rizzoli Bookstore at 712 Fifth Avenue was used as a prominent location in the films Falling in Love (1984), Manhattan (1979), and True Story (2015), in addition to television series such as Seinfeld.
