= Belgian Shoes =

Shoe company

- Industry: Footwear, Fashion
- Founded: 1955; 71 years ago
- Founder: Henri Bendel
- Headquarters: New York City, Izegem
- Area served: Worldwide
- Products: Loafers
- Website: belgianshoes.com

Belgian Shoes are a variety of handstitched loafer, manufactured in Izegem, Belgium, a historic centre of the nation's shoe industry. The shoes are known for their small bow near the top of the vamp.

== History ==
The shoes were designed by Henri Bendel, the nephew of Henri Bendel, the founder of the eponymous New York boutique. When the Bendel family sold the family's department store in 1955, Bendel established the Belgian Shoes boutique at 60 East 56th Street, Manhattan, before moving to the current address at 110 East 55th Street in 2001.

== Clients ==
Belgian Shoes have been traditionally considered a status symbol among the Upper East Side and Hamptons social set, but have in the past several years become more widely worn. As early as the 1960s the shoe was considered notable as signifying a resistance to prevailing fashion trends, and there have been few significant changes to the range since then. Notable wearers of the shoe include Isaac Mizrahi and Bernie Madoff.

== Awards ==
For his efforts in reviving the Belgian shoe industry through the design and sale of the shoe, the Belgian government awarded Bendel the Knight of the Order of Leopold the First in 1964, and Knight Commander of the Order of Leopold the Second in 1970.
