= Yamaha Artist Services =

Yamaha Artist Services, Inc.

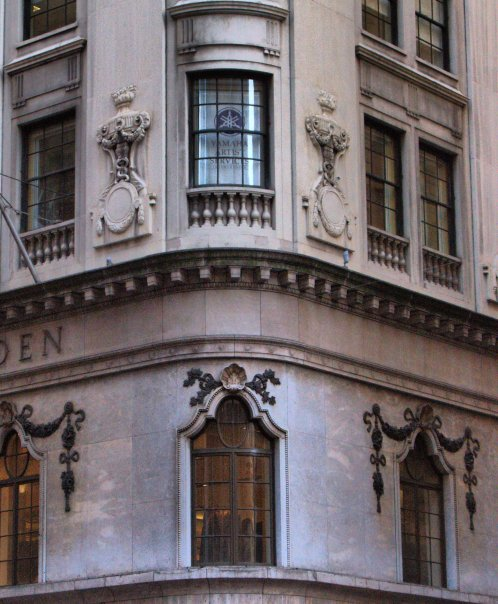
- Aeolian Building, current seat of YASI
- Abbreviation: YASI
- Formation: 1987; 39 years ago
- Founded at: New York City
- Legal status: Active
- Headquarters: Manhattan
- Region served: United States
- Services: Rooms to host concerts, rehearsal and recording sessions for musicians
- Owner: Yamaha Corporation
- Director: Bonnie Barrett
- Parent organization: Yamaha of America
- Website: yamaha.com/yasi

Yamaha Artist Services, Inc. (also known as YASI) is a provider of professional services exclusively for performing music artists, concert venues, performing arts organizations and educational institutions. Located at 689 Fifth Avenue in Manhattan, New York City, YASI is owned by the American subsidiary of Yamaha Corporation and features rehearsal, recording and performance spaces for musicians.

The YASI was brought into being in April 1987 as "Yamaha Concert & Artist Services", in the United States, having originated that same year in Paris, France, as "Centre Européen des Activités Artistiques" (C.E.A.A.). For a time, Yamaha managed the program within its new West 57th Street "Yamaha Communications Center", or "YCC" facility, located near Carnegie Hall. YCC closed in 1992. In May 2004, the current facility was opened.

== Overview ==
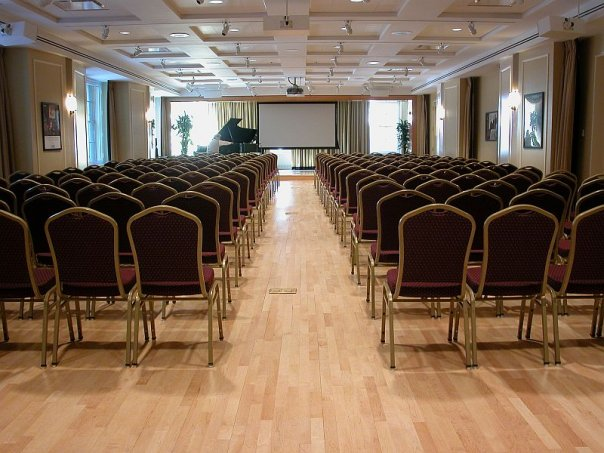
Yamaha Piano Salon pictured in 2005

Located in the Aeolian Building at 689 Fifth Avenue, the third floor piano salon, an acoustically isolated space originally occupied by a showroom of the Aeolian Piano Company, which made its reputation in organs, reproducing organs, pianos and most particularly piano roll mechanisms and rolls themselves from 1887 until 1985. Encompassing the entire third floor, the piano saloon features a performance venue seating up to 150 and houses a selection of concert grand pianos and "disklavier" performance reproducing pianos.

The program maintains relationships with classical piano performing artists and the performing arts world in general, by extension. Its current quarters occupy two entire floors of the Aeolian Building. This complex includes a hall known as the Yamaha Piano Salon and a brass and woodwind atelier, showroom, and custom shop.

The YASI promotes the professional use of Yamaha pianos by artists, producers, and recording engineers. It also manages a large pool of pianos, placed at dealers and at various venues around the United States. Opera companies and artist management companies have used the salon for opera training, Its facilities include an atelier, a showroom and a custom shop for instruments of the brass and woodwind family.

== See also ==
- Yamaha Artist
- Yamaha Entertainment Group
