= Charles A. Gould =

American industrialist

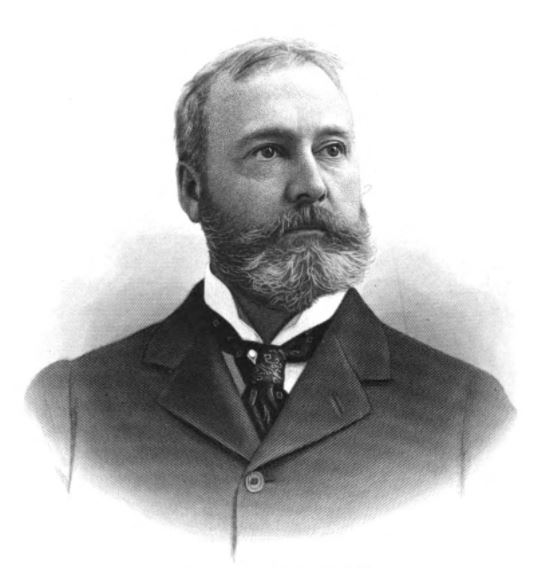
- Gould as published in The Heroes of the American Revolution and Their Descendants (1897)
- Born: Charles Albert Gould; January 13, 1849; Batavia, New York
- Died: January 26, 1926 (aged 77); Manhattan, New York
- Spouse: Julia Adelaide Stocking (m. 1869)
- Children: 4

Charles Albert Gould (January 13, 1849 – January 6, 1926) was an American yachtsman, industrialist and art collector.

== Early life ==
Gould was born on January 13, 1849, in Batavia, New York. He was the eldest child of William Wallace Gould (1826–1892), originally of East Pembroke, New York (and son of Jedediah Gould), and Electa Moulton (née Pratt) Gould (1831–1909), a daughter of Alfred Pratt.

He was educated in the public schools of Batavia and "prepared himself for college. He was unable, however, to carry out his plans in this regard, as his father met with business reverses. Thrown thus upon his own resources, Mr. Gould naturally turned his thoughts towards Buffalo, the largest city in his vicinity, and thither he went in 1869, a young man of twenty, to earn his own livelihood."

== Career ==
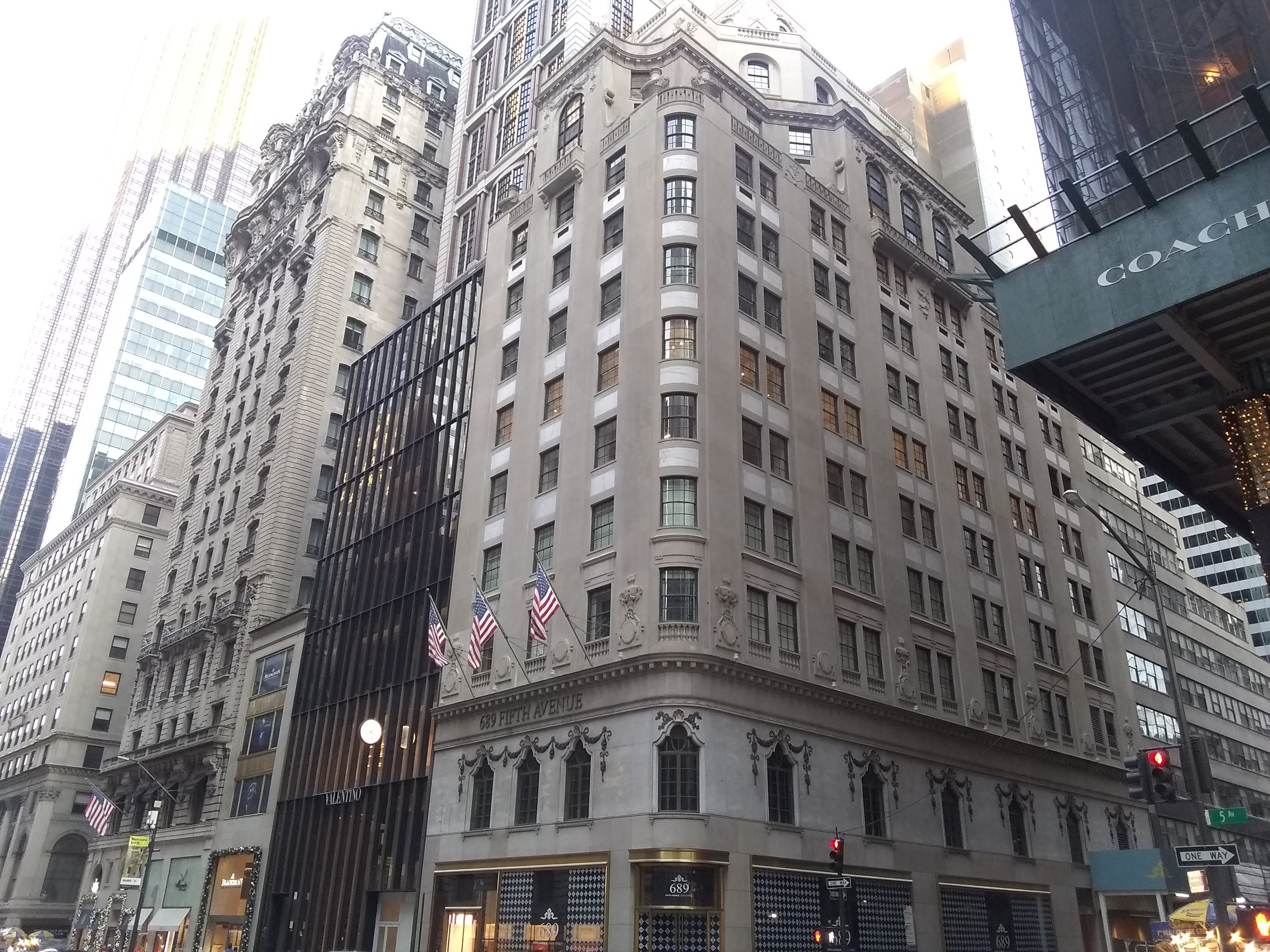
Gould's 689 Fifth Avenue

Gould began his career as an accountant in Buffalo in 1869. He later became Deputy Postmaster in Buffalo and Collector of Customs between 1881 and 1885. In 1891, he became president of the Gould Coupler Company in Depew, New York (of which he was also a founder), later founding the Gould Storage Battery Company in 1897, both of which had authorized capital of $5,000,000 each. The Gould Coupler Company provided railroad components to the New York Central Railroad. Until 1915, the Gould Coupler Company "was consistently prosperous, made large earnings, the greater part of which was reinvested in its business, and very few dividends were paid." He owned nearly all of the stock and "was in absolute control of the management and finances of both companies." In 1915 and 1916, due to "stringency in the money market" and a protracted strike at the Gould Coupler works, he needed significant funds to finance the Gould Coupler Company operations, so he agreed to sell Andrew Carnegie certain parcels of land at Fifth Avenue and 90th Street for $1,687,500 in December 1916, which was finalized in February 1917. In 1925, the foundry was purchased by the Symington Company, becoming Symington-Gould.

Gould also formed the Gould Securities Company (a holding company for his investments formed in 1925) and the Gould Realty Company (which held his numerous land holdings in New York City). He owned several prominent buildings including 689 Fifth Avenue (also known as the Aeolian Building), which was commissioned by Gould, who died before the building's completion, and designed by Warren and Wetmore. Gould bought the property, which was the site of the William Rockefeller house at Fifth Avenue and 54th Street, in 1925. His daughter Celia bought the structure at an auction in 1927 and kept it until 1944.

== Personal life ==
On September 1, 1869, Gould was married to Julia Adelaide Stocking, a daughter of Abraham Stocking. Together, they had a residence in New York City at 714 Fifth Avenue, and were the parents of four children, three sons and one daughter:

- Henry Colton Gould (1869–1892), who married Lilian Augustus Hollister Rockwell (1869–1940), a daughter of Augustus Rockwell, in August 1890.
- Charles Moulton Gould (1873–1914), who married Lillie Bell (d. 1946), daughter of Richard M. Bell, in 1896; he became vice-president and treasurer of the Gould Coupler Company.
- William Stocking Gould (1875–1955), who married Ethel Blanch Sanders, a daughter of Charles Walton Sanders, in 1898.
- Celia Adeladie Gould (1877–1948), who married George C. Milne, a son of William Milne, in 1899.

He was a member of the Union League Club, the Republican Club, the Engineers' Club, the Lawyers Club, the Athletic Club, the Lotos Club, the Reform Club. He was also a member of the Larchmont Yacht Club and the American Yacht Club in Rye, New York (of which he served as Commodore), which had been founded in 1883 to be more exclusive than the New York Yacht Club. One of the principal founder members was the tycoon, Jay Gould. He was also a prominent art collector and owned works by James Reid Lambdin.

Gould died at his home, 77 Park Avenue, on January 6, 1926. Gould left a gross estate of $14,528,555 and net estate of $12,768,505. Twelve buildings from his estate were sold for a total of $6,714,000. His widow died on August 16, 1929. After her death, there was a battle over his widow's will between his children.

=== Residences ===
Gould acquired Greyrock, a roughly 53-acre estate in Port Chester, New York, where they lived together for many years. At some point prior to 1916, they were separated and lived apart and Adelaide continued to live at Greyrock, including after his death, until her death in 1929.

Around 1908, Gould hired architect John Russell Pope to design a hunting and sporting residence, later known as Chateau Ivor or Ivor Manor, for him on his 1,000 acre estate in Dix Hills, New York, on one of the highest points on Long Island. The home, which was constructed by Walters & Woodhill of Flushing, was designed in the style of Louis XVI. The landscaping of the estate was done by the Olmsted Brothers. Following his death, the estate went through a series of owners until it was demolished in 1954.

=== Descendants ===
Through his son Henry, he was a grandfather of Henrietta Colton Gould and Jane Adelaide Gould (d. 1979), who married Sedgwick Minot in Buffalo in 1916 (and divorced in Paris in 1926), and lived most of her life, since 1919, In France and devoted her energies to saving the remains of the estate of Cardinal Richelieu, in Rueil-Malmaison.

Through his son Charles, he was a grandfather of Lawrence B. Gould, Charles A. Gould II, Julia Gould Wilder and Catherine Gould Chism.
