= Ferdinand Gottlieb =

American architect

- Born: October 5, 1919; Berlin, Weimar Republic
- Died: October 25, 2007 (aged 88); Dobbs Ferry, New York, U.S.
- Education: Columbia Graduate School of Architecture, Planning and Preservation
- Occupation: Architect

Ferdinand Gottlieb (October 5, 1919 in Berlin, Germany – October 27, 2007, in Dobbs Ferry, New York) was a New York-based architect. He headed his own firm, Ferdinand Gottlieb & Associates, based in Dobbs Ferry (1961–2007).

He is perhaps best known for his interior design of the original Rizzoli Bookstore at 712 Fifth Avenue in New York City (1964), and for his landmark Saul Victor House in the Fieldston section of New York City (1967), noted in the American Institute of Architects' AIA Guide to New York City as a "formal modernist design in now-grayed redwood siding". When the interior of the building housing the Rizzoli bookstore was razed for an office tower, architecture critic Carter Horsley decried not the loss of the block except that, "If anything was wonderful on the Fifth Avenue portion of the site it was the splendid Rizzoli bookstore in the building ... and the Rizzoli bookstore was less than two decades old."

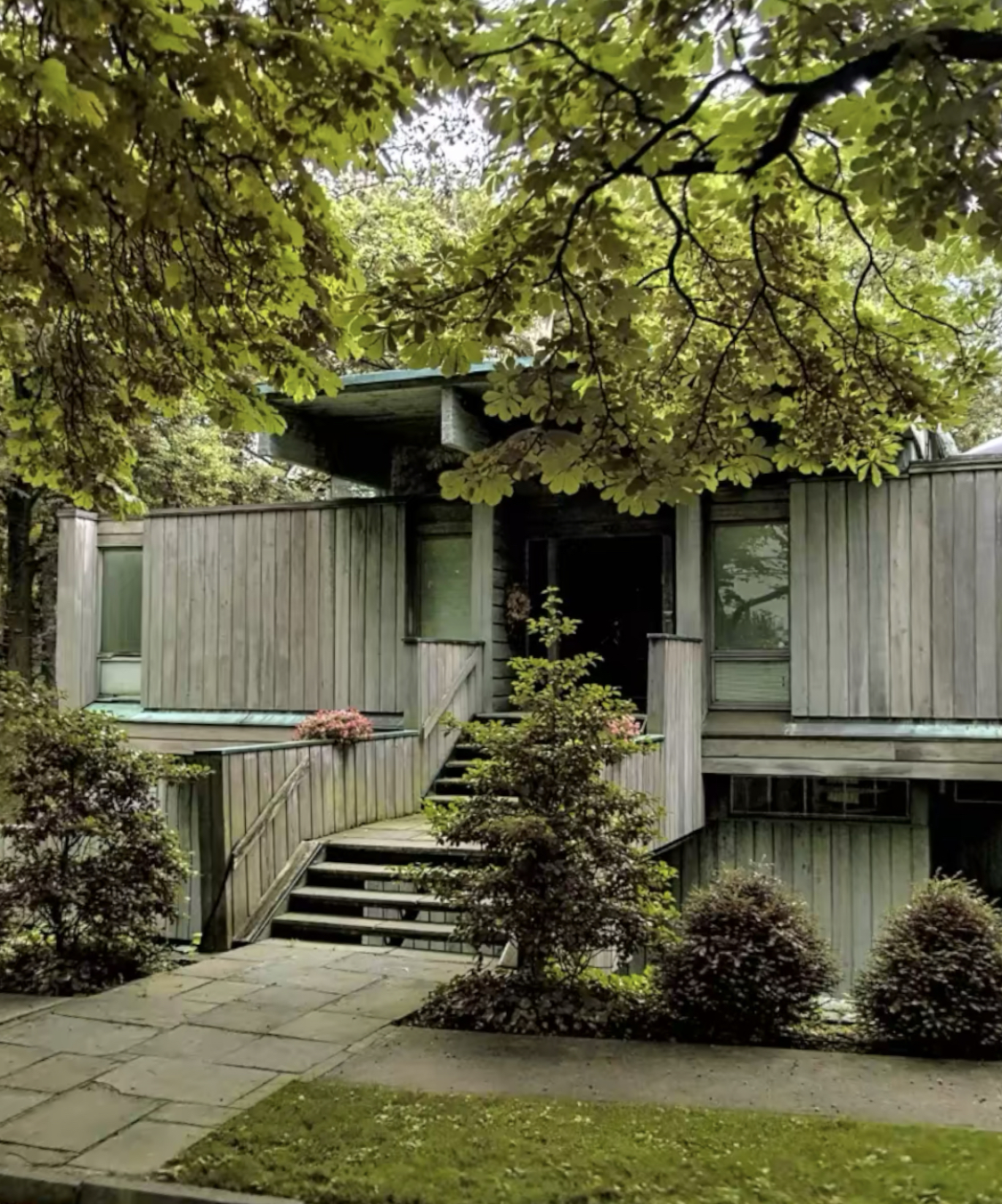
Saul Victor Residence by architect Ferdinand Gottlieb (photo taken 2021)

In addition to a substantial number of private residences, Gottlieb also designed the New York, now Horace Mann School for Nursery Years (1965), the headquarters for the now defunct salvage and construction firm Merritt-Chapman & Scott in NY (1966) and several other large commercial projects in the New York area including a warehouse for Pirelli tires in Oakland, N.J. The New York Times quotes from him in 1989, decrying most builders' and designers' alienation from the "grammar" of good design, even when building million dollar mansions: "Unfortunately, a lot of these mansions are done by people who haven't studied traditional architecture very carefully. They use mass-produced windows, incorrect brick and plastic moldings ordered out of a catalogue from South Carolina. It isn't a true piece of traditional architecture, but it gives the impression of wealth." The architect's personal residence, with its three barrel vaulted volumes, crafted by a Norwegian shipwright can be viewed here.

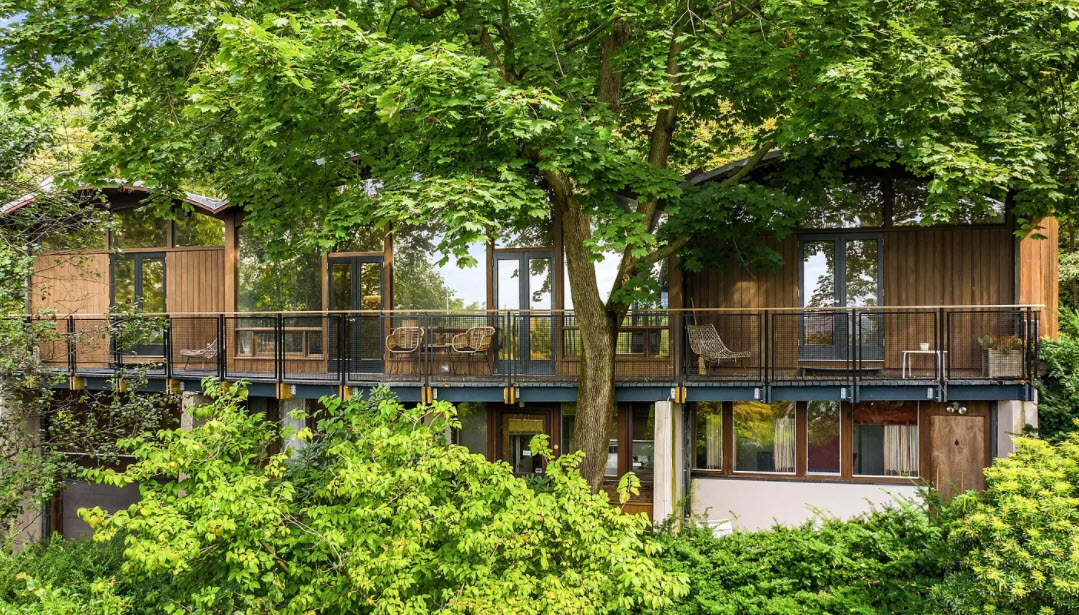

After escaping from Nazi Germany in 1934, he lived in British Mandate of Palestine before emigrating to New York in 1937. He subsequently served in the United States Army Air Forces intelligence in World War II, receiving two Bronze Star medals. After the war, he attended Columbia University School of Architecture, graduating 1953, and marrying Bernice Gottlieb (née Friedman) the same year, with whom he raised three children.

During the late 1940s and early 1950s, he worked as a draftsman at Klein and Shtier, Architects and Erwin Gerber, Architect, both located in Newark, N.J. and at William T. Meyer, Architect and Starrett & Van Vleck, Architects, located in Manhattan. Before opening his own practice, he was associated with Morris Ketchum Jr., a leading New York architect who was a pioneer in shopping center design. While working for Ketchum, Ferdinand Gottlieb served as both project manager and a designer for the Cross County Shopping Center, the first modern shopping center, working with the urban planning pioneer, Lathrop Douglass.

An early leader in the advancement of graduate real estate education in the United States, Gottlieb taught classes as an adjunct professor at the first such graduate program, the New York University Real Estate Institute, now known as the NYU Schack Institute of Real Estate, starting in 1967. Several internet sources credit him with working at Skidmore Owings & Merrill but this is as yet unconfirmed.

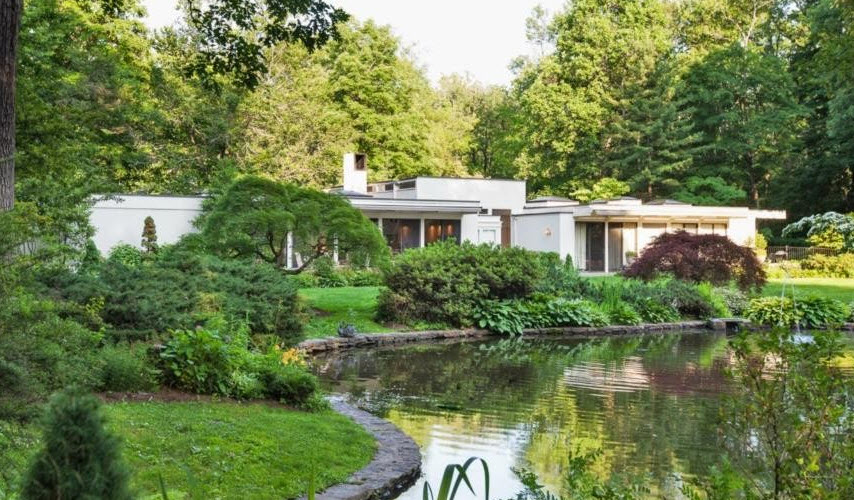
Ferdinand Gottlieb's design of residence at 123 Marlborough, Briarcliff Manor

Gottlieb's wife, Bernice Gottlieb, was an early leader in the international adoption movement.
