= Henri Bendel =

Defunct American luxury department store

Henri Bendel, Inc.
- Type: Subsidiary
- Industry: Retail
- Founded: 1895; 131 years ago
- Founder: Henri Willis Bendel
- Defunct: January 28, 2019
- Fate: Dissolved
- Headquarters: 712 Fifth Avenue; New York City, United States
- Number of locations: 29 stores (Jan 2015)
- Area served: United States
- Products: Women's clothing
- Parent: L Brands
- Website: Archived official website at the Wayback Machine (archive index)

Henri Bendel, Inc. (pronounced BEN-del), established in 1895, was a women's department store based in New York City which in its later history sold women's handbags, jewelry, luxury fashion accessories, home fragrances, chocolate and gifts. Its New York City store was located at 10 West 57th street. In 1985, when purchased by the Columbus, Ohio–based company Limited (Les Wexner), the new owner moved the store to 712 Fifth Avenue.

Henri Bendel was the first retailer to have its own fragrance, to offer in-store makeovers, and to stage its own fashion show. The retailer is credited with developing the concession, or shop-within-a-shop merchandising concept that is in use in some department stores today.

Composer Cole Porter namedrops the brand in the couplet "You're a Bendel Bonnet / a Shakespeare Sonnet" from the popular 1934 song "You're the Top", first made famous by Ethel Merman.

Former White House intern Monica Lewinsky created handbags, which were sold exclusively at Henri Bendel in New York City.

Owner L Brands announced plans in September 2018 to close all 23 stores, ending the brand; operations ceased in January 2019.

== History and influence ==
Henri Willis Bendel was born in Louisiana in 1868 and moved to New York to work as a milliner. He married Blanche Lehman, a member of the Lehman family. He opened his first shop, in Greenwich Village, in 1895. In 1907, he began branding the brown-and-white striped boxes that are still identified with the company. In 1913, Henri Bendel was the first retailer to sell Coco Chanel designs in the U.S.

After Bendel's death in 1936, his nephew became the store's president and served until his retirement in 1954. Bendel's nephew, who later founded Belgian Shoes, died in 1997.

Geraldine Stutz was president of Henri Bendel from 1957 to 1986. Stutz had "a legendary eye for discovering the newest designers and using them first," including Perry Ellis, Jean Muir, Sonia Rykiel, Carlos Falchi, Mary McFadden, and Ralph Lauren. In 1958, Stutz turned the store's main sales floor into a "U-shaped 'Street of Shops,'" which some consider the forerunner of today's shop-within-a-shop merchandising displays.

During the 1960s, Andy Warhol was an in-house illustrator. Beginning in 1994, Izak Zenou's illustrations have appeared on Henri Bendel ads and promotional materials.

In 1977, Stutz recruited Patricia Peterson, fashion editor of The New York Times, to be vice president in charge of Advertising, Fashion and Promotion, a position Peterson maintained until her retirement in 1989. During her 12-year tenure, Peterson invited guest artists, such as Edward Gorey and Candy Pratts, to create Bendel's famous window displays. She and her husband, fashion photographer Gösta Peterson, created a weekly ad campaign for Bendel's that ran as a half-page in The New York Times each Sunday.

In recent years, the retailer had aimed to grow from an "iconic New York brand" into "a nationally recognized accessories company." Beginning in 2008, the brand expanded beyond the New York store to become a national chain with 28 stores (in addition to the NYC flagship) across the U.S. In 2009, Henri Bendel stopped selling apparel. In 2014, the New York flagship store and website began selling only Henri Bendel-branded handbags, jewelry, fashion accessories and home fragrances, following the model set at its other stores.

Henri Bendel was named Retailer of the Year in 2010 at the Accessories Council Excellence Awards.

In September 2018, The Wall Street Journal and other media outlets reported that Henri Bendel had announced the closing of its 23 stores and ending of its brand after 123 years in business. Owner L Brands said the move was part of efforts to improve profitability and focus on brands like Victoria's Secret.

On January 19, 2019, all Henri Bendel stores were closed and its website was shuttered on January 28, 2019.

== Flagship store ==
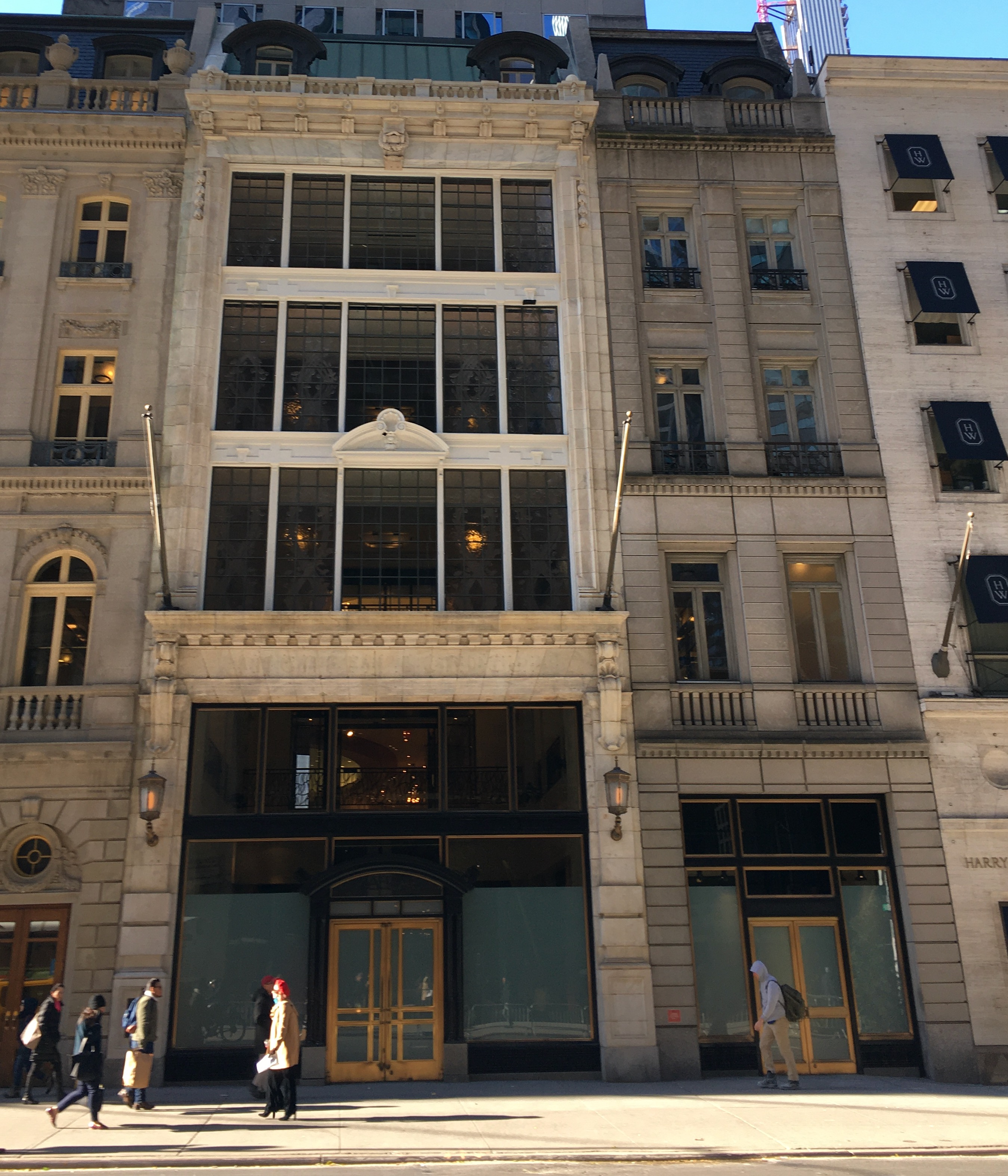
714 Fifth Avenue, Manhattan

From 1985 until its closing in 2018, the flagship store on Fifth Avenue was located in two adjacent buildings, the Rizzoli Building and Coty Building, as well as a new five-story building. During renovation of the Coty building, 276 "masterwork" panes of glass commissioned from René Lalique in 1912 were restored. The glass filled three large windows that comprised the front of the second, third, and fourth floors of the Henri Bendel store. The building had received landmark status from the city's Landmark Preservation Commission in 1985.

Of the building, The New York Times' architecture critic Paul Goldberger wrote: "For this mix of new architecture and old, skillfully integrated, holds more promise for the revival of Fifth Avenue than anything that has happened to that troubled boulevard in the last decade."

For more than 100 years, Henri Bendel's flagship and only store was located at 10 West 57th Street, accompanied by its famous display windows, brown canopy and brown/white shopping bags. The window artist, Robert Rufino, changed the theatrically designed scenes every Wednesday evening, every week. The doorman of the 1970s until his passing in 1982, "Buster" personally greeted each guest with a smile, typically accompanied by the guest's name, which he managed to memorize. He was so appreciated by the customers that Henri Bendel's sold a stuffed doll in the liking of Buster, which always sold out. Until 1985, the 10 West 57th Street store retained its manually operated elevators.

== Ownership ==
After Bendel's nephew, also named Henri Bendel, retired from the company in 1954, the Bendel family sold the store to a group of investors. In 1980, Henri Bendel president Geraldine Stutz purchased the store with a group of investors from Genesco Inc., a retailing/apparel company that had owned Bonwit Teller and other stores.

In 1985, L Brands acquired the Henri Bendel brand. Formerly Limited Brands, the Columbus, Ohio–based company is also the parent of Victoria's Secret, PINK, Bath & Body Works, and La Senza, and operates 2,917 company-owned specialty stores in the US, Canada and the United Kingdom.
