= 689 Fifth Avenue =

Office building in Manhattan, New York

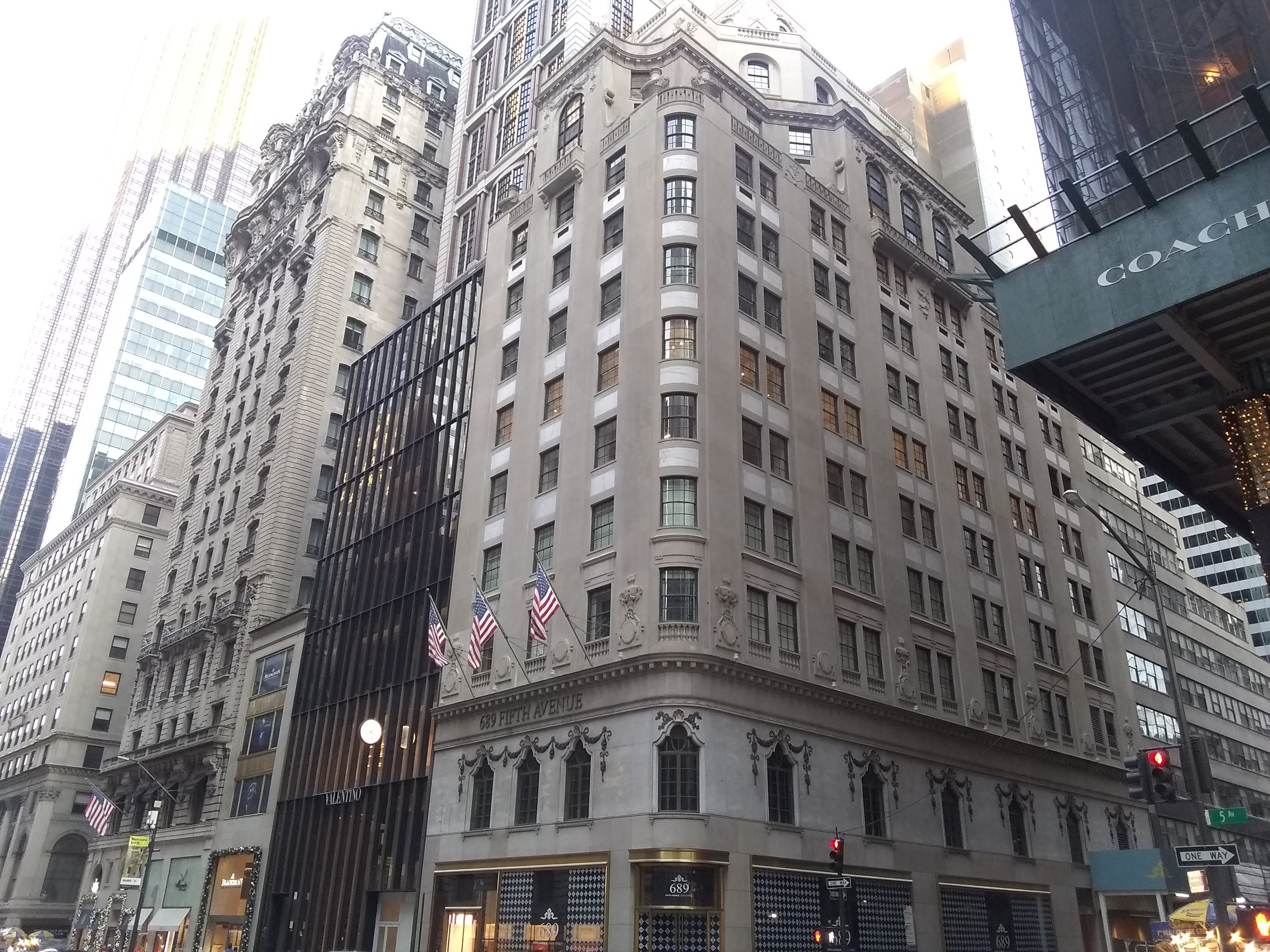
- Viewed from the corner of Fifth Avenue and 54th Street
- Interactive map of the 689 Fifth Avenue area
- Alternative names: Aeolian Building, Elizabeth Arden Building

General information
- Location: Manhattan, New York, U.S.
- Coordinates: 40°45′39.8″N 73°58′29.6″W
- Construction started: 1925
- Completed: 1927
- Opening: February 23, 1927

Height
- Roof: 224 ft (68 m)

Technical details
- Floor count: 15

Design and construction
- Architect: Warren and Wetmore
- Main contractor: James Baird Construction Company

New York City Landmark
- Designated: December 10, 2002
- Reference no.: 2125

689 Fifth Avenue (originally the Aeolian Building and later the Elizabeth Arden Building) is a commercial building in the Midtown Manhattan neighborhood of New York City, at the northeast corner of Fifth Avenue and 54th Street. The building was designed by Warren and Wetmore and constructed from 1925 to 1927.

The fifteen-story building was designed in the neoclassical style with French Renaissance Revival details. The primary portions of the facade are made of Indiana Limestone, interspersed with Italian marble spandrels, while the upper stories are made of decorative buff-colored terracotta. The first nine stories occupy nearly the whole lot, with a rounded corner facing Fifth Avenue and 54th Street. On the 10th, 12th, and 14th floors, the building has setbacks as mandated by the 1916 Zoning Resolution, and the building contains several angled sections. The decorative details include urns at the ninth-story setback, garlands, and a mechanical penthouse with a pyramidal roof and a lantern.

689 Fifth Avenue was commissioned by iron and steel magnate Charles A. Gould, who died before the building's completion. His daughter Celia Gould Milne bought the structure at an auction in 1927 and kept it until 1944. The building was the headquarters of the Aeolian Company, an instrument manufacturer, until 1938. Afterward, the storefront was renovated and the building's upper stories were used by a variety of office tenants. During the mid-20th century and late 20th century, the building was also named for Elizabeth Arden, Inc., which occupied the northern storefront and some office space for eight decades. The southern storefront has been used by numerous tenants including Gucci, Zara, and Massimo Dutti. The New York City Landmarks Preservation Commission designated 689 Fifth Avenue as an official landmark in 2002.

== Site ==
The Aeolian Building is at 689 Fifth Avenue in the Midtown Manhattan neighborhood of New York City. It is on the northeast corner of Fifth Avenue to the west and 54th Street to the south. The land lot is L-shaped and covers 6,925 ft^{2} (643.4 m^{2}), with a frontage of 50.42 ft (15.37 m) on Fifth Avenue and 125 ft (38 m) on 54th Street. Nearby sites include the residences at 5 and 7 West 54th Street and the University Club of New York to the west; The Peninsula New York hotel to the northwest; the St. Regis New York hotel to the north; 19 East 54th Street to the east; the William H. Moore House to the south; and Saint Thomas Church to the southwest.

Fifth Avenue between 42nd Street and Central Park South was relatively undeveloped through the late 19th century, when brownstone rowhouses were built on the avenue. The surrounding area was once part of the common lands of the city of New York. The lots along Fifth Avenue were laid out in the late 18th century following the American Revolutionary War. Upscale residences were constructed around Fifth Avenue following the American Civil War. By the early 1900s, that section of Fifth Avenue was becoming a commercial area. The Aeolian Building's site is also near West 57th Street, where an artistic hub developed around the two blocks from Sixth Avenue west to Broadway during the late 19th and early 20th centuries. The northeastern corner of 54th Street and Fifth Avenue had contained the house of William Rockefeller Jr. through the early 20th century. After Rockefeller died in 1922, his house was sold to the Mandel-Ehrich Corporation in 1923, along with other nearby buildings he had owned.

== Architecture ==
689 Fifth Avenue was designed in the neoclassical style by Warren and Wetmore and constructed by the James Baird Construction Company. It is 15 stories tall, or 14 stories excluding its penthouse. The roof of the building is 224 ft (68 m) above ground. The building has a curved corner facing the intersection of 54th Street and Fifth Avenue, and it has setbacks at its 10th, 12th, and 14th floors. The setbacks were included to comply with the 1916 Zoning Resolution. According to Whitney Warren of Warren and Wetmore, "our inspiration [for the design] lay everywhere, difficult to fix". Warren sought to soften the edges of the exterior with the curved corner, bronze ribbon sashes, and slightly pitched roof.

=== Facade ===
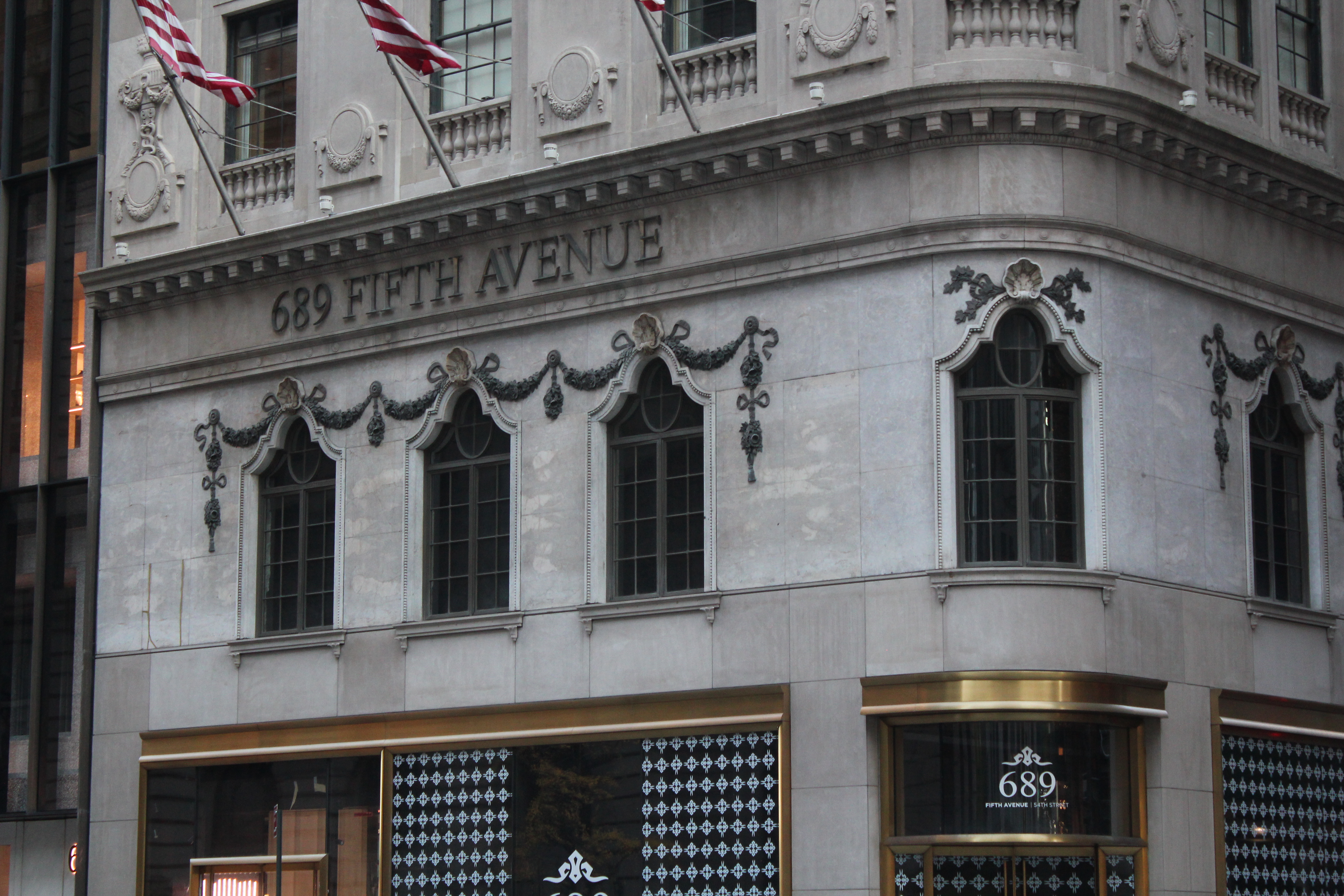
Detail of the first and second stories

The ground story originally contained a storefront made of black and white marble, which was designed by Mott B. Schmidt in 1929. The Arden storefront was at the northern portion of the west facade on Fifth Avenue. The original ground-story storefront had bronze-framed storefront windows, limestone pilasters, and a pink granite water table. The southern storefront was renovated in 1939 with yellow marble cladding in place of the limestone pilasters, as well as a large curved-glass window designed by Robert Carson. After the 1970s, the building was renovated with doorways on the northern portion of the Fifth Avenue facade, the corner of Fifth Avenue and 54th Street, the eastern portion of the 54th Street facade. The rest of the ground story had travertine pilasters and glass-and-metal storefronts. In the early 2010s, a replacement storefront with bronze-framed windows, limestone pilasters, and a granite water table was designed.

The second story initially had cusped windows with marble surrounds. In 1939, the second-story windows on the southern part of the Fifth Avenue facade, and on the whole 54th Street facade, were replaced with yellow marble. A limestone band, as well as a cornice with modillions, runs above the second story. Metal letters spelling elizabeth arden had been mounted on the Fifth Avenue side through the 2000s. As part of a renovation in the 2010s, these were redesigned with letters with the building's address. Above the second story, the pilasters are topped by plaques made of carved disks, and there are urns above half of these disks.

The midsection, consisting of the third through ninth stories, has an Indiana limestone facade, as well as spandrel panels of Italian marble between the windows on each story. On the third story, there are balusters across the bottoms of each window, as well as entablatures above each window. There are also flagpoles on the third story facing Fifth Avenue. On both facades, pilasters separate the vertical bays of windows from the third story to the setbacks above either the ninth or eleventh floors. On each of the third through ninth floors, there are louvers across the easternmost windows on 54th Street and plain windows in the other bays.

The upper section of the building is clad with buff-colored architectural terracotta, which was manufactured by the Federal Terra Cotta Company. Above the ninth story, the corners of the building are set back and contain a limestone balustrade with decorative details, as well as large urns atop the balustrade on each of the corners. These setback sections contain angled and curved walls. The center sections of either facade continue through the 11th story and have a decorative balcony in front of the ninth floor. The central section of the Fifth Avenue facade has one double-height round-arched window, and that on 54th Street has three such windows. Both of these central sections have garlands and keystones above the windows as well as scroll brackets on either side. A cornice with modillions, as well as a parapet, runs above the 11th story on all sides. The 12th and 13th stories are set back from all sides and have double-height round-arched windows, with a bay angled toward 54th Street. There is a balustrade above the 13th story. The 14th story is set back from all sides and has a parapet above it.

The roof of the building contains a short tower with a terracotta facade. The sides of the tower contain round-arched window openings with oculi, keystones, and garlands atop the windows. The corners of the tower are chamfered and contain shells above them. There is a pyramidal copper-clad roof and a copper lantern above the tower; the lantern was originally covered with gold leaf. East of the tower is a two-story mechanical penthouse.

=== Interior ===
According to the New York City Department of City Planning, the building has a gross floor area of 91,210 ft^{2} (8,474 m^{2}). According to Vornado Realty Trust, the building's owner as of 2021, the building has about 99,000 ft^{2} (9,200 m^{2}), with each floor containing between 2,500 and 8,000 ft^{2} (230 and 740 m^{2}). The ceiling heights are typically 12 ft (3.7 m) high and the floors can accommodate loads of 120 lb/ft^{2} (590 kg/m^{2}).

When the building had opened in 1927, it had five showroom floors, a second-floor rotunda with a fountain, and a 150-seat recital hall for the Aeolian Company. The main entrance on the first floor was positioned at the corner of Fifth Avenue and 54th Street. The space, leading to the main showroom, was a circular vestibule with a black marble floor and a coffered ceiling supported by pilasters. Elevators from the reception hall led to the second-floor rotunda and the showrooms on upper floors. The third and fourth floors contained piano showrooms, which were elaborately decorated, while the fifth floor was used as a radio, music roll, and phonograph room. The 14th floor contained organ salesrooms, large and small organ rooms, and a musical library. In addition, the basement had a shipping department, which was accessed from the ground story via a truck lift. After the Aeolian Company moved out during 1938, cosmetics company Elizabeth Arden, Inc. occupied the north storefront and shoe company I. Miller & Sons occupied the south storefront.

== History ==
=== Construction ===
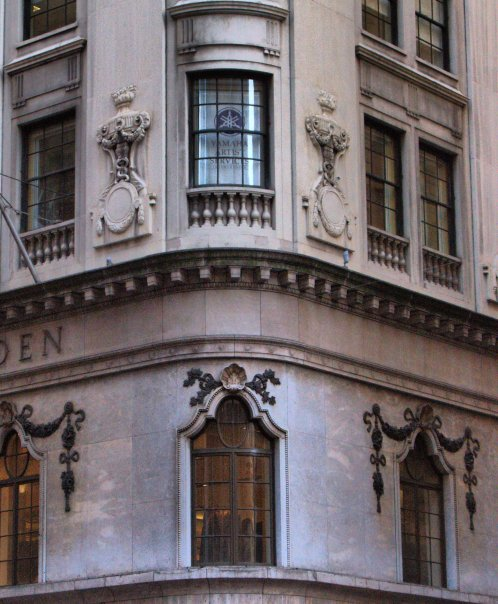
Corner detail

In February 1925, the site of the William Rockefeller house at Fifth Avenue and 54th Street was sold to Commodore Charles A. Gould, a developer who had made his fortune in the steel and iron industry. It was leased back by Henry Mandel, the previous owner, for $112,000 a year. Gould proposed to erect an office building on the site. In April 1925, the media reported that instrument manufacturer Aeolian Company had signed a 63-year lease for much of the space in the building. The company had previously been at Fifth Avenue and 34th Street until 1912, when it had relocated to the Aeolian Hall on 42nd Street. The company's vice president William H. Alfring said that Aeolian officials had felt "a sentimental urge to return to Fifth Avenue".

According to initial plans, the building was to be 12 stories tall, with a design in the "Francis I" style, and it was to contain a corner entrance and large show windows. The interior was to have instrument-display areas, recital hall, artists' room, music recording library, and offices for the Aeolian Company. The Rockefeller estate sold a $1.1 million mortgage loan for the building that June. Warren and Wetmore, who had designed both the previous Aeolian Hall on 42nd Street as well as the nearby Steinway Hall on 57th Street, were hired to design the structure. Warren and Wetmore officially submitted plans for the building in July 1925, with an expected cost of $1 million. At that point, the building's height was finalized at 14 stories. The James Baird Construction Company started erecting the structure that October.

Gould died in January 1926, shortly after construction commenced. While the building was under construction, the limestone facade was severely damaged in a fire in April 1926. The conflagration had been caused by an acetylene torch, which a worker had failed to turn off before leaving for the day. Several thousand people were rumored to have watched the fire, which scorched the facade up until the third floor. According to the New York Herald Tribune, hundreds of spectators gathered at the nearby University Club and Saint Thomas Church. Gould's estate scheduled an auction for twelve of his buildings, including the new Aeolian Building, in late 1926. The building was purchased for $3 million in January 1927. The buyer was Gould's daughter, Cecilia Gould Milne, who paid the then-record price of $432/ft^{2} ($4,650/m^{2}). Early the next month, the Franklin Savings Bank placed a first mortgage loan of $1.8 million on the building.

=== Aeolian use ===
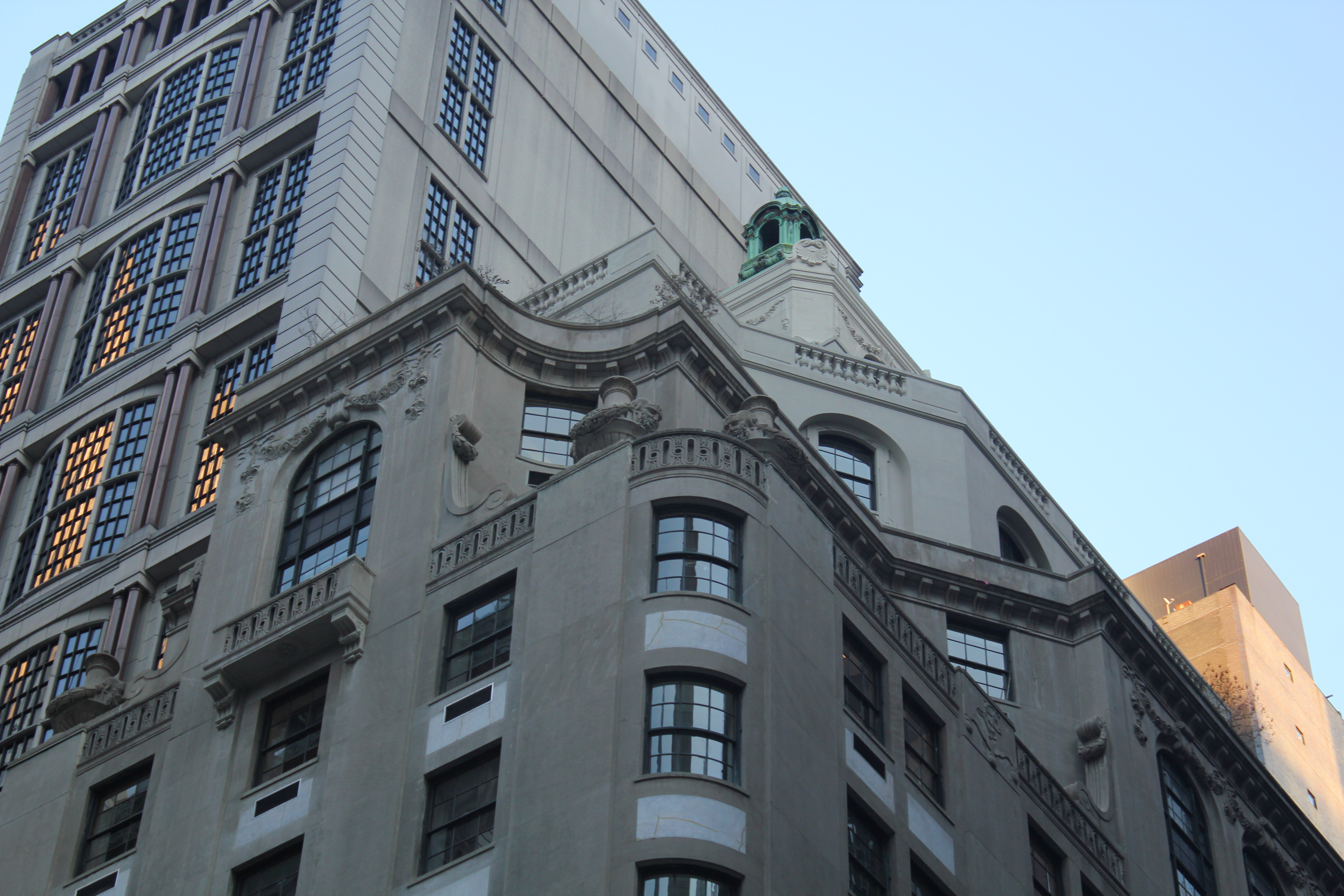
Detail of the top of the building

On February 23, 1927, the building was formally dedicated with the building's architect Whitney Warren, city government official Arthur J. W. Hilly, and Aeolian vice president E. L. Votey in attendance. The company's old building on 42nd Street closed in April 1927. In July 1929, Elizabeth Arden leased the 11th floor for 15 years on behalf of her company Elizabeth Arden Inc. The following month, Elizabeth Arden Inc. expanded the lease to the north storefront and five stories. The north storefront was redesigned by Mott B. Schmidt and retrofitted with a bright red door. The salon opened in January 1930 and was known as the Elizabeth Arden Red Door Salon. It contained glass walls with jade green surrounds, as well as rooms for salon treatments, exercise, and tap dancing on each of the upper floors. The salon interior was designed by Mrs. John Alden Carpenter and the ground-level shop was designed by Nicholas Remisoff.

In the 1920s, the new Aeolian Building hosted art exhibits such as a collection of works created by Albert, 4th duc de Broglie. During the 1930s, the building hosted events such as an exhibit of composers' manuscripts in the Aeolian offices, as well as musical benefit performances at the Elizabeth Arden offices. The Aeolian Company signed a lease for half the space at the Chickering Hall on 57th Street in early 1938. The new lease was signed because the existing lease at 689 Fifth Avenue was scheduled to expire that May. Accordingly, the Aeolian Company moved out that year.

=== Mid-20th century ===
In December 1938, I. Miller & Sons Inc. rented the southern storefront for $750,000; the storefront had then been recently vacated by the Aeolian Company. Robert Carson was hired to remodel the exterior, including the installation of a window at the ground-floor corner, while Louis Freedland was hired to redesign the interior. O'Brien & Fortin Inc. was hired as the general contractor. The I. Miller & Sons store opened in June 1939. Elizabeth Arden Inc. ultimately acquired outright ownership of the building in 1944, and it became known as the Elizabeth Arden Building. The I. Miller & Sons storefront was damaged in 1949 when a motorist, experiencing a heart attack, crashed into the store and subsequently died.

During the mid-20th century, 689 Fifth Avenue contained office space for a wide range of office tenants. Some of the occupants specialized in clothing, fashion, and design, while others were in media, marketing, advertising, and public relations. The office tenants included public relations firm Leslie E. Roberts and carpet firm Lack Trading Company which, in 1943, simultaneously signed leases for space in the building. Media tenants included the Transamerican Broadcasting and Television Corporation, which took three floors; Olmsted Sound Studios, which leased a sound recording studio; and Robert Saudek, which leased the penthouse in 1966. (Note: Transamerican Broadcasting and Television occupied 689 Fifth Avenue from 1939 to the 1950s; Olmsted Sound Studios, from 1954 to 1965; and Robert Saudek, from 1966 to the 1970s.) Organizations also took space in the building. These included the Institute of Pacific Relations, which took two floors; the Greater New York chapter of the National Foundation for Infantile Paralysis; and the Fund for the Republic. (Note: The Institute of Pacific Relations occupied 689 Fifth Avenue from 1943 to the 1950s; National Foundation for Infantile Paralysis, from 1948 to 1967; and Fund for the Republic, from 1953 to circa 1958.) Elizabeth Arden Inc. opened a men's boutique in the building in 1956 and, at one point, occupied eleven stories.

=== Late 20th century to present ===
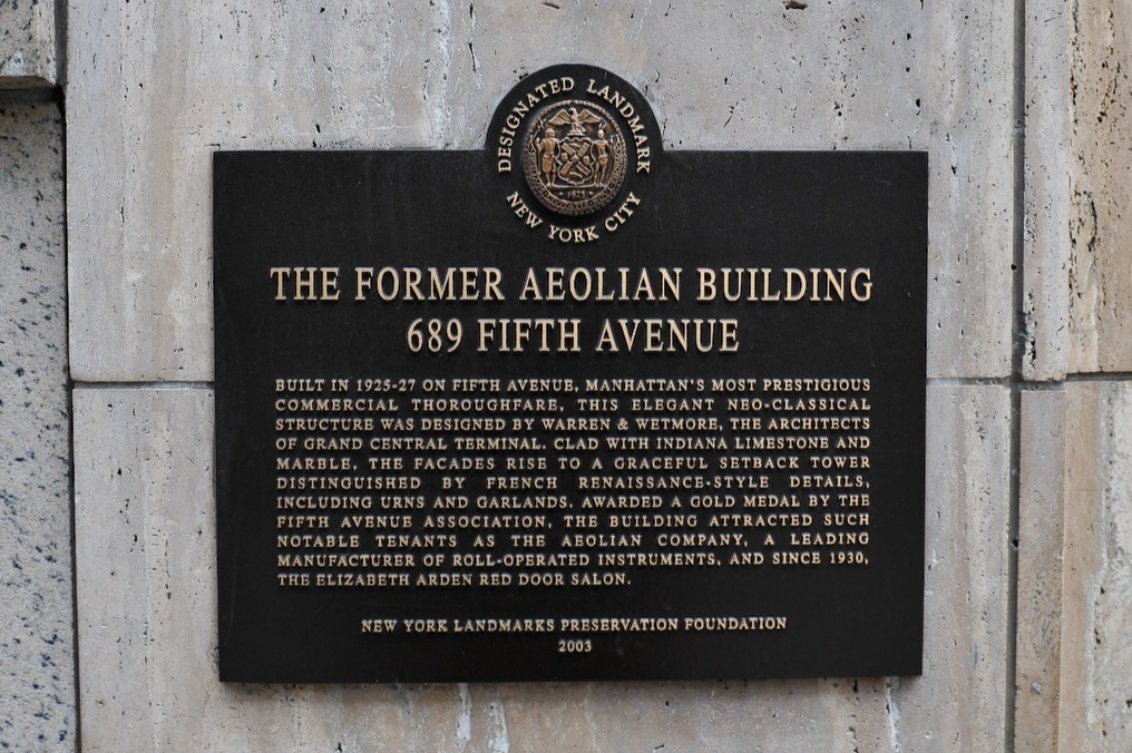
Landmarks plaque

Elizabeth Arden, the businesswoman, died in 1966. She had been the only owner of her company, but she had not planned for what would happen to the company's operations after she died. In 1969, the building was purchased by the Arden-Esquire Realty Company, a partnership headed by Larry Silverstein and Bernard H. Mendik. The next year, the corner space, formerly occupied by I. Miller, was leased by Aldo Gucci for $100/ft^{2} ($1,100/m^{2}) per year. Larry Silverstein arranged for Elizabeth Arden Inc. and Aldo Gucci to share the costs of remodeling the storefronts. The renovation was conducted by Weissberg Castro Associates, which used travertine marble and finely detailed stainless steel to harmonize with the character of the existing facade. The renovation cost $1 million in total and was completed in October 1970. The Gucci store in the building became the company's main store in New York City. According to Ernest Castro, one of the renovating architects, the building was probably the city's first to use finely detailed stainless steel decoration, as opposed to mechanically stamped panels.

A newer New York flagship for Gucci opened in 1980 at 685 Fifth Avenue, just across 54th Street, and the Gucci store at the Elizabeth Arden Building became a secondary branch selling shoes and luggage. The old Gucci space was leased to Façonnable in 1993. Three years later, Elizabeth Arden Inc. and Red Door Salons Inc. extended their leases in the northern storefront and planned a renovation of the salon in the Elizabeth Arden Building. Other tenants during this time included fashion company Kiton, whose offices faced the William H. Moore House to the south; the company ultimately moved to that house in 2002. Vornado Realty Trust acquired the building in 1999 and renamed it 689 Fifth Avenue.

Vornado placed the building on sale in April 2002, expecting to earn up to $75 million. Two months later, Façonnable announced plans to terminate its lease at 689 Fifth Avenue and move to Rockefeller Center. Subsequently, Vornado canceled the sale and sought a new tenant before it planned to place the building for sale again. The New York City Landmarks Preservation Commission (LPC) designated 689 Fifth Avenue as a landmark on December 10, 2002. Yamaha Artist Services opened a piano salon on the third floor in 2004, and fashion retailer Zara leased the corner storefront in 2005. Vornado proposed a renovation of the building's base in the early 2010s, a move that Manhattan Community Board 5 approved. Clothing retailer Massimo Dutti moved into the former Zara space in 2012, and Elizabeth Arden Inc. moved out the same year, being replaced by MAC Cosmetics. The MAC Cosmetics store closed permanently in 2021 due to the COVID-19 pandemic in New York City. Clothing store Canada Goose opened a store at 689 Fifth Avenue in 2022.

== Critical reception ==
In December 1926, the Fifth Avenue Association gave the Gould Realty Company an award for the Aeolian Building, which the association dubbed as the best new building erected around Fifth Avenue during that year. The sale of the building shortly afterward was characterized in The New York Times as "the first time on record that a gold medal building on Fifth Avenue has ever been offered at absolute public auction". According to the Real Estate Record and Guide, the building was a "graceful addition to the music and art center" around Fifth Avenue near 57th Street. The Elizabeth Arden salon's interior, along with a nearby salon operated by Helena Rubinstein, was described as "among the most luxurious" in the United States in the 1939 WPA Guide to New York City.

When the storefront was renovated in 1939, architectural critic Lewis Mumford called it "the most satisfactory piece of remodeling" on the upper part of Fifth Avenue. Similarly, critic Talbot Hamlin regarded the modifications as "harmonious with the old". In the 1980s, the building was further described by architectural writer Paul Goldberger as possibly the "most inventive merging of modern commercial design with French and classical architectural detail" of any New York City building.

== See also ==
- List of New York City Designated Landmarks in Manhattan from 14th to 59th Streets
