= Woodruff Leeming =

American architect

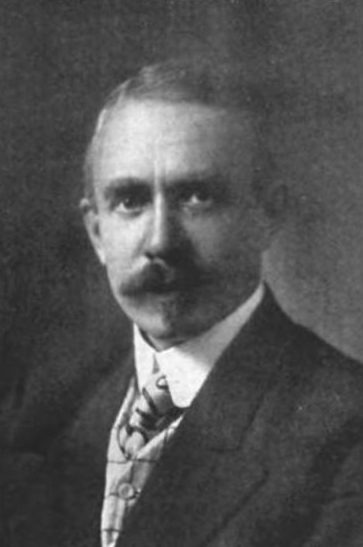
- Born: July 14, 1870; Quincy, Illinois
- Died: November 20, 1919 (aged 49); New Canaan, Connecticut
- Education: Adelphi College; Massachusetts Institute of Technology
- Occupation: Architect
- Spouse: Esther Howard (m. 1899)

Woodruff Leeming, AIA, (July 14, 1870 – November 20, 1919) was an American architect who practiced in the New York area.

== Biography ==
Born July 14, 1870, in Quincy, Illinois, he first trained at Adelphi College, and later the Massachusetts Institute of Technology. Early experience included working on the plans for the Cathedral of Saint John the Divine, New York (probably with Heins & LaFarge) before studying in Paris. Upon his return to America, he opened his own office. He served in World War I, joining as a major and later entering the Army Reserve Corps with the rank of lieutenant-colonel.

He married Esther Howard on November 6, 1899, and they had four children.

He resided in New Canaan, Connecticut, where he died on November 20, 1919.

== Works ==
He designed the 1893 rectory for the South Congregational Church, Chapel, Ladies Parlor, and Rectory, Brooklyn, New York, which is now a New York City Landmark.
