= Rizzoli Libri =

Italian book publishing division, former company in publishing book and textbooks

- Parent company: Mondadori Libri; (part of Mondadori group)
- Status: active (as division)
- Predecessor: imprints of RCS MediaGroup
Founded
1994	(as RCS Libri & Grandi Opere)
2016	(as Rizzoli Libri S.p.A.)
2017	(downsized as a trade book division)
- Founder: RCS MediaGroup
Successor
Rizzoli Education S.p.A.	(textbooks only)
Rizzoli International	(English publications only)
- Country of origin: Italy
Headquarters location
Milan	(registered office)
Segrate	(de facto)
- Key people: Enrico Selva Coddè (MD of Mondadori Libri, trade book area)
- Publication types: fiction; non-fiction books; textbooks (former)
Imprints
Rizzoli
Fabbri Editori
BUR
Rizzoli Lizard
Rizzoli Etas
Rizzoli Education	(under Rizzoli Edu.)
La Nuova Italia	(under Rizzoli Edu.)
Tramontana	(under Rizzoli Edu.)
Rizzoli Electa	(under Rizzoli Int'l)
Ex Libris	(under Rizzoli Int'l)
Universe Publishing	(under Rizzoli Int'l)
Welcome Books	(under Rizzoli Int'l)
Skira Rizzoli	(Rizzoli Int'l's joint venture)
Rizzoli Illustrati	(under Mondadori Electa)
Adelphi	(sold)
Archinto	(sold)
Bompiani	(sold)
Marsilio	(sold)
Skira	(sold)
Sonzogno	(sold)
- Revenue: €223 million (2014)
- Owners: Fininvest (53%); (via Mondadori group)
- Official website: www.rizzolilibri.it

Rizzoli Libri, formerly Rizzoli Libri S.p.A. and RCS Libri S.p.A. is an Italian book publisher and a division of Mondadori Libri, a wholly owned subsidiary of Arnoldo Mondadori Editore. RCS Libri was a former subsidiary of RCS MediaGroup, but in 2015, most of the book publishing division was sold to Arnoldo Mondadori Editore, with some imprints of RCS Libri, were either sold by RCS MediaGroup or Arnoldo Mondadori Editore to third parties, as part of an antitrust deal. RCS MediaGroup retained the brand Rizzoli for non-book publishing, while Arnoldo Mondadori Editore has the exclusive rights to use the brand Rizzoli in book publishing.

From 2016 to 2017, Rizzoli Libri S.p.A. was further dismantled into subsidiaries and divisions of Arnoldo Mondadori Editore. Rizzoli Libri (trade book section only) became a division of sub-holding company Mondadori Libri S.p.A., while Rizzoli Education S.p.A. became a subsidiary of Mondadori Libri S.p.A.; The international subsidiaries of the former Rizzoli Libri S.p.A.: Rizzoli International Publications and Rizzoli Bookstore, became the subsidiaries of Mondadori Electa S.p.A., itself a subsidiary of Mondadori Libri S.p.A.. Rizzoli International also operated the new brand Rizzoli Electa.

== History ==
=== Predecessors ===
BUR logo

RCS Libri S.p.A. was a subsidiary and the book publishing division of RCS MediaGroup (RCS stands for Rizzoli–Corriere della Sera); libri itself means books in Italian. A. Rizzoli & C. was founded by Angelo Rizzoli, a former printing apprentice. The company acquired 4 magazines to become a publishing company in 1927. A. Rizzoli & C. soon started to publish books, such as involved in the printing of Treccani Encyclopedia from 1929. The group founded the imprint Biblioteca Universale Rizzoli (BUR) in 1949. In the 1960s, the group started to open their own book store, including a branch in the New York city, as well as sister operation Rizzoli International Publications. The group was expanded into RCS MediaGroup after the acquisition of the newspaper Corriere della Sera in 1974.

In 1990, the group acquired Fabbri–Sonzogno–Etas, another publishing group. In 1993, RCS Media Group acquired full control of Fabbri–Sonzogno–Etas. Fabbri, Sonzogno, and Etas became the imprints of the group in publication.

In 1992, RCS Media Group acquired Sansoni Editore, which gave birth of the two brands Sansoni and Sansoni per la Scuola. In 1993, RCS MediaGroup acquired Bompiani.

=== Establishment of RCS Libri S.p.A. ===
The division RCS Libri & Grandi Opere was established in 1994, which included the imprints such as Fabbri. In 1998, RCS Libri acquired the textbook publisher Tramontana, merging with the group's existing textbook publishing business. In 2000, the group acquired Sfera Editore (a magazine publisher), Marsilio Editori (from De Michelis family) as well as French publisher Editions Flammarion. RCS MediaGroup became the largest book publisher in Italy after the deals. However, a decade later, RCS Libri sold Flammarion in 2012 for €251 million.

In 2007, the Italian Competition Authority started an investigation on 9 publishing companies, including RCS Libri, for an alleged anti-competitive conduct in the textbook market.

On 9 December 2013, the group signed an agreement with Telecom Italia on e-books and online edition of newspapers. It also included the ebooks of the imprints of RCS Libri at that time: Rizzoli, Bompiani, Fabbri, Adelphi, Archinto, Marsilio, Skira, and Sonzogno. RCS Media Group also sold the equity interest (48%) in the imprint Editions d'Art Albert Skirà (or known as Skira group) on 11 December 2013. Immediately after the transaction, RCS Libri, via Rizzoli International, still owned 49% stake of Skira Rizzoli Publications Inc., which was based in New York. Before the sales of the Skira group, the imprint Skira Rizzoli was considered within the scope of consolidation.

According to Publishers Weekly, the division RCS Libri had a revenue of €513.3 million in the financial year 2011 (not adjusted for the sale of Flammarion in 2012), or €298.6 million if excluding Flammarion. It was decreased to €273.3 million in 2012 and then €252 million in 2013 and €223 million in 2014. Moreover, the whole group was suffered from aggregate net losses in the 2010s, for example in financial years 2012, 2013 and 2014. The net loss was €218 million in 2013 and €110.8 million in 2014.

The market share of RCS Libri in fiction and non-fiction was 11.8% in 2014, according to Publishers Weekly, itself was quoting the figure from GfK.

=== Acquired by Mondadori group and downsizing as Rizzoli Libri division ===
In February 2015, it was reported that Arnoldo Mondadori Editore (Mondadori group) had submitted a non-binding offer to buy RCS Libri from RCS MediaGroup. It was reported that Rosellina Archinto, founder of the namesake imprint, re-acquired Archinto in July 2015. In October 2015, RCS MediaGroup announced to sell the whole division, with Mondadori group being the principal buyer, despite some subsidiaries and imprints of RCS Libri, were sold to other investors instead. For example, the controlling stake (58%) of Adelphi was sold to Roberto Calasso, who worked at Adelphi for many years. Furthermore, in March 2016, Italian Competition Authority (AGCM) ruled that Mondadori, after the acquisition, had to sell subsidiaries and imprints Bompiani, Marsilio Editori and Sonzogno. Marsilio (including the imprint Sonzogno) was sold back to De Michelis family's GEM S.r.l. while Bompiani was sold to Giunti Editore. Mondadori group retained the brands such as Rizzoli (in books only), BUR and Fabbri Editori. It also owned Rizzoli Lizard.

In April 2016, immediately after the takeover, RCS Libri S.p.A. was renamed to Rizzoli Libri S.p.A.. Rizzoli Libri S.p.A. was under Mondadori Libri S.p.A., a business unit of Mondadori group. At the time of the foundation in 2014, Mondadori Libri S.p.A. was the sub-holding company of the subsidiaries and imprints Piemme, Giulio Einaudi, Mondadori Education, Mondadori Electa, Sperling & Kupfer as well as joint venture Harlequin Mondadori.

Rizzoli Libri S.p.A. was further downsized by the transfer of the ownership of the overseas subsidiary Rizzoli International Publications to Mondadori Electa, with the trade book section of Rizzoli Libri S.p.A. being merged into the direct parent company Mondadori Libri S.p.A.. Mondadori Libri also absorbed Sperling & Kupfer S.p.A. and Edizioni Piemme S.p.A. on 1 January 2017. They were retained as divisions and imprints of Mondadori Libri. The trade book area of Mondadori Libri (including the imprint Rizzoli) and the textbook subsidiary and imprint Rizzoli Education, since 2018, were also under different corporate leadership, Enrico Selva Coddè and Antonio Porro, respectively. They were the Managing Directors (Italian: Direttore Generale) of Mondadori Libri. According to the publication of Mondadori group, the direct parent company of Rizzoli Education had also changed to aforementioned Mondadori Libri.

According to GfK, as of the financial year 2018, the downsized Rizzoli Libri had a market share of 4.8% (decreased from 4.9% year to year) in trade books, and the whole Mondadori group had a market share of 27.4% (decreased from 30.0% year to year).

== Former subsidiaries ==
=== Rizzoli Education ===
Logo of Rizzoli Education

Rizzoli Education S.p.A., formerly Rizzoli Education, was a division of Rizzoli Libri S.p.A.. After the trade book section of Rizzoli Libri S.p.A. was absorbed into Mondadori Libri S.p.A. in 2017, Rizzoli Education S.p.A. was retained as a subsidiary of aforementioned Mondadori Libri. In 2016, the first year of the acquisition of Rizzoli Libri group, Rizzoli Education and Mondadori group's existing subsidiary Mondadori Education, had a combined share of 24% in Italian textbook market, according to Publishers Weekly which itself quotes the figures from Mondadori group.

In 2019, Oxford University Press and Rizzoli Education renewed an agreement on distributing books. Oxford University Press signed the first agreement with La Nuova Italia Editrice in 1978, now a brand of Rizzoli Education.

Rizzoli Education also used other imprints such as Fabbri Editori (acquired by RCS Libri in 1990), Tramontana (acquired in 2000), Sansoni per la Scuola (acquired in 1992), Etas (acquired in 1990), Rizzoli Languages, Calderini, Edagricole, Edizioni del Quadrifoglio and Markes.

=== Rizzoli International Publications ===
RCS Libri, via RCS International Books B.V., had an overseas subsidiary, Rizzoli International Publications Inc., also known as Rizzoli New York or Rizzoli USA. The company was based in New York City, the United States. Rizzoli International acquired the imprint Welcome Books. Inc., from Welcome Enterprises in 2014. The American division also contained Rizzoli Bookstore, which was located in NoMad, New York City since 2015. After the 2016 takeover of RCS Libri, both Rizzoli International and Rizzoli Bookstore are now part of Mondadori group. However, the intermediate parent company was changed from RCS Libri to Mondadori Electa, another subsidiary of Mondadori group. As of 2019, Rizzoli International Publications also owned the imprints Ex Libris (established in 2011) and Universe Publishing (established in 1990).

Mondadori group launched the imprint Rizzoli Electa in January 2018, but the international illustrated department of Rizzoli Libri would be integrated into the fellow division Mondadori Electa. The brand Rizzoli Electa would be operated by Mondadori Electa instead. Or in other words, the international division of Rizzoli Libri, as well as future publication that under Rizzoli brand in English language (as Rizzoli Electa), would be operated by Mondadori Electa instead. Mondadori Electa also owned the imprint Rizzoli Illustrati Italia at that time.

Despite the parent companies of Rizzoli International selling the publishing companies Flammarion (in 2012 by RCS MediaGroup) and Marsilio (in 2016 by Mondadori group), Rizzoli International still distributed the books by the two imprints.
