= 745 Seventh Avenue =

Office skyscraper in Manhattan, New York

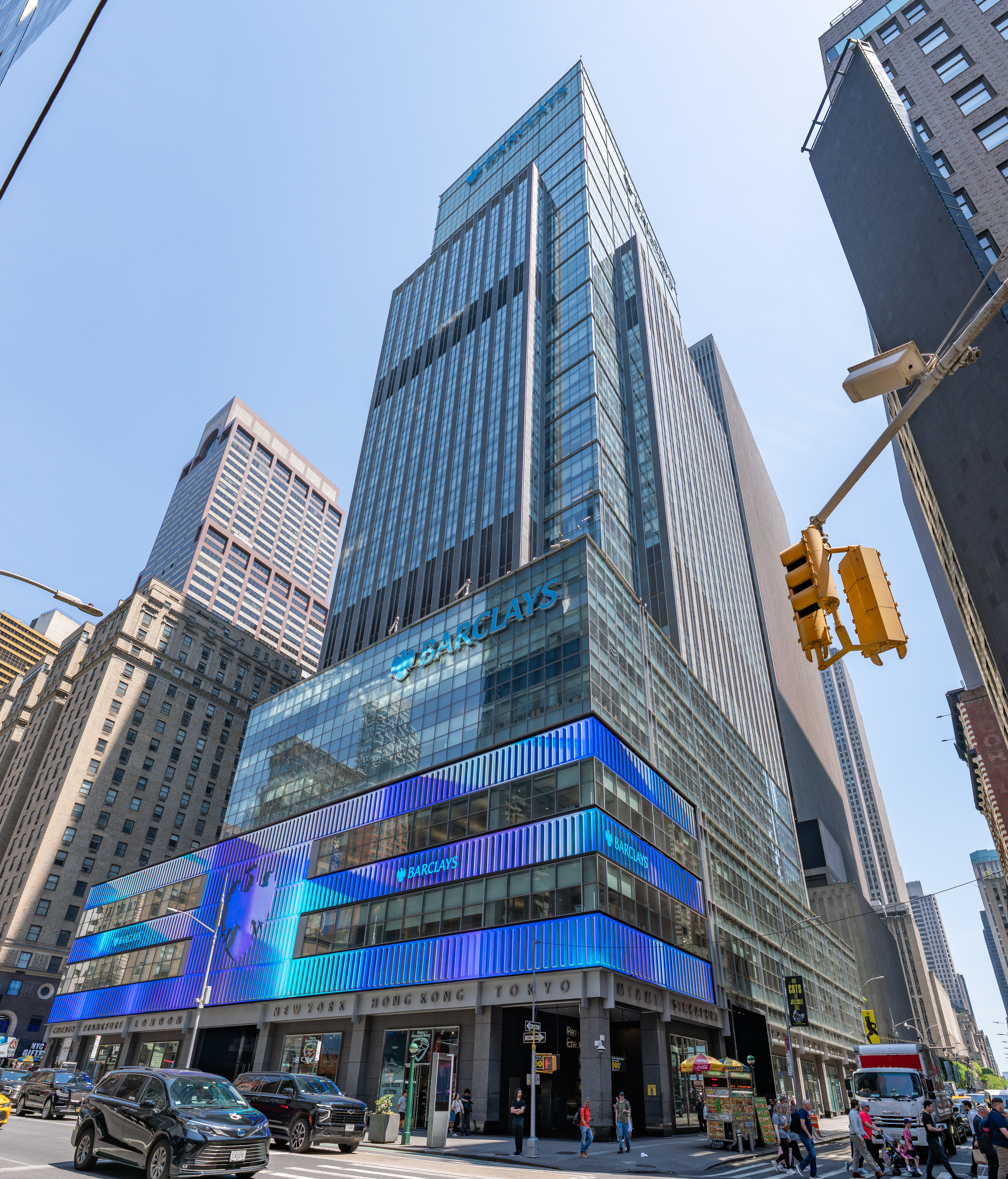
- 745 Seventh Avenue in May 2026

General information
- Status: Completed
- Type: Commercial/Office
- Location: Manhattan, New York, US
- Coordinates: 40°45′37.91″N 73°58′58.62″W
- Construction started: 1999
- Completed: 2001
- Opening: 2002
- Owner: Barclays

Height
- Roof: 575 ft (175 m)

Technical details
- Floor count: 38
- Floor area: 1,020,000 sq ft (95,000 m^{2})

Design and construction
- Architect: Kohn Pedersen Fox
- Developer: Rockefeller Group
- Other designers: Gensler
- Main contractor: Tishman Construction

745 Seventh Avenue (also known as the Lehman Brothers Building and Barclays Building) is a 575 ft (175 m), 38-story skyscraper in the Midtown Manhattan neighborhood of New York City, New York. Designed by Kohn Pedersen Fox and originally built in 2001 for financial services firm Morgan Stanley, it was instead purchased by competing firm Lehman Brothers and served as Lehman's headquarters until the bank's collapse in 2008. The building has since served as the headquarters of Barclays' investment banking division.

The building occupies the western end of a block bounded by Seventh Avenue, 49th Street, Sixth Avenue, and 50th Street. It is made of steel, granite, and glass and is topped by a glass parapet. The building also features 15,000 square feet (1,400 m^{2}) (Note: The New York Times reported in 2008 that the screens were 15,000 square feet (1,400 m^{2}), but Barclays' website says the screens are 7,046 square feet (654.6 m^{2}) after a 2019 renovation.) of screen displays incorporated into the facade of its third through fifth stories. The building is bounded to the east by a public plaza running through the block from 49th to 50th Street, and underground passageways connect the building to the New York City Subway's 49th Street station and the Rockefeller Center's underground mall. It has a floor area of 1,020,000 sq ft (95,000 m^{2}).

== Site ==
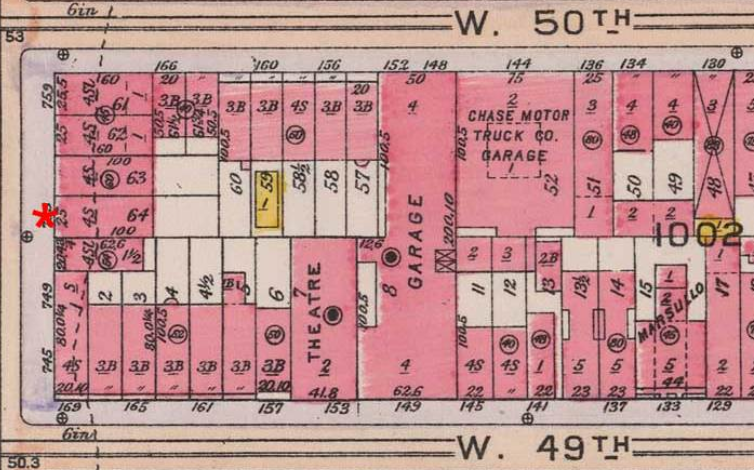
A 1916 property map of the block now occupied by 745 Seventh Avenue

745 Seventh Avenue is in the Times Square neighborhood in Midtown Manhattan, New York City, United States. It is located just north of the actual intersection known as Times Square and occupies the western part of the block bounded by 50th Street to the north, 49th Street to the south, Seventh Avenue to the west, and Sixth Avenue to the east. The lot covers an area of 62,459 ft^{2} (5,802.6 m^{2}) with a frontage of 200.83 ft (61.21 m) along Seventh Avenue and a depth of 350 ft (110 m). The building shares the block with 1251 Avenue of the Americas to the east. Other neighboring buildings include 750 Seventh Avenue to the west, the Winter Garden Theatre to the northwest, The Michelangelo to the north, 1251 Avenue of the Americas to the northeast, and 1221 Avenue of the Americas to the southeast.

The site was once home to the Brass Rail, a four-floor restaurant and tavern with a cocktail lounge. The restaurant originally opened as a sandwich shop during the prohibition era and grew to have a seating capacity of more than 1,000. The eastern end of the site was also home to the Embassy 49th Street Theatre, which first opened in 1914. The theater was developed and managed by actor-producer Charles Hopkins and had a seating capacity of approximately 300. It screened British and foreign films early in its lifetime before later becoming a pornographic theater, serving as the location for the premiere of Deep Throat in 1972. The theater was demolished in 1987.

== History ==
=== Initial development plans ===
In late 1986, the property was owned by the Rockefeller Group, a real estate development company in charge of developing the western blocks of Rockefeller Center. As the real estate economy was booming, the company developed plans for a new building on the property. By 1989, the property was largely an empty lot, with the exception of a small plaza called Exxon Park occupying the easternmost section and a small four-story brick building facing 49th Street.

In 1989, the Rockefeller Group announced plans to build a 55-story office building, then called Rockefeller Plaza West, as an expansion of the Rockefeller Center complex. The proposal, designed by Kohn Pedersen Fox, included a rehearsal studio, a restaurant and cabaret, and additional retail space, as well as below-ground connections to the Rockefeller Center concourse and surrounding subway lines. It would have had a total of 1,360,000 sq ft (126,000 m^{2}) of floor space, made possible by purchasing air rights from older buildings in Rockefeller Center, which were then also owned by the Rockefeller Group. To purchase the air rights, the developers applied for a special permit under New York City Zoning Resolution § 74-79, which allowed a developer with a "chain of ownership" over multiple contiguous properties to transfer air rights from one of their properties to another.

The building's design was well received by critics. It featured a limestone and glass facade with stainless steel ornamentations, drawing comparisons to the design of the center's older buildings and contrasting it with the monolithic design of the center's more recent buildings. Paul Goldberger wrote in The New York Times that the building "does not look like the RCA Building and it does not look like the Exxon Building, either, yet it looks capable of sitting comfortably beside both." The design won a citation in the Progressive Architecture magazine.

The proposal was approved by the Landmarks Preservation Commission and Board of Estimate in May 1990, and work to clear the site began soon after. The building was expected to begin construction in 1991, take three years to build, and cost in "the half-billion dollar range." Shortly after work began, however, the project became involved in disputes over development rights, and after the economy went into recession, the project was scrapped, with the air rights transfer being abandoned. In 1994, Rockefeller Group received permission from the city to turn the site into a parking lot until an anchor tenant was found for the development. The parking lot had 200 spaces.

=== Modern development ===
==== Morgan Stanley agreement ====
As the city's office market began experiencing a resurgence in 1997, 745 Seventh Avenue was one of only four major sites available for development in Midtown. Rockefeller Group began negotiating with various potential tenants in seeking a renewed development on the site. Several firms expressed interest in occupying most or all of the Rockefeller West site, including Morgan Stanley, which already occupied space at 1585 Broadway one block away and 750 Seventh Avenue across the street. At the time, the site was still being used as a parking lot.

Financial services company Bear Stearns was among the larger companies negotiating a deal; its lease at 245 Park Avenue was set to expire in 2002, and the building required major renovations if the company chose to stay there. Bear Stearns sought co-ownership of the development and required large trading floors at the base of the building which would require a partial redesign of the initial 55-story proposal. At the time Rockefeller Group also negotiated the possibility of a smaller building for other tenants like Reuters. These negotiations ultimately failed, however, and after further negotiations with Guardian Life Insurance also failed, Rockefeller Group began negotiations with Morgan Stanley in January 1998. The two companies discussed the development for 11 months, with negotiations almost breaking down in October, temporarily leading the developers to seek PricewaterhouseCoopers as a tenant before Morgan Stanley resumed discussions.

Morgan Stanley signed a letter of intent in August 1998, expressing its interest in taking over the Rockefeller West site. In November 1998, Morgan Stanley and Rockefeller Group finalized negotiations and signed a deal to begin working on a new development at the site. Kohn Pedersen Fox was once again placed in charge of the design. Under the arrangement, Rockefeller Group would continue to own the land, while Morgan Stanley would own the building. In exchange, Morgan Stanley would pay ground rent for the land for 30 years, after which Morgan Stanley and Rockefeller Group would each gain 50% ownership of both the building and the underlying land. Morgan Stanley intended to use the building to supplement its headquarters at 1585 Broadway, desiring to keep its workforce concentrated in one area as part of a "Midtown urban campus."

==== Construction ====
By March 1999, the parking lot on the site was about to be cleared. In addition, Tishman Construction was hired as the general contractor. Tishman subcontracted the electrical work to several firms; the electrical contract was delayed due to a shortage of skilled electricians, who were simultaneously working on several other towers nearby, such as 1540 Broadway and 5 Times Square. The project was given a "super-fast-track" 25-month timeframe, driven by Morgan Stanley's impending lease expirations elsewhere in the city. As such, Gensler, which was placed in charge of interior design, was planning the building's interior while Kohn Pederson Fox was still designing the base building. Morgan Stanley also sought to award at least 15% of the construction contracts to minority-owned businesses and at least 5% to women-owned businesses. In addition, the project employed apprentices who had graduated from the city's vocational high schools. Gregory Clement, one of the lead architects of the building, compared the project to the previous development planned in 1990:

That 55-story building was a speculative office building; this is built specifically for Morgan Stanley, so its technical requirements, space requirements and other needs have been apparent from the beginning.

During construction, a sheeting and shoring system was used to prevent movement from the Seventh Avenue Subway running below the site. Furthermore, every floor on the building was raised to accommodate cables and wires so that the building would have the capacity to serve its occupant even as technological demands grew. To accommodate delivery trucks, Tishman built a temporary loading dock behind the building in what had been Exxon Park, but restored and "enhanced" the plaza once construction was finished. Tishman also built a temporary office on-site, and the build team coordinated off-site retreats with an outside facilitator. As many as 1,500 workers were involved in construction at the project's peak.

The building was topped out during November 2000, less than eight months after construction began, and was on track to be finished within the 25-month time frame required by Tishman's contract. Originally, Morgan Stanley had planned to relocate 3,700 workers to the building from the World Trade Center, mainly from its trading and institutional sales departments. Between 1585 Broadway and 745 Seventh Avenue, Morgan Stanley would be able to accommodate a total of 5,000 traders.

==== Sale to Lehman Brothers and completion ====
Morgan Stanley's sentiment shifted after the collapse of the World Trade Center during the September 11 attacks, which exposed the vulnerability of concentrating workers in one area dependent on the same electrical grid and services. At the time, Morgan Stanley's backup facilities and trading departments were concentrated in Times Square. The company deemed the building's proximity to its headquarters a risk, electing instead to lease space in other parts of Manhattan and elsewhere in the New York metropolitan area. Morgan Stanley CEO John J. Mack, who had been the project's largest proponent, had also been ousted from the company; The Wall Street Journal said the idea of selling the partly-complete building was "more palatable" as a result. By then, the building was worth $450 million, and real-estate experts believed that it could be leased for $60 per square foot ($650/m^{2}) despite the attacks.

In October 2001, Morgan Stanley sold the building to Lehman Brothers, which had just been displaced from its headquarters at 3 World Financial Center due to the attacks and was leasing rooms at the nearby Sheraton Times Square Hotel. The company was urgently seeking a new headquarters, since the alternative was waiting one-and-a-half years for its original building to be renovated. The sale price was variously cited as $650 million or $700 million; it was the only major office-building purchase in Manhattan in the four months after the September 11 attacks. The deal was at the time the most expensive purchase of a New York City office tower on a square-foot basis, at $650–$700 per square foot ($7,000–$7,500/m^{2}). The Rockefeller Group maintained its ownership stake after the deal. After selling the building, Morgan Stanley had to lease about 500 to 700 thousand square feet (46,000 to 65,000 m^{2}) elsewhere. Morgan Stanley went on to sublease office space elsewhere in the city before purchasing the former Texaco Headquarters in Purchase, New York in an effort to disperse its operations. Meanwhile, Lehman planned to sell or lease out its former space after buying 745 Seventh Avenue; the firm ultimately sold its ownership stake in 3 World Financial Center in 2002.

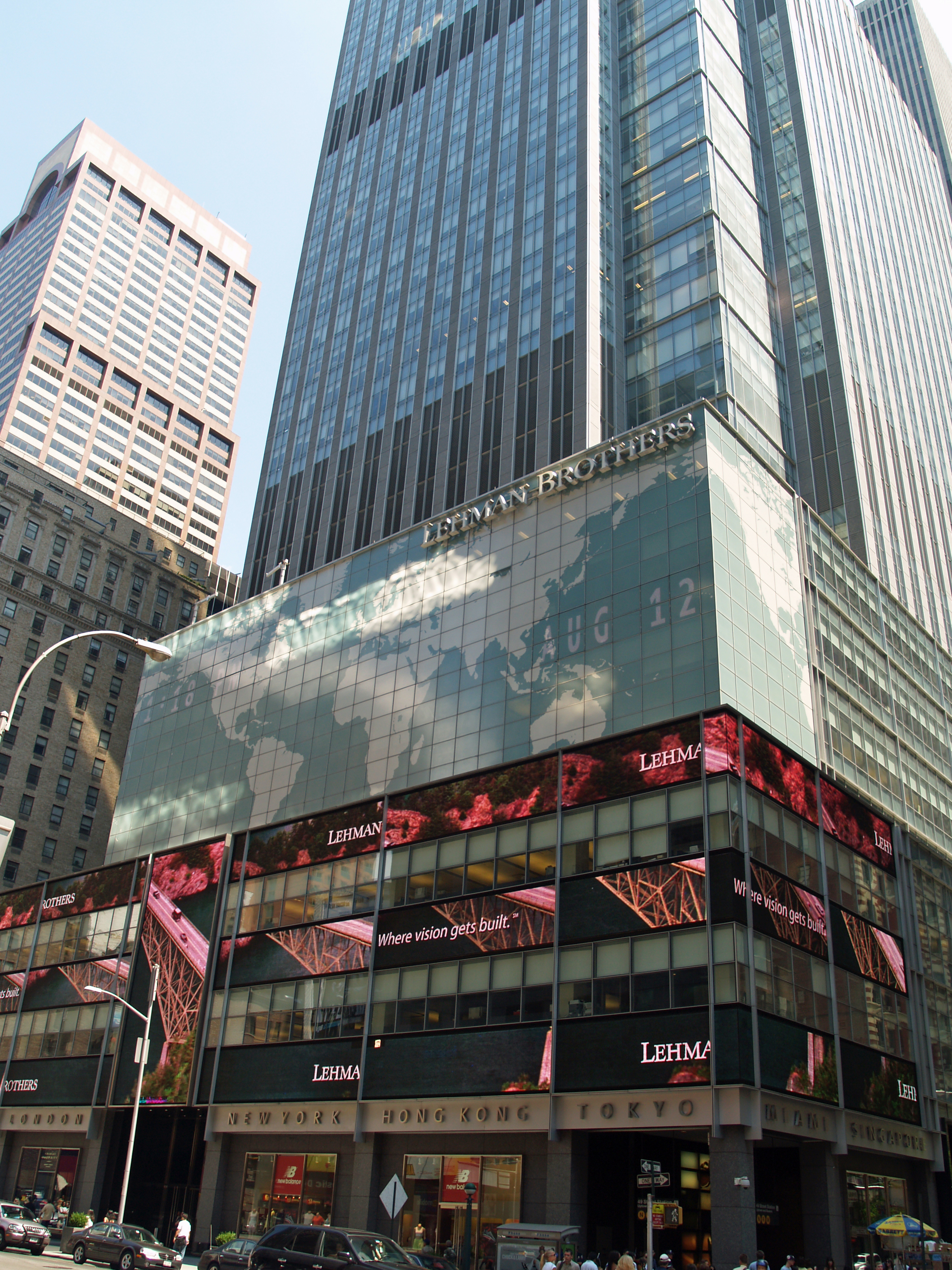
745 Seventh Avenue while under the ownership of Lehman Brothers

Upon purchasing 745 Seventh Avenue, Lehman Brothers was required by city zoning regulations to either devote 5% of the building's floor area to entertainment uses, or donate a similar amount for another entertainment space in the Theater District. To fulfill this requirement, Lehman proposed funding 5% of the Alvin Ailey American Dance Theater's new building at 55th Street and Ninth Avenue; city officials approved this proposal in 2002. Back at 745 Seventh Avenue, there were few adjustments left for Lehman to make. The building was already designed for the securities industry and featured the large, open trading floors on the lower levels and standard office space in the upper levels that the company desired. Lehman nevertheless worked with the construction companies previously contracted by Morgan Stanley to complete an additional $80 million in interior design adjustments—which included redesigning the top two floors to add executive offices—before occupying the building in 2002.

=== Usage ===
==== Lehman occupancy and sale ====
745 Seventh Avenue was the last building developed by the Rockefeller Group until 30 East 29th Street in 2019. Shortly after the building was completed, Rockefeller Group retrofitted the building with Wi-Fi. By 2004, Lehman had outgrown 745 Seventh Avenue and was looking for additional space nearby. Further growth prompted the company to consider an entirely new headquarters by 2007; by then, it was renting an additional 2.4 million square feet (220,000 m^{2}) in other buildings such as 1271 Avenue of the Americas, 1301 Avenue of the Americas, and 399 Park Avenue.

Lehman Brothers became implicated in the subprime mortgage crisis in 2007 after closing its subprime lender due to poor conditions in the mortgage market. The company began taking on major losses in 2008 due to its heavy positions in subprime mortgages. At the time, the Financial Times regarded the building as "one of the highest regarded office towers in Manhattan," though the newspaper reported that brokers had not heard anything about a potential sale of the building. There were concerns among real-estate industry executives that, if Lehman were to become insolvent, the building could become a white elephant. Lehman declared bankruptcy on September 15 of that year; the following day, Barclays announced it would purchase most of Lehman's North American operations, including 745 Seventh Avenue, for $1.75 billion. Most of the purchase price, $1.5 billion, was derived from the cost of 745 Seventh Avenue and two New Jersey data centers. The agreement was later revised so that Barclays acquired only Lehman Brothers' core operations and 745 Seventh Avenue.

==== Barclays occupancy ====
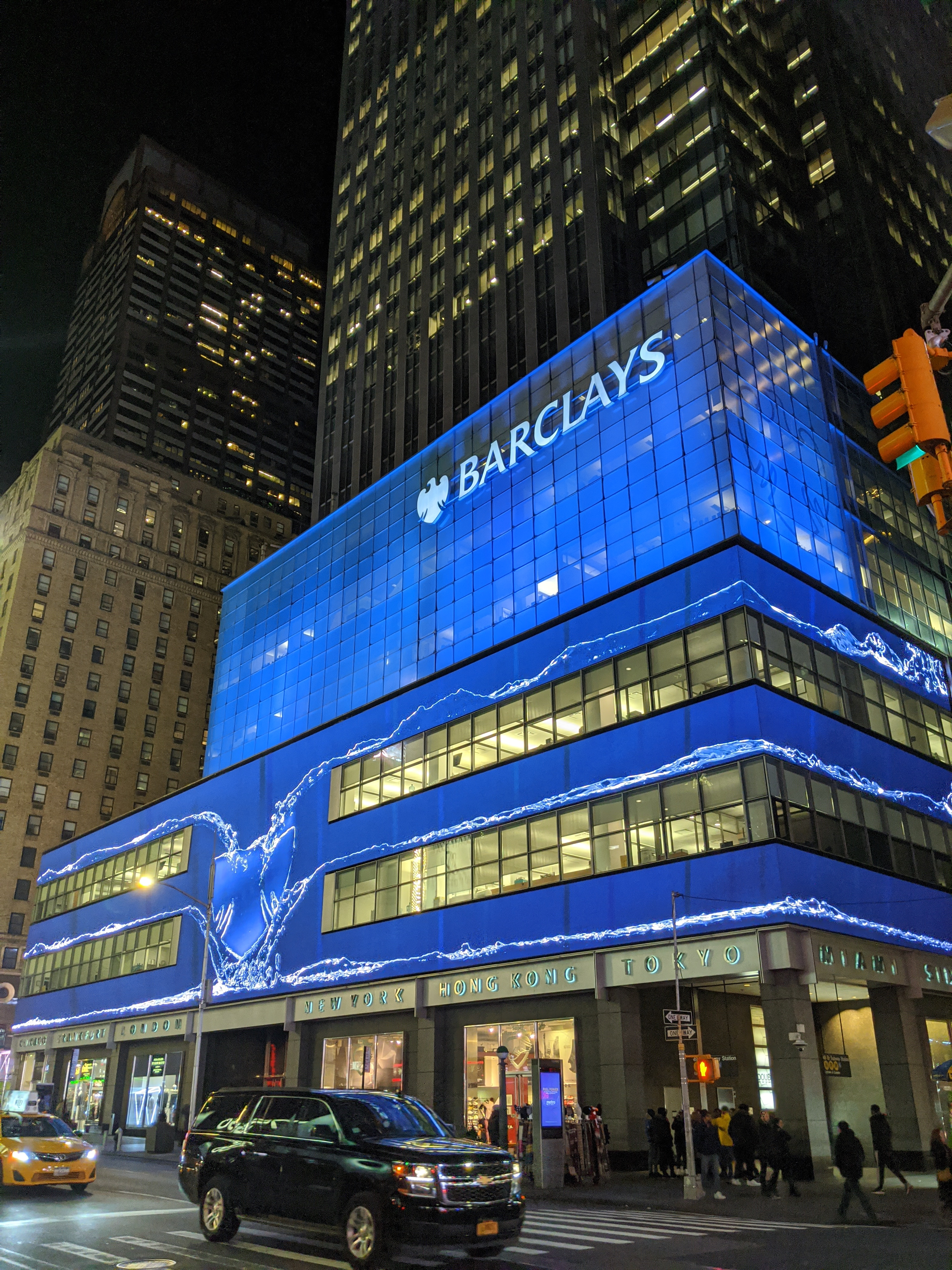
745 Seventh Avenue in 2020 under the ownership of Barclays

Barclays finalized its purchase of Lehman Brothers' core operations on September 20, 2008, with the figure being reduced to $1.3 billion, the majority of which was for the headquarters and data centers. The sale valued 745 Seventh Avenue at $960 million, while the two data centers were priced at $330 million. After Barclays acquired 745 Seventh Avenue and Lehman's core operations, most of Lehman's employees in the building began working for Barclays. Lehman continued to exist as a separate entity operating a small number of real-estate properties; its remaining employees relocated to the nearby 1271 Avenue of the Americas. After taking over the building, Barclays began displaying its logo on the building's screens.

Barclays used the building as the headquarters for its investment banking division Barclays Capital, with plans to consolidate staff there. Barclays's CEO Bob Diamond moved his office to the building in 2009, occupying space on the second floor, overlooking the company's fixed-income trading room. Barclays announced plans in 2010 to install a logo measuring 13.5 feet (4.1 m) high at the top of the facade, as well as a sign spelling out its name in 10-foot-tall (3.0 m) letters. The company also wanted to replace the transparent glass parapet on the building's roof with translucent panels that could be illuminated from behind.

The building was valued at $1 billion by the late 2010s. In 2019, Barclays renovated the building's street-level screen display. In 2020, amid the COVID-19 pandemic, Barclays was considering relocating its offices out of 745 Seventh Avenue to Hudson Yards. In late 2025, Barclays announced plans to spend $1 billion on a four-year renovation of the building, which is planned to start in 2026. The project will include a renovation of the building's trading floors as well as "new amenities throughout the building." Construction is expected to finish in 2030.

== Design ==
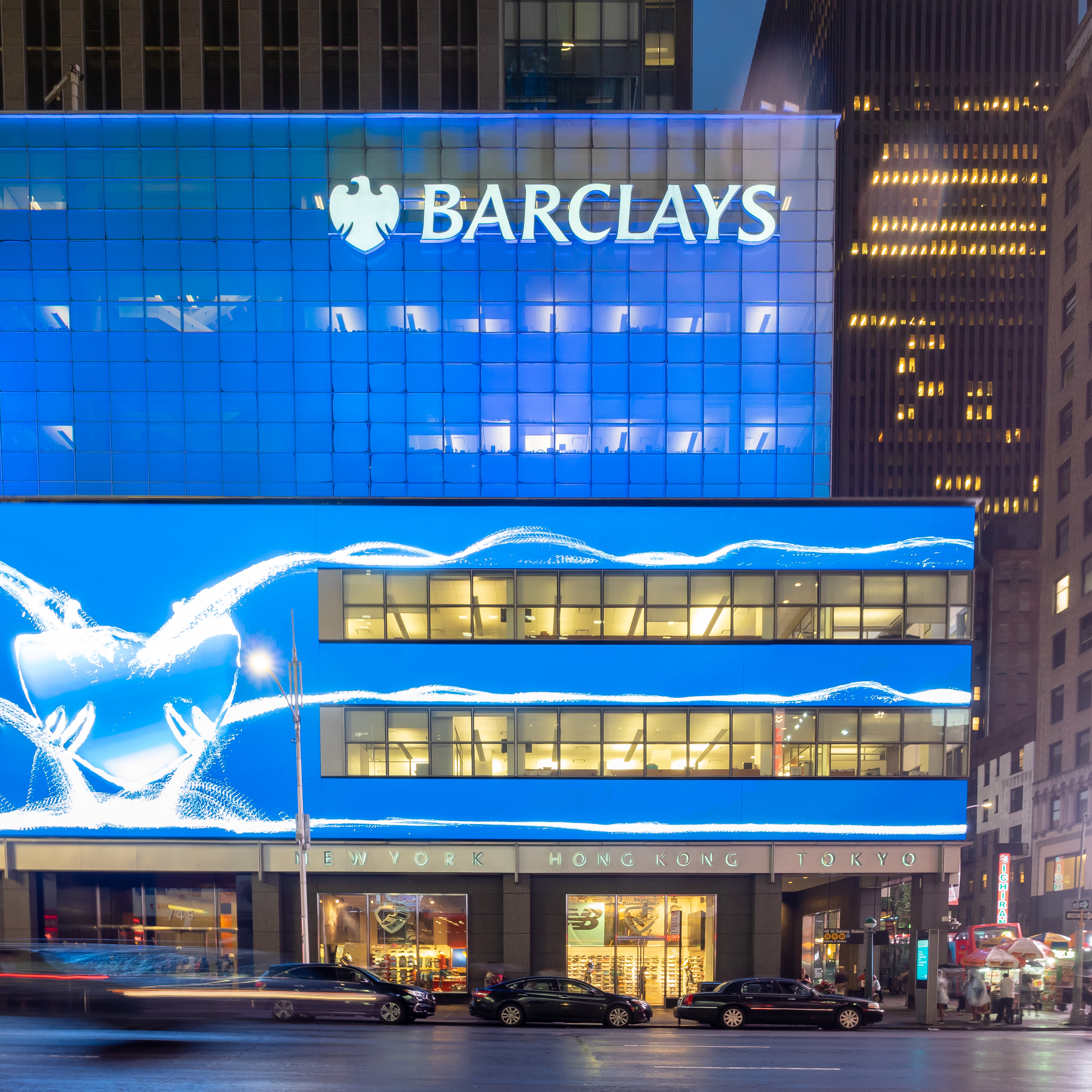
745 Seventh Avenue's street-level screen display

745 Seventh Avenue was designed by Kevin Kennon and Gregory Clement of Kohn Pedersen Fox. The structure is 575 feet (175 m) tall, with 38 floors, and is made of steel, granite, and glass. It has 15,000 square feet (1,400 m^{2}) of video screens facing the adjacent streets, which spans the third through fifth stories. There are three horizontal signs, one each on the facades along 49th Street, Seventh Avenue, and 50th Street. The signs on 49th and 50th streets extend halfway down the facade, while the sign on Seventh Avenue spans the entire facade; the windows are built around the signs. There is also a large vertical sign, originally created by Imaginary Forces, above the main entrance on Seventh Avenue. Morgan Stanley had originally planned to use these screens to display live images, but when Lehman Brothers bought the building, it instead displayed landscape images, such as wheat fields and waves. Barclays replaced the original screens in 2019, which by that time had become the oldest LED display in Times Square. The new screens were designed by Daktronics and have a surface area of 7,046 square feet (654.6 m^{2}) as well as nearly five times the resolution of the original screens.

Under the building is a passageway that serves as a privately owned public space, which runs through the block between 49th and 50th streets; it has an area of 8,700 square feet (810 m^{2}). There is also a public plaza covering 15,648 square feet (1,453.7 m^{2}) at grade level, which is "L"-shaped and is shared with 1251 Avenue of the Americas.

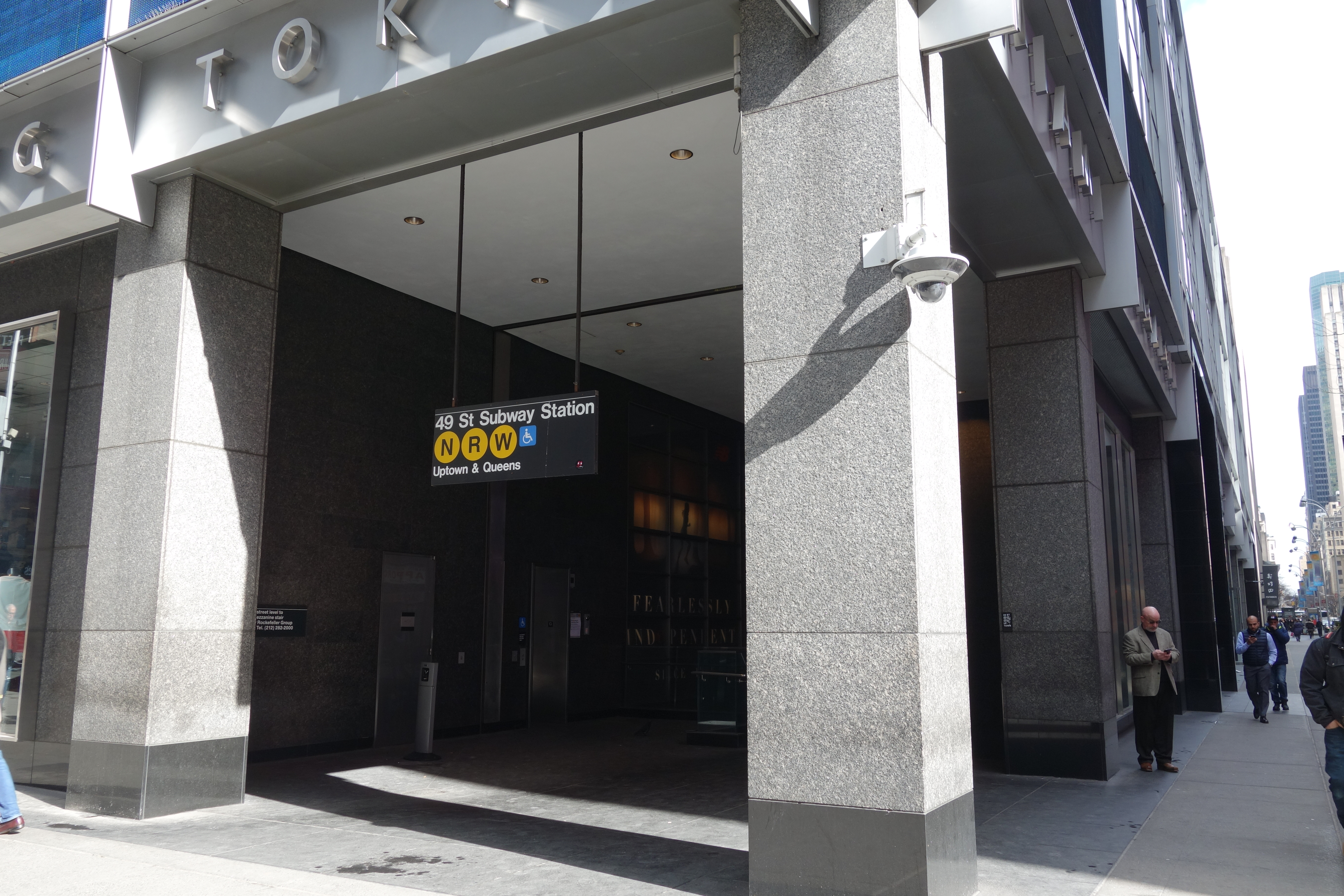
The building's entrance to the 49th Street station

745 Seventh Avenue has about 1 million square feet (0.093×10^{6} m^{2}) of space. As designed, the building incorporated an entrance to the New York City Subway's 49th Street station and a passageway to Rockefeller Center's underground mall. Inside are open plan floors with financial management desks; the desks are placed on raised floors, allowing wiring to be installed underneath the floors. When built, the 2nd through 7th floors were used as trading floors. The building also had a cafeteria on the 9th floor and a fitness center on the 21st. The 31st and 32nd floors were used as an executive suite, with a dining room, board rooms, and offices. The 31st floor had Lehman Brothers' executive board room, which originally was decorated with Georges Schreiber's 1945 painting of the Brooklyn Bridge.

== Reception ==
Robert A. M. Stern wrote that 745 Seventh Avenue was "more accepting of its Times Square neighborhood than its predecessor," referring to the design initially proposed for the site in 1989. Patrick McGeehan of The New York Times wrote in 2008 that, when it came to New York City's 2000s financial turmoil, "few places in Manhattan could be more revealing than the incandescent office tower at 745 Seventh Avenue". The 2010 version of the AIA Guide to New York City noted how the form of the building's upper floors resembled "intertwined towers."

Paul Goldberger praised the building's screen displays in The New Yorker, writing that "the sign is visually stunning, like an IMAX screen in the middle of a Manhattan street, and it all but dematerializes the facade, turning it from an object of glass and metal into a cavalcade of constantly changing colors and shapes." Peter Frankfurt of Imaginary Forces, the company that designed the original screens, criticized Lehman Brothers' decision to display landscapes on the screen rather than live market information, calling the display "a motion billboard that's not live."
