= 750 Seventh Avenue =

Office skyscraper in Manhattan, New York

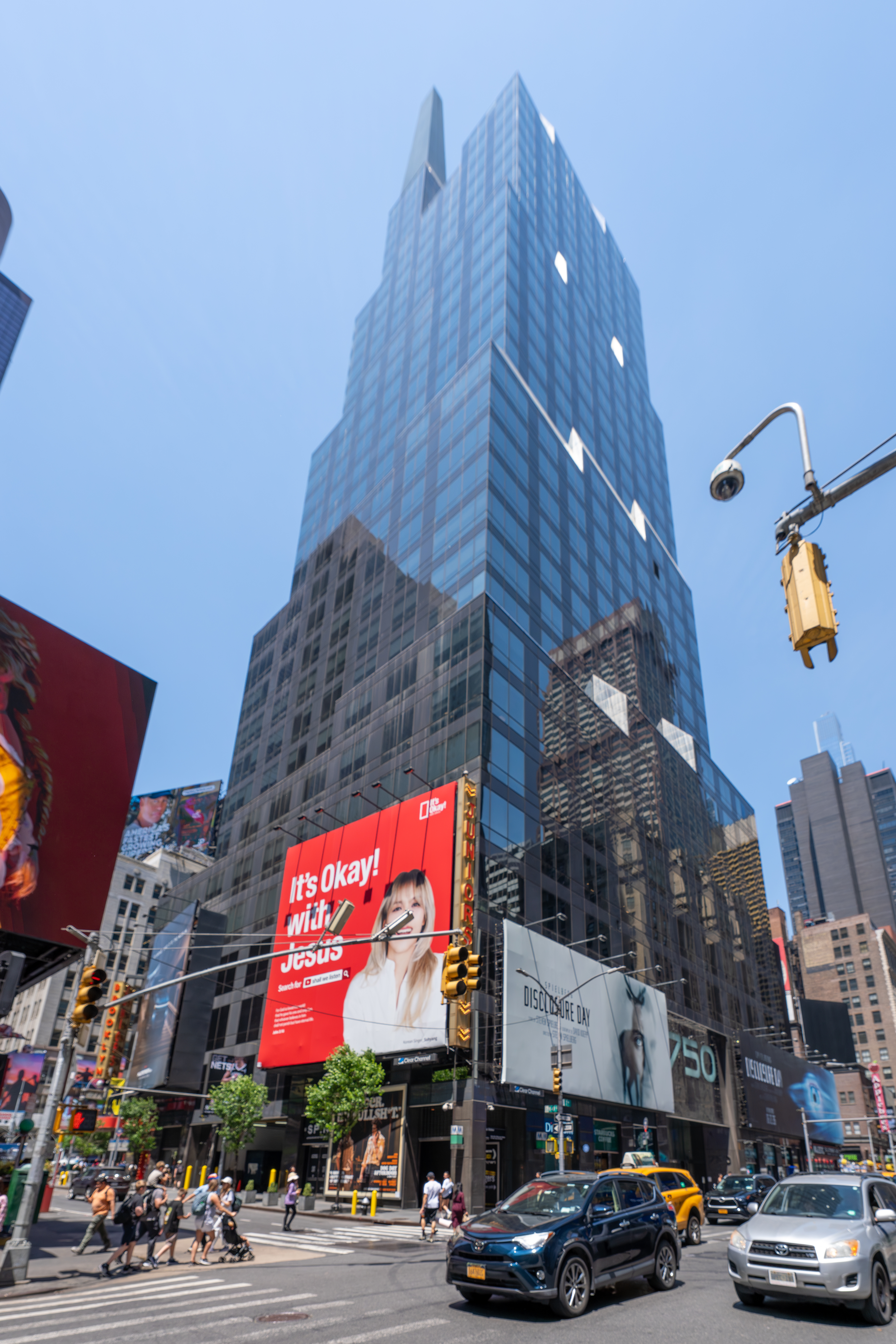
- Interactive map of the 750 Seventh Avenue area

General information
- Status: Completed
- Type: Office
- Location: 750 Seventh Avenue; Manhattan, New York, US
- Coordinates: 40°45′39″N 73°59′02″W
- Completed: 1989
- Owner: Fosterlane Management

Height
- Roof: 615 ft (187 m)
- Top floor: 514 ft (157 m)

Technical details
- Floor count: 36
- Floor area: 561,139 sq ft (52,131.5 m^{2})

Design and construction
- Architect: Kevin Roche
- Developer: Solomon Equities

750 Seventh Avenue is a 36-story office building in the Midtown Manhattan neighborhood of New York City. The building was designed by Kevin Roche of Roche-Dinkeloo and developed by David and Jean Solomon. 750 Seventh Avenue occupies a site on the north side of 49th Street between Broadway and Seventh Avenue. Since 1994, the building has mostly been occupied by the offices of financial services company Morgan Stanley. The building contains a black glass facade with large signs as well as etched-glass panels. On the upper stories, the exterior has setbacks in a spiral pattern, which terminate in an offset glass pinnacle. When the building opened, several critics compared its design to a smokestack and to a glass pyramid.

Solomon Equities had developed 750 Seventh Avenue as a speculative development in 1989 on the site of the Rivoli Theatre, a movie theater. When the building was completed, it had no tenants until the law firm Olwine, Connelly, Chase, O'Donnell & Wehyer leased space in April 1990. Olwine Connelly disbanded in 1991 without ever paying rent, and the Solomons placed the building into bankruptcy shortly afterward. The building was taken over by a consortium of banks, who leased some space to law firm Mendes & Mount and accounting firm Ernst & Young. Morgan Stanley bought the building in 1994 to supplement its space at nearby 1585 Broadway. Real-estate firm Hines and the General Motors Pension Fund bought 750 Seventh Avenue in 2000 and resold it in 2011 to Fosterlane Management.

== Site ==
750 Seventh Avenue occupies the southern two-thirds of the city block bounded by Seventh Avenue to the east, 49th Street to the south, Broadway to the west, and 50th Street to the north. It is two blocks north of Times Square in the Theater District of Midtown Manhattan in New York City. The mostly trapezoidal land lot covers 22,015 ft^{2} (2,045.3 m^{2}), with a frontage of 159.33 ft (48.56 m) on Seventh Avenue and a depth of 137.77 ft (41.99 m). An entrance to the New York City Subway's 49th Street station, serving the N, R, and W trains, is within the base of the building. Another subway entrance, to the 50th Street station (serving the 1 train), is just north of the building's Broadway entrance.

The surrounding area is part of Manhattan's Theater District and contains many Broadway theatres. Nearby buildings include The Theater Center, Brill Building, and Ambassador Theatre to the west; Paramount Plaza to the northwest; the Winter Garden Theatre to the north; The Michelangelo to the northeast; 745 Seventh Avenue and 1251 Avenue of the Americas to the east; and Crowne Plaza Times Square Manhattan to the southwest. The site was formerly occupied by the Rivoli Theatre, a 2,400-seat movie palace that opened in 1917 under the management of Samuel Roxy Rothafel. Thomas W. Lamb had designed the Rivoli in a style resembling the Parthenon, with a triangular pediment and grand colonnade; these were removed in the late 1980s by the theater's owner, United Artists (UA). The theater was demolished in 1988.

== Architecture ==
750 Seventh Avenue was designed by Kevin Roche of Roche-Dinkeloo. The building measures 498 ft (152 m) to its roof and 615 ft (187 m) to its pinnacle. It was completed in 1989 in the postmodern style and has 36 floors. The facade of 750 Seventh Avenue is made of black glass. The facade contains 860 etched-glass rectangles designed by Thomas Emerson. To comply with city regulations that required large signs along buildings in Times Square, the building has electronic signage on its glass facade. The signs were not initially installed when the building was completed in 1990, but four billboards were erected after financial-services firm Morgan Stanley bought the building in 1994.

In designing the building's massing, Roche was not constrained by a small site or the need to acquire air rights from neighboring buildings, unlike the nearly contemporary Carnegie Hall Tower. There are setbacks along 750 Seventh Avenue's exterior, which ascend in a counterclockwise direction, giving the appearance of a spiral. The setbacks are placed on all sides of the building and span a small section of every floor. As a result, all the floors are different in size. Each setback has a gradual, near-vertical slope, creating what architecture writer Robert A. M. Stern described as a "prismatic" appearance. The building rises to an asymmetrical pinnacle, which is made of glass and was designed to illuminate at night.

750 Seventh Avenue has a Leadership in Energy and Environmental Design (LEED) Silver green building certification. According to the New York City Department of City Planning, the building has 561,139 square feet (52,131.5 m^{2}) of Gross Floor Area. The U.S. Green Building Council gives a different floor area of 620,641 square feet (57,659.4 m^{2}). The building has a two-story lobby with gray and white-granite walls and floors. The ceiling is reflective, giving the impression that the lobby is taller than it actually was.

== History ==
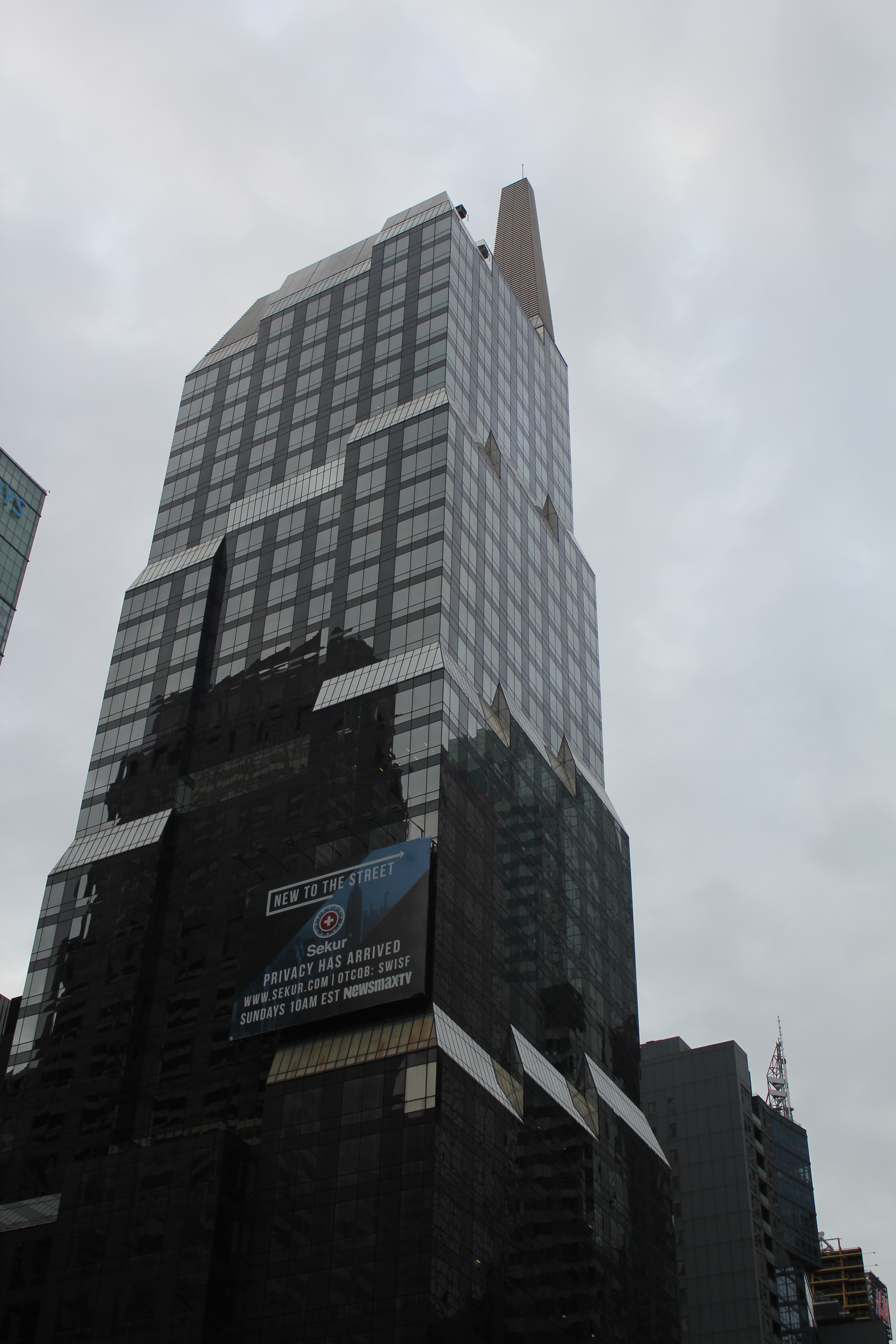
The building as seen from Broadway

Times Square's Theater District had evolved into a business district after World War II. Nonetheless, there were relatively few large developments there in the mid-20th century. Between 1958 and 1983, only twelve buildings with at least 100,000 square feet (9,300 m^{2}) of space were developed in the 114-block area between Sixth Avenue, Times Square, Eighth Avenue, and Columbus Circle. 750 Seventh Avenue was proposed in the 1980s, when there was high demand for office space in New York City. Husband-and-wife team David and Jean Solomon had become involved in acquiring and residential structures in Manhattan during the late 1970s, moving on to office buildings in the following decade. The Solomons decided to develop two structures on Times Square's northern periphery in the late 1980s: 750 Seventh Avenue and 1585 Broadway. Both of these structures were developed speculatively without a commitment from a specific tenant.

=== Development ===
By 1986, the Solomons were planning a 29-story tower on the Rivoli Theatre's site, one of several developments planned for Times Square. The structure would have 400,000 ft^{2} (37,000 m^{2}) or 500,000 ft^{2} (46,000 m^{2}) of office space. At the time, office buildings could be at least four times as profitable as a movie theater displaying a hit film on the same site. The Solomons had acquired much of the city block between Broadway, Seventh Avenue, and 49th and 50th Streets by mid-1987. The sole holdout was Stratford Wallace, owner of a 50 by 50 ft (15 by 15 m) site at Broadway and 50th Street, who said "All the money in circulation plus one dollar wouldn't have been enough" for the Solomons to buy his three-story building. The Solomons never acquired his building, which remained there even after 750 Seventh Avenue was built. UA demolished the Rivoli the same year and initially planned to build a multiplex on the site, within the new office building. Concurrently, the New York City Planning Commission (CPC) was considering enacting regulations that would have forced new buildings along Times Square's northern section to include bright signage. David Solomon opposed these regulations on the basis that they were to be indiscriminate, "without thought of how to apply them to those new buildings architecturally".

The CPC approved a planning regulation in September 1987, which required large new developments in Times Square to set aside about 5 percent of their space for "entertainment uses", such as broadcast studios or ground-floor stores. The ordinance also required the developers of such buildings to install large signs facing Times Square. In March 1988, UA president Stewart Blair confirmed that the company had sold its ownership stake in the site to David Solomon. According to Blair, a theater on the site was infeasible because of the presence of the subway line nearby. By that July, the office building's foundation had been constructed. Kevin Roche had modified the planned building, which was to contain 35 stories and 585,000 ft^{2} (54,300 m^{2}).

The aftermath of Black Monday had resulted in the New York City office market dropping sharply, but the office market was recovering by 1988. Several law firms were leasing office space around Times Square at the time, and developers such as Solomon Equities were offering large incentives for these companies. However, they had not been able to find a single tenant for 750 Seventh Avenue by late 1988. The next year, Solomon Equities unsuccessfully attempted to convince the Chemical Bank to lease space at either 1585 Broadway or 750 Seventh Avenue. The News Corporation also considered leasing the rest of 1585 Broadway, along with space in 750 Seventh Avenue. David Solomon severed negotiations in mid-1989 because he felt that News Corp would not pay enough rent. News Corp ultimately canceled the negotiations altogether the next year, amid steep increases in interest rates. Solomon Equities hired Lois Pitts to market its new Times Square buildings. The Solomons had originally hired William A. White/Grubb & Ellis as the brokers, but the couple subsequently hired Cushman & Wakefield as the new brokers in January 1990.

=== Completion and insolvency ===
The building was substantially completed in 1989 at an estimated cost of $150 million. This coincided with the beginning of the early 1990s recession, when 14.5 percent of Manhattan office space was vacant. Furthermore, some 9 million square feet (840,000 m^{2}) of office space in the western section of Midtown had been developed in the 1980s, of which only half had been leased. The Solomons' other project, 1585 Broadway, was similarly unsuccessful with just one tenant. In April 1990, the Solomons signed their first tenant at 750 Seventh Avenue: the law firm Olwine, Connelly, Chase, O'Donnell & Wehyer, which signed a 20-year lease for ten floors. Besides that, their Times Square skyscrapers, as well as a third project at 712 Fifth Avenue, were almost nearly empty. Since 750 Seventh Avenue was less than half occupied, the Solomons were not required to operate the exterior signs. As part of the Industrial and Commercial Incentive Program, which automatically distributed tax abatements to developers of industrial or commercial buildings in certain areas of New York City, the building also received a municipal tax abatement that lowered its tax bill by several million dollars.

Some work was still progressing in July 1990, a month after Olwine Connelly was supposed to move in. The Solomons could not sign any other tenants for the building, despite offering six months of free rent and a budget of $50/ft^{2} ($540/m^{2}) on improvements. Citicorp and the Bank of Nova Scotia had loaned $212.5 million to the Solomons for the building's construction, a cost of $372.80/ft^{2} ($4,012.8/m^{2}). Olwine Connelly ultimately moved into six floors at 750 Seventh Avenue, with a rental rate of either $4 million or $5 million a year. The firm faced several issues of its own, including increasing rent rates at 750 Seventh Avenue, as well as the fact that 40 of its 110 employees had departed between January and October 1991. Olwine Connelly disbanded altogether that November, leaving the building entirely vacant; the firm had never made a single rent payment. By the end of 1991, Citicorp was looking to restructure its loan to the Solomons.

In January 1992, Solomon Equities filed a Chapter 11 bankruptcy petition for 750 Seventh Avenue, a month after it had filed a similar action for 1585 Broadway. The Wall Street Journal reported that Citicorp had endorsed the filing in order to restructure its $187.5 million mortgage on the building. The European American Bank and the Commercial Bank of Kuwait had also provided unsecured loans for the building. Citicorp and several other banks took over the building. A Spanish bank offered to pay Citicorp $83 million for 750 Seventh Avenue in 1992 but the deal failed after Citicorp stalled. Law firm Mendes & Mount leased Olwine Connelly's former space in June 1992 and moved there that year. Shortly afterward, EAB agreed to settle its $35 million loan on 750 Seventh Avenue for three percent of its face value.

=== Occupancy and sales ===
==== 1990s ====
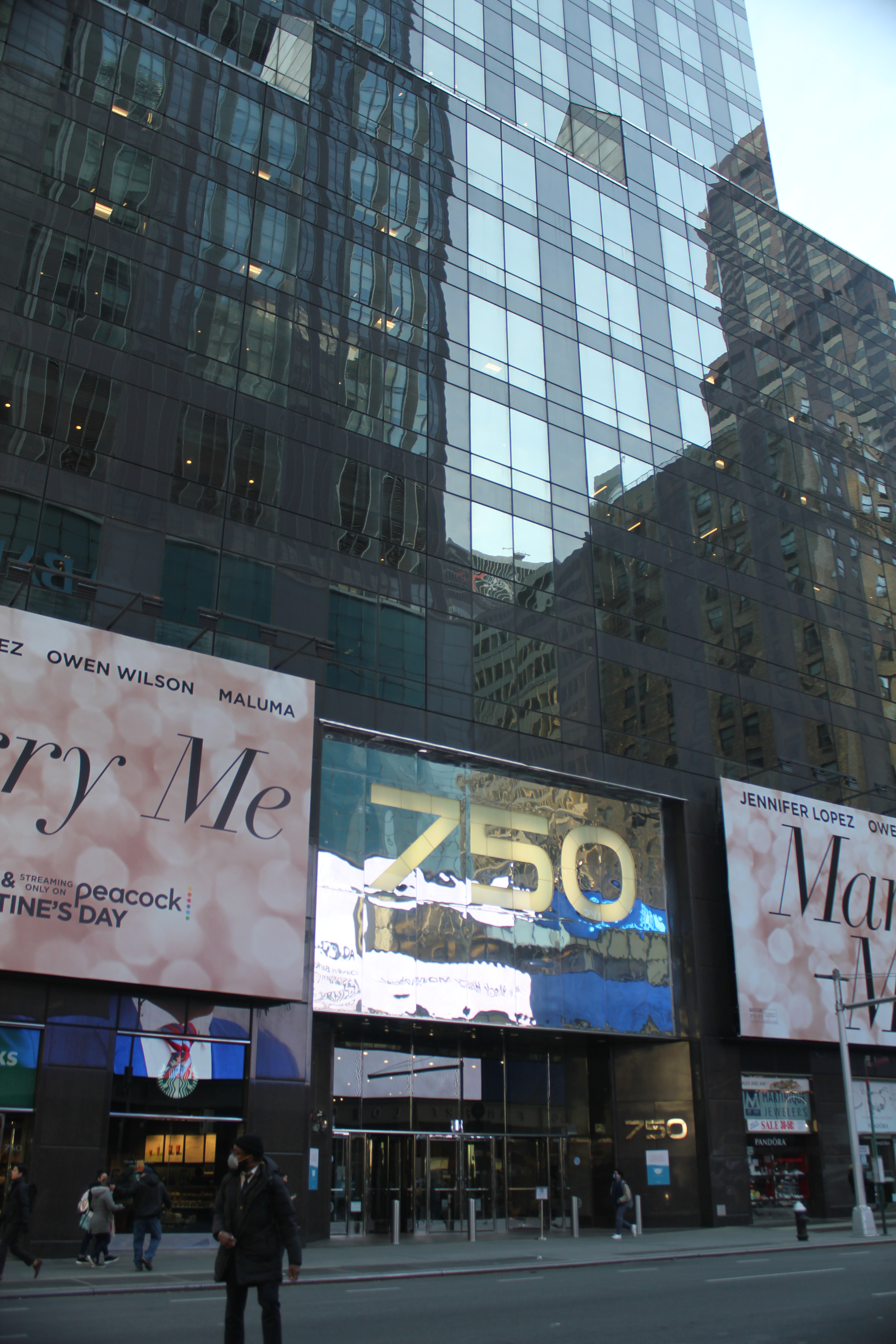
Entrance on Seventh Avenue

By early 1993, the building was no longer in bankruptcy, and its broker, Newmark Real Estate, was looking for tenants. The banks that owned the building had to decide whether to charge cheaper rents immediately or charge higher rents in several months. The banks decided to charge a variety of rents, with higher rates on higher floors. Newmark furnished some "prebuilt" office space for tenants needing small space, which it advertised to tenants at the nearby Rockefeller Center. The tactic drew tenants such as a regional office for accounting firm Ernst & Young, which took 42,000 ft^{2} (3,900 m^{2}). Meanwhile, Morgan Stanley had acquired 1585 Broadway in 1993, but the firm still needed around 250,000 ft^{2} (23,000 m^{2}). The Hong Kong firm Glorious Sun was considered purchasing 750 Seventh Avenue at the time, but the firm ultimately decided to let Morgan Stanley buy it instead.

Morgan Stanley bought 750 Seventh Avenue in 1994 for $90 million. (Note: The Wall Street Journal did not name 750 Seventh Avenue explicitly but said that the building was on Seventh Avenue and 49th Street and was developed by the Solomons. The newspaper also gives a conflicting figure of 200,000 ft^{2} (19,000 m^{2}) for Morgan Stanley's space requirements. Crain's New York mentioned both structures by name in 1995.) The firm installed signs on the facade to comply with the city regulations. The company had received a $100 million tax exemption after it purchased 1585 Broadway and 750 Seventh Avenue. Morgan Stanley moved its entire technology division, with a thousand employees, into 750 Seventh Avenue from September 1994 to June 1995. The firm still needed additional space, prompting it to begin developing 745 Seventh Avenue nearby. Morgan Stanley acquired Dean Witter Financial Services in 1997, and 750 Seventh Avenue became part of Morgan Stanley Dean Witter's "midtown urban campus".

==== 2000s to present ====
In January 2000, Morgan Stanley decided to sell the building for $150 million to Hines Interests Limited Partnership, in collaboration with General Motors Pension Trust. This was 67 percent more than what Morgan Stanley had paid six years earlier, but real estate experts believed the building was worth up to $175 million, nearly double the original purchase price. A Ruby Foo's restaurant also opened within the ground floor in 2000, replacing a comedy-themed restaurant that had been there for four years. After the sale, Morgan Stanley continued to lease back its space at 750 Seventh Avenue.

Following the September 11 attacks in 2001, Morgan Stanley dispersed employees from its Times Square "campus" to reduce the risk created by concentrating so many workers in a small area. Morgan Stanley sold the nearby 745 Seventh Avenue and subleased office space elsewhere in the city before purchasing the former Texaco Headquarters in White Plains in an effort to disperse its operations. By 2004, the firm was unsure if it would extend its lease for 426,000 ft^{2} (39,600 m^{2}) in the building, as the company had hired relatively few workers after the attacks, but it ultimately decided to renew the lease. Through the mid-2000s, Morgan Stanley retained 400,000 ft^{2} (37,000 m^{2}) of space at 750 Seventh Avenue, and Ernst & Young and Mendes & Mount kept their spaces there as well. Law firm Steptoe & Johnson also had some space across three floors at 750 Seventh Avenue until 2011.

Hines placed the building for sale in March 2011 and received thirty bids for the building. Kuwaiti firm Fosterlane Management agreed that May to purchase the building for $485 million. Afterward, Fosterlane attempted to evict Ruby Foo's, which prompted the restaurant to sue. Ruby Foo's ultimately stayed until 2015 and was replaced by a Junior's restaurant the next year. Law firm Holwell Shuster & Goldberg also subleased three floors in the building in 2015, and Shinhan Bank leased space there in 2022.

== Reception ==
Upon the completion of 750 Seventh Avenue in 1990, New York Times architectural critic Paul Goldberger called the structure "an agreeably quirky building" and compared its spire to a modern smokestack. David Masello of The Washington Post made a similar comparison in 1992, saying the pinnacle "looks to be a huge industrial smokestack". Conversely, Eve M. Kahn of The Wall Street Journal described 750 Seventh Avenue as a "harsh black-glass pyramid with jagged projections spiraling down its body", noting that it stood dark at night due to the lack of signage. According to Kahn, "poor 750 Seventh Avenue falls utterly dark at sundown, although a string of lights was supposed to pulsate down its spiraling projections". Carter Wiseman of New York said that Roche's "high-rise attempt at Seventh Avenue funk" was atypical of his usual designs, such as the Ford Foundation Building or United Nations Plaza (including the UN Plaza Hotel).

The 2010 version of the AIA Guide to New York City described the spire as a "finial finger", while Wiseman likened the spire to a finger making a "rude hand gesture". When the building was placed for sale in 2011, Laura Kusisto wrote for The New York Observer that the building had "an uncanny resemblance to the neighboring Death Star", with the glass spire being among its "dubious architectural features".

== See also ==
- List of tallest buildings in New York City
