= Texaco Headquarters =

Coordinates: 41.016750°N 73.711167°W

- Interactive map of the Texaco Headquarters area

General information
- Location: Purchase, New York, 2000 Westchester Avenue
- Opened: 1977

Design and construction
- Architect: J. Walter Severinghaus
- Architecture firm: Skidmore, Owings & Merrill

Texaco Headquarters is a corporate campus in Purchase, New York. When it opened in 1977, the building became the new head office of Texaco, which had been based in the Chrysler Building in Manhattan since 1930. Design was undertaken by Skidmore, Owings & Merrill, who assigned the project to J. Walter Severinghaus. After Chevron acquired Texaco in October 2001, the building was purchased by Morgan Stanley in March 2002.

== History ==
On Wednesday, July 18, 1973, Texaco announced that it had acquired an option to purchase a 107-acre property in Westchester County on which it proposed to construct a new office building. At this time, the company stated that half its employees would move to the new facility, though the executives would remain in the Chrysler Building. During the 1960s, several other large corporations had moved their offices to suburban campuses in Westchester Country, including IBM, General Foods, Pepsico, Flintkote, and American Machine and Foundry. Texaco's property included two parcels. One was owned by IBM and was zoned "campus office." The other was owned by James S. Wallerstein and his sister Elizabeth Shappert and was zoned residential. In March 1974, Texaco exercised its option and bought the land. The estimated purchase price was $10 million. At the time of the acquisition, the company also announced that the architecture firm Skidmore, Owning & Merrill and building firm Tishman Realty and Construction had been contracted. The property was bounded on the west and north by the Hutchinson River Parkway and on the south by the Cross Westchester Expressway. Over the next couple years, Texaco worked with the town to have the residential parcel rezoned. The change faced considerable local opposition. John A. Passidomo, the Town Supervisor, said, "we had to change our whole basic government structure to bring Texaco to Harrison."

Architects SOM assigned partner J. Walter Severinghaus (1905–1987) to lead the project. Severinghaus's design is based on a 30-foot square grid. The rectangular building is 29 bays long (or 870 feet) and 10 bays wide (or 300 feet). The length-wise wings are two bays wide, while the two end wings are three bays wide. The inside of the rectangle is divided by two crosswalks into three courtyards. Also in the inner section, the first and second floors are terraced at 30 feet each, with the terrace decks serving as gardens. The architect aligned the building along the east–west axis to minimize western sunlight exposure in the afternoon. Offices are set back nine feet from the perimeter of the building, and this shield from sunlight allows for floor-to-ceiling windows. The building is clad in travertine. When completed, the building had a total of 1,156,000 square feet of space with 750,000 square feet of interior offices. The building accommodated 2,100 workers and the two-floor underground garage held 1,500 cars. Texaco began its move in August 1977.

On October 9, 2001, Chevron acquired Texaco, and the White Plains building became redundant. In March 2002, Morgan Stanley acquired the building from Chevron for $42 million. At the time of the September 11 attacks, Morgan Stanley was a major tenant in the World Trade Center, had additional offices in 750 Seventh Avenue and 1585 Broadway, and was building 745 Seventh Avenue. The attacks raised major strategic concerns for the company, as it had its trading and backup offices within a single block in Manhattan. As part of a new policy of decentralization, Morgan Stanley sold 745 Seventh to Lehman Brothers and purchased the Texaco Headquarters. Subsequently, the company spent $227 million to upgrade the Texaco facilities as a data and backup trading center.
