= Punch & Judy Theatre =

Theater in New York City (1914–1987)

Coordinates: 40.7602°N 73.9826°W

The Punch & Judy Theatre, later known as Charles Hopkins Theatre, was a Broadway theatre located 153 W. 49th St. just east of 7th Avenue. It opened in 1914. It was converted into a movie theater in 1933, and was renamed Westminster Cinema in 1934. It became World Theatre in 1935 and initially showed foreign-language films under that name. It diversified into a mix of Hollywood film and international film offerings before becoming a venue for pornographic films in the 1960s and 1970s. When it was revealed to the public in 1982 that the pornographic cinema was owned by the Rockefeller Group, the public scandal led the organization to cease showing sexually explicit content and the theater was re-named Embassy 49th Street Theatre. It was demolished in 1987.

== History ==
Punch & Judy Theatre was designed by the Murphy & Dana architecture firm, and built at the behest of the owner, the actor and producer Charles Hopkins. It sat just 299 people but had a standard sized stage of a larger Broadway theatre that was 31 feet deep and forty feet wide. It opened on November 10, 1914 with Harold Chapin's The Marriage of Columbine. In 1925 it was re-named the Charles Hopkins Theatre.

With the financial pressures of the Great Depression, the theatre began showing films in 1933. It was re-named Westminster Cinema in 1934. In 1935 it was rebranded as the World Theatre (WT) when it became a cinema featuring foreign-language films from Italy and France. It was owned by the Rockefeller Group (RG), and eventually showed a mix of foreign language and Hollywood films. It remained a cinema for decades, and in the 1960s began showing films featuring softcore pornography. It screened the premiere of Deep Throat in 1972 and showed pornographic theatre in the 1970s.

In 1982 it became public knowledge that the RG owned the WT. Public backlash against the RG for running a pornographic theatre led the organization to cease showing sexually explicit cinema. The theatre was quickly rebranded the Embassy 49th Street Theatre, and re-opened with a family-friendly film made by The Walt Disney Company. It closed a few years later, and was demolished in 1987.
