= 1585 Broadway =

Office skyscraper in Manhattan, New York

- Morgan Stanley Building
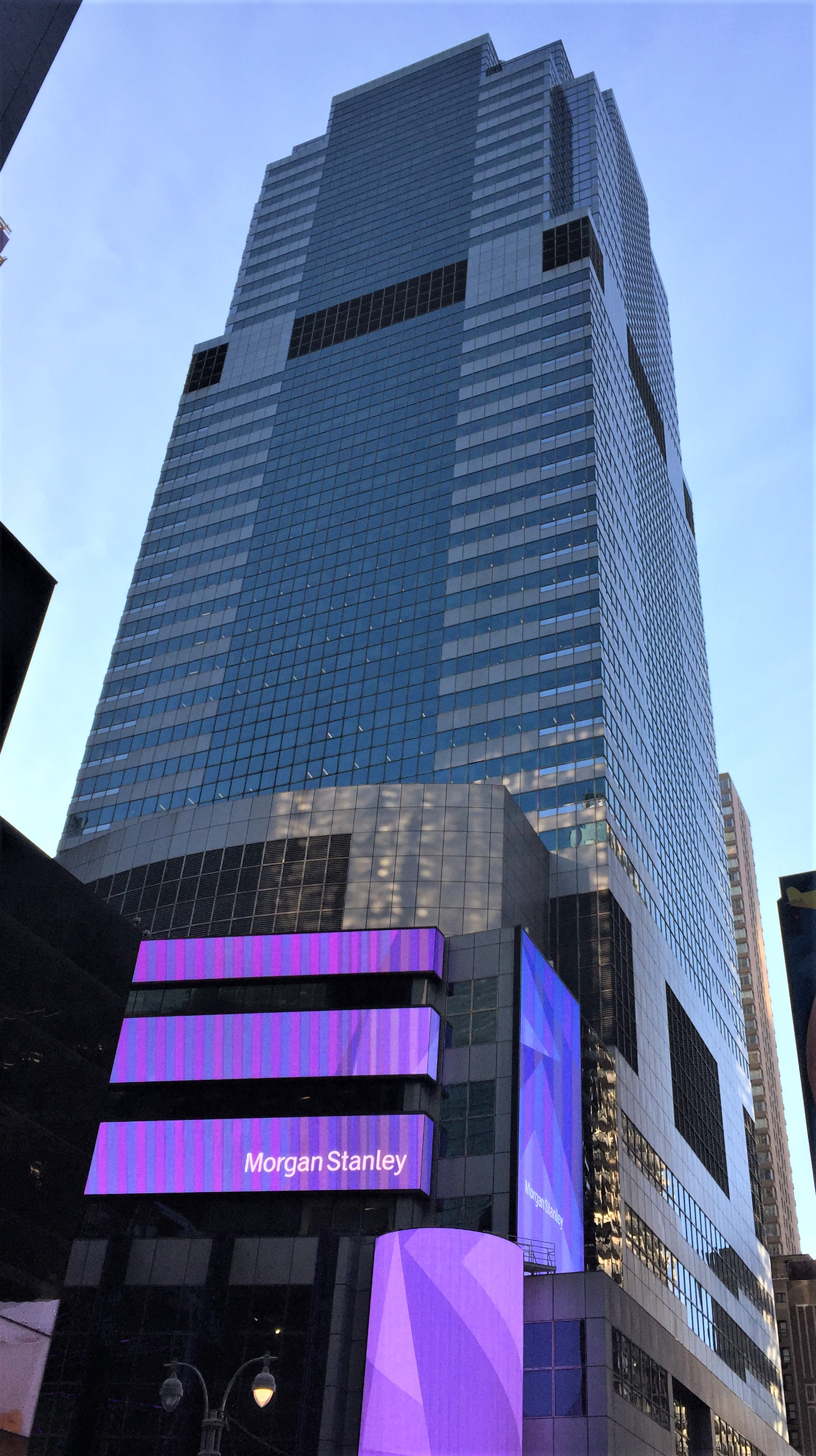
- Interactive map of the 1585 Broadway area

General information
- Type: Office
- Location: 1585 Broadway; Manhattan, New York, U.S.
- Coordinates: 40°45′36″N 73°59′08″W
- Current tenants: Morgan Stanley
- Construction started: 1989
- Completed: 1990
- Owner: Morgan Stanley

Height
- Roof: 685 ft (209 m)

Technical details
- Floor count: 42
- Floor area: 1,336,576 ft^{2} (124,172.0 m^{2})

Design and construction
- Architects: Emery Roth & Sons, Gwathmey Siegel & Associates Architects
- Developer: Solomon Equities Inc.
- Structural engineer: WSP Cantor Seinuk
- Main contractor: Starrett Brothers and Eken

1585 Broadway, also called the Morgan Stanley Building, is a 42-story office building on Times Square in the Theater District neighborhood of Manhattan in New York City, New York, U.S. The building was designed by Gwathmey Siegel & Associates Architects and Emery Roth & Sons and was developed by David and Jean Solomon. 1585 Broadway occupies a site on the west side of Broadway between 47th and 48th Streets. The building has served as the headquarters of financial-services company Morgan Stanley since 1995.

1585 Broadway consists of a low base, with setbacks that recede into a tower section measuring 685 ft (209 m) tall. The facade is designed with large signs at the base. The upper stories contain a facade of glass with aluminum spandrels, as well as a glass gable roof. At the ground level, the entire Broadway side contains stores, and the main entrances are placed on 47th and 48th Streets. The office entrances are connected by a wide lobby, which also connects to a basement cafeteria. Morgan Stanley's offices occupy the upper floors, with an executive suite at the 40th and 41st stories. The interior was designed by Gwathmey Siegel and Gensler.

Solomon Equities had developed 1585 Broadway as a speculative development in 1989, on the site of the Strand Theatre and another building. Morgan Stanley had expressed interest in the space during construction but ultimately decided against it. When 1585 Broadway was completed in 1990, law firm Proskauer Rose was the only tenant, occupying eleven floors. The Solomons unsuccessfully attempted to attract more tenants and fell into debt, forcing the building into foreclosure in December 1991. The building was taken over by a consortium of banks who sold it to Morgan Stanley in 1993. Morgan Stanley moved into the building after several renovations. Proskauer Rose renovated its own space in 2000 and continued to occupy part of the building until 2010. Afterward, Morgan Stanley expanded into the former Proskauer Rose space and renovated each floor in the mid-2010s.

== Site ==
1585 Broadway is on the western side of Broadway, between 47th Street to the south and 48th Street to the north. It is at the northwest corner of Times Square in the Theater District of Midtown Manhattan in New York City, New York, U.S. The trapezoidal land lot covers 50,657 ft^{2} (4,706.2 m^{2}), with a frontage of 206 ft (63 m) on 47th Street and a depth of 277.87 ft (84.69 m). The southeastern end of the building faces Duffy Square.

The surrounding area is part of Manhattan's Theater District and contains many Broadway theatres. The Morgan Stanley Building shares the block with the Ethel Barrymore Theatre and Samuel J. Friedman Theatre on 47th Street and the Longacre Theatre on 48th Street. Across 48th Street are the Eugene O'Neill Theatre and Walter Kerr Theatre to the northwest and the Crowne Plaza Times Square Manhattan to the north. To the east across Times Square are 20 Times Square, TSX Broadway, the Palace and Embassy Theatres, and the I. Miller Building. In addition, the Hotel Edison and Lunt-Fontanne Theatre are to the south, and the Brooks Atkinson Theatre and Paramount Hotel are to the southwest. The site had contained two six-story buildings before 1986: the Strand Theatre, a movie house, as well as Leighton's Haberdashers and Clothiers, which had operated on Broadway for 67 years.

== Architecture ==
1585 Broadway was designed by Emery Roth & Sons and Gwathmey Siegel & Associates Architects and was Gwathmey Siegel's first high-rise design. It is 42 stories tall (Note: Some sources give the building's height as 41 stories. Robert A. M. Stern incorrectly cited the height as 52 stories.) and measures 685 ft (209 m) to its roof. Irwin G. Cantor of WSP Cantor Seinuk was the structural engineer, while the Tishman Construction Company was the general contractor. 1585 Broadway has a Leadership in Energy and Environmental Design (LEED) Gold green building certification. The building is also known as the Morgan Stanley Building for its anchor tenant, financial services company Morgan Stanley, which uses 1585 Broadway as a headquarters.

=== Form and facade ===
The building was proposed with a facade and a gable roof made of glass, as well as a square tower set back from the base. As built, the base occupies the entire site; it is aligned with Broadway, which runs diagonally to the Manhattan street grid. The base is designed with several setbacks that, according to Gwathmey Siegel, "responds to the pedestrian scale of the street in the theater district". Above ground level, there are two rectangular setbacks. There is a double-height mechanical space on the fourth and fifth floors, with an outward curve toward Broadway; this delineates the transition between the base and tower. The mechanical space's facade contains ventilation and heating grilles rather than windows. The tower section is aligned with 47th and 48th Streets, which run parallel to the street grid.

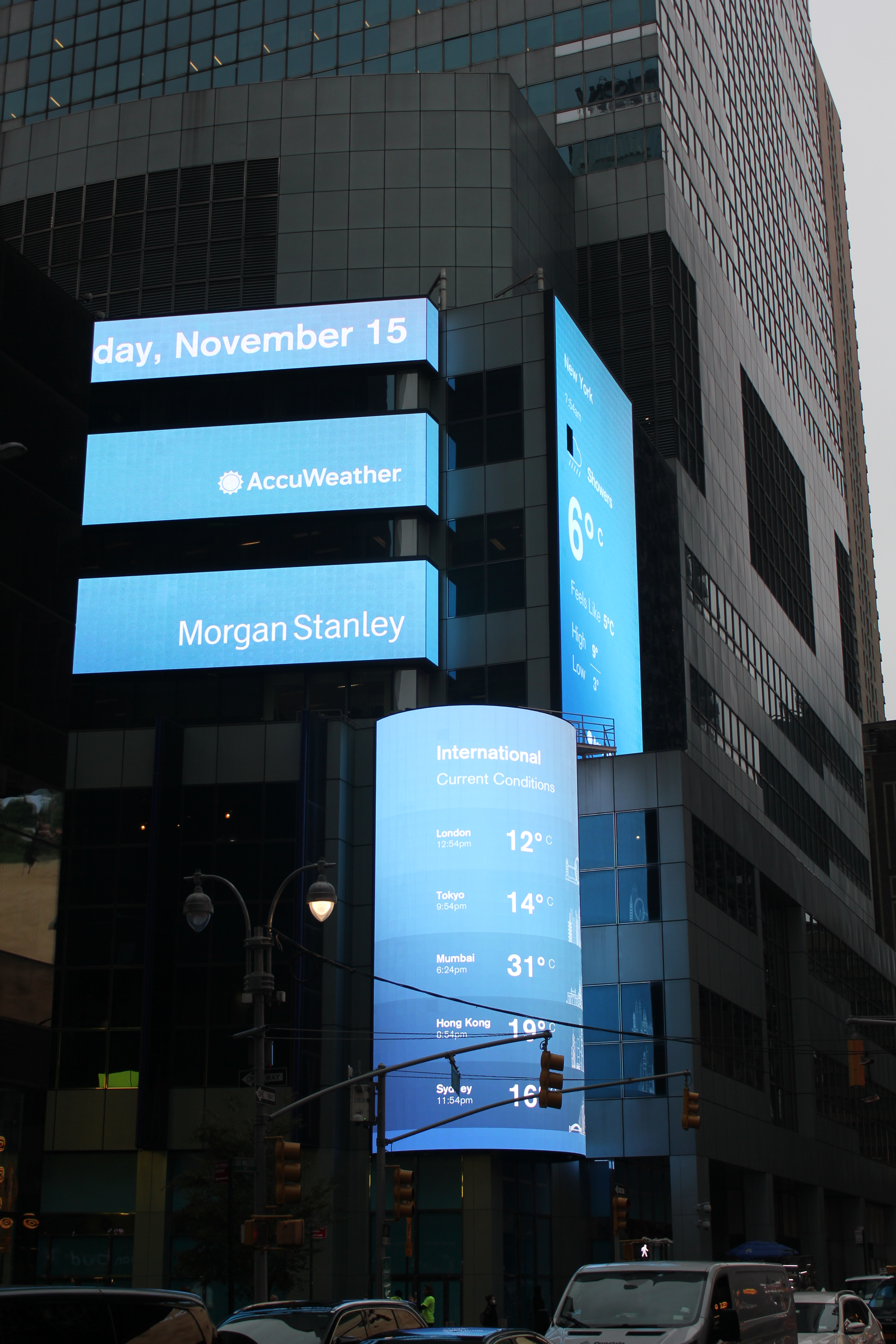
Weather display at the base

The base is covered in glass and metal, with dark-glass panels hiding the signage behind them. Artkraft Strauss Sign Corporation manufactured the signs on the base, which were included to comply with city regulations. Ten dark-glass "fins" protrude over the sidewalk on Broadway, each containing one of the characters "1585 B'way". Each storefront has signs identifying the retailer there. Three horizontal boards are placed above the fourth-story setback, displaying financial quotations and news. Each board is 140 ft (43 m) wide and 10 to 12 ft (3.0 to 3.7 m) high; the boards constitute a large ticker tape. Two additional signs at the corners, measuring 30 by 60 ft (9.1 by 18.3 m), display market information. At Broadway's corners with 47th and 48th Streets, there are curved signs measuring 44 ft (13 m) tall, which display the current time in cities around the world. Morgan Stanley's name is only displayed at the corners, with 7 in-high (18 cm) letters.

The tower's facade is mostly a glass curtain wall with facade panels designed by PPG. The tower section contains silver aluminum spandrel panels at the corners. On the upper stories, the corners are notched inward and contain mirrored-glass panels. The remainder of the facade is made of panels that are either white, blue-green, or mirrored glass. These panels are framed by nearly invisible mullions. The facade panels appear in different colors under different lighting conditions. According to a book about Gwathmey Siegel's architecture, these materials were meant to create "images of both opacity and reflectivity, creating a simultaneous sense of fluidity and permanence". The roof is pitched on four sides, a modification of a mansard roof design, but with four backlit panels. Architectural critic Paul Goldberger described the roof as a "cross between a gabled roof and a cut-off pyramid".

=== Features ===
The building has 1.3 million square feet (120,000 m^{2}) of gross floor area. Because of zoning rules, there is no office entrance on Broadway, as that frontage is taken up by shops. Gwathmey Siegel designed the original lobby in 1990 as well as the executive suite of Morgan Stanley in 1995. Gensler designed the remainder of the offices.

==== Lobby and basements ====
The lobby connects the entrances on 47th and 48th Streets. It is a privately owned public space measuring 100 by 60 ft (30 by 18 m). The lobby is part of a corridor of privately owned public spaces connecting 44th to 49th Streets. The other spaces on this corridor are Shubert Alley, a passageway under the New York Marriott Marquis, the lobby of the Hotel Edison, and a driveway under the Crowne Plaza Times Square Manhattan.

The lobby contains a marble floor with white, dark-green, and black tiles arranged in a geometric pattern. The walls are made of gray granite with dark green marble strips. One wall curves inward to give the impression that it is shorter than it actually is. The lobby ceiling is made of wood and is supported by two large columns. The ceiling is arranged in a grid, with rectangular coffers measuring 5 ft (1.5 m) wide. There are incandescent lamps with reflectors within the ceiling, creating what Architectural Lighting magazine described as a "luminous" effect. Stephen Margulies designed the lobby lighting.

Behind a glass wall, the lobby contains escalators to a 500-seat dining room in the basement. An overpass passes above the dining-room escalators. The dining room was built in 1995; it was originally storage space and was not connected to the lobby. The lobby and dining room collectively measure 29,000 ft^{2} (2,700 m^{2}). The sub-basement was originally used by law firm Proskauer Rose, whose chairman Alan S. Jaffe euphemistically referred to the space as a "concourse". Part of the sub-basement level became a law library in 2000; the space had 60,000 volumes and was staffed by 14 librarians, with capacity for 34 lawyers. The sub-basement also had locker rooms for the law firm's male and female employees. There are full-height frosted-glass panels, wooden decorations, and indirect lighting fixtures from the walls and ceiling. The space contains three concrete columns measuring 4 by 4 ft (1.2 by 1.2 m), which are covered with stainless-steel panels.

==== Executive suite ====
Morgan Stanley's executive suite is on the 40th and 41st stories of the tower and covers 45,000 ft^{2} (4,200 m^{2}). It contains offices, dining rooms, meeting spaces, and boardrooms. The foyer to the executive suite contains windows facing in three directions, while the offices can accommodate 30 executives. The suite is clad in granite and three types of wood; architect Charles Gwathmey said this arose from Morgan Stanley's desire for "real materials". Anigre is used for the foyer's walls. Mahogany is used for the steps of the double-width staircase connecting the two floors, as well as for ceiling grids, similar to those in the lobby. Ebonized cherry wood is used for doors and other fixtures. The executive suite also contains a 35 ft-long (11 m) boardroom table, as well as various pieces of modern furniture. Some of the furniture is inspired by those at Frank Lloyd Wright's Coonley House.

== History ==
Times Square's Theater District had evolved into a business district after World War II. Nonetheless, there were relatively few large developments there in the mid-20th century. Between 1958 and 1983, only twelve buildings with at least 100,000 ft^{2} (9,300 m^{2}) of space were developed in the 114-block area between Sixth Avenue, Times Square, Eighth Avenue, and Columbus Circle. 1585 Broadway was proposed in the 1980s, when there was high demand for office space in New York City. Husband-and-wife team David and Jean Solomon had become involved in acquiring and residential structures in Manhattan during the late 1970s, moving on to office buildings in the following decade. The Solomons decided to develop two structures on Times Square's northern periphery in the late 1980s: 750 Seventh Avenue and 1585 Broadway. Both of these structures were developed speculatively without a commitment from a specific tenant.

=== Development ===
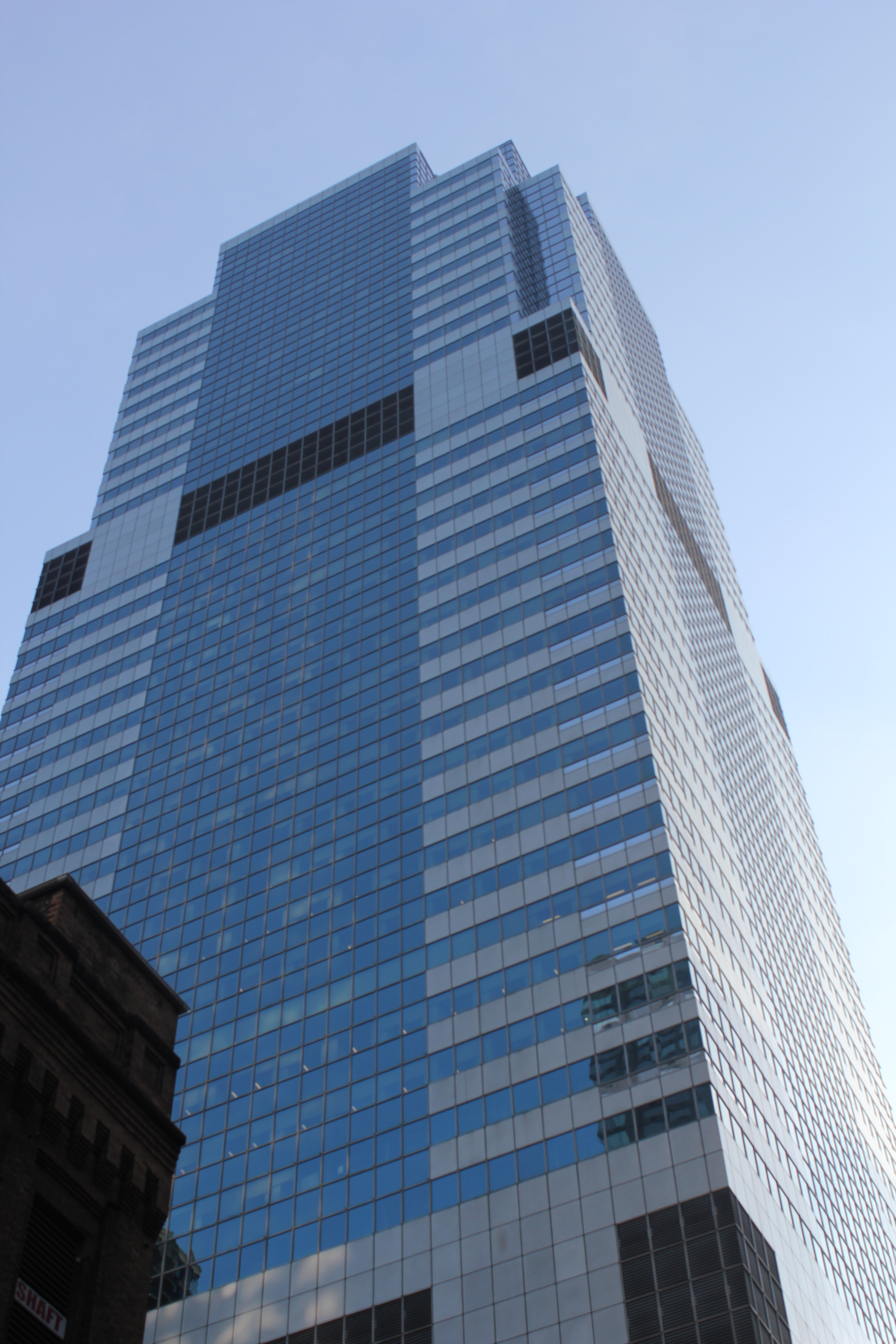
Seen from street level at 47th Street

The Solomons acquired the Strand Theatre and Leighton's Haberdashers and Clothiers in 1986, with plans to build a 40-story tower on the two sites. This was one of several developments planned for Times Square at that time. The New York City Planning Commission (CPC) was considering enacting regulations that would have forced new buildings along Times Square's northern section to include bright signage as well as deep setbacks. David Solomon opposed these regulations on the basis that they were to be indiscriminate, "without thought of how to apply them to those new buildings architecturally". Leighton's closed in December 1986 to make way for the tower. To attain additional floor area, Solomon Equities purchased the Barrymore Theatre's unused air development rights from the Shubert Organization. In total, the structure would have 1.2 million square feet (110,000 m^{2}).

Engineering consultant Irwin Cantor devised two plans for the building's superstructure: a tubular frame and a megastructure. By mid-1987, Morgan Stanley was negotiating with Solomon Equities for space in the proposed tower. Morgan Stanley executives did not like the prospect of seeing bright signage outside their windows, and the deal fell through for that reason. The Solomons decided to proceed with the tower anyway. The supply of office space in New York City was starting to outpace demand by then. Demolition of the site was underway by mid-1987. The CPC approved a planning regulation in September 1987, which required large new developments in Times Square to set aside about 5 percent of their space for "entertainment uses", such as broadcast studios or ground-floor stores. While 1585 Broadway was planned entirely as an office building, it had retail space on Broadway to comply with this rule. The ordinance also required the developers of such buildings to install large signs facing Times Square; the Solomons modified their plans as a result.

The aftermath of Black Monday had resulted in the New York City office market dropping sharply, but the office market was recovering by 1988. Law firm Proskauer Rose leased 426,000 ft^{2} (39,600 m^{2}) at 1585 Broadway that August, with officials citing cheaper rents and newer mechanical systems in their decision. Proskauer Rose was one of several law firms leasing office space around Times Square at the time, and developers such as Solomon Equities were offering large incentives for these companies. The next year, Solomon Equities unsuccessfully attempted to convince the Chemical Bank to lease space at either 1585 Broadway or 750 Seventh Avenue. The News Corporation also considered leasing the rest of 1585 Broadway, along with space in 750 Seventh Avenue. David Solomon severed negotiations in mid-1989 because he felt that News Corp would not pay enough rent. News Corp ultimately canceled the negotiations altogether the next year, amid steep increases in interest rates. Solomon Equities hired Lois Pitts to market its new Times Square buildings.

=== Completion and insolvency ===
==== Difficulties ====
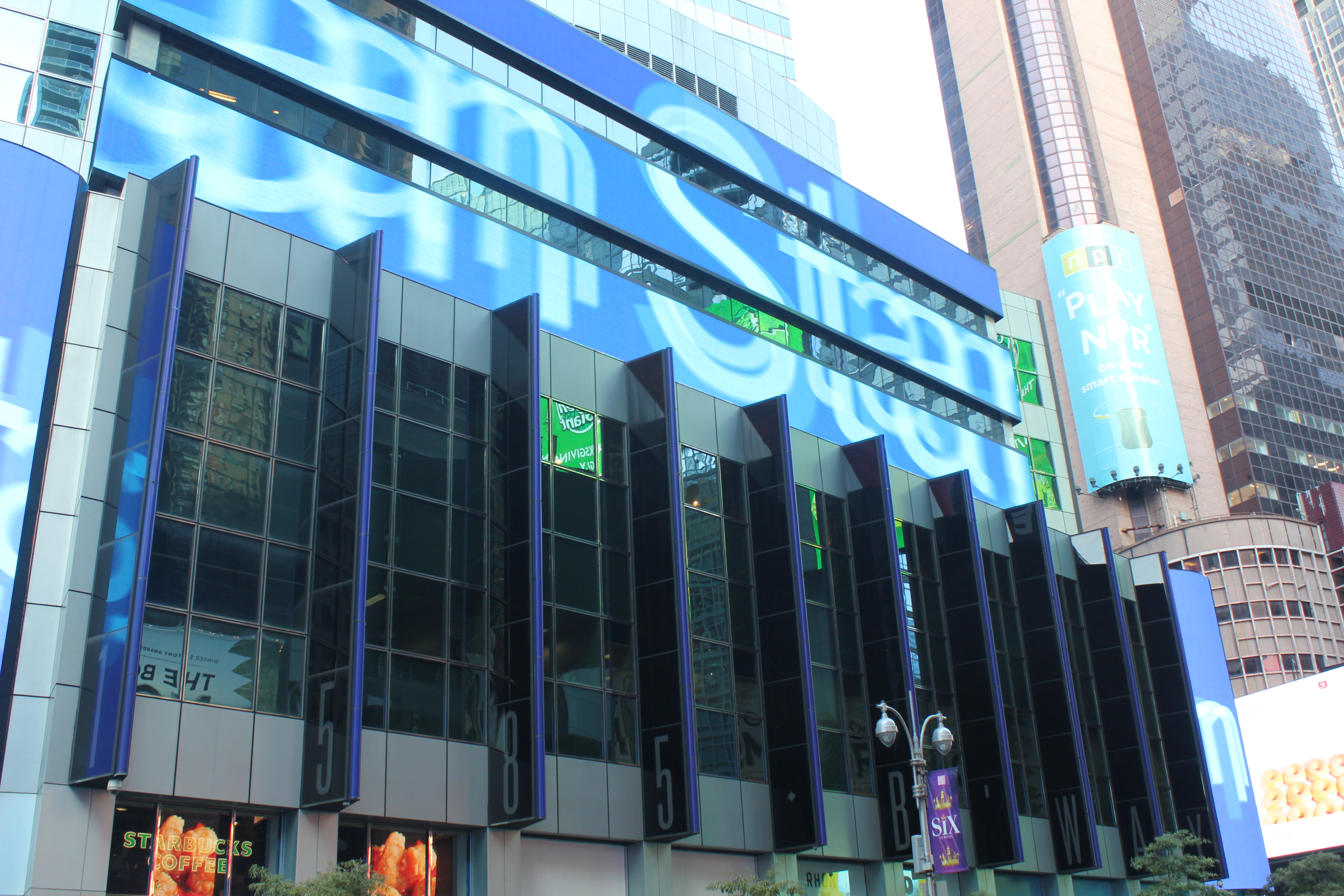
Signage at the base on Broadway

1585 Broadway was completed in 1990 for $300 million. This coincided with the beginning of the early 1990s recession, when 14.5 percent of Manhattan office space was vacant. Furthermore, some 9 million square feet (840,000 m^{2}) of office space in the western section of Midtown had been developed in the 1980s, of which only half had been leased. By March 1990, David and Jean Solomon had not been able to sign any other tenants besides Proskauer Rose for either of their Times Square buildings. (Note: The Solomons were able to sign a tenant for 750 Seventh Avenue in April 1990.) Their Times Square skyscrapers, as well as a third project at 712 Fifth Avenue, were almost nearly empty. Proskauer Rose occupied 11 of the 42 floors at 1585 Broadway, taking up 365,000 ft^{2} (33,900 m^{2}). The rest of the building, covering 944,400 ft^{2} (87,740 m^{2}), remained available for lease in mid-1990. Since the structure was less than half occupied, the Solomons were not required to operate the exterior signs. As part of the Industrial and Commercial Incentive Program, which automatically distributed tax abatements to developers of industrial or commercial buildings in certain areas of New York City, the building also received a municipal tax abatement that lowered its tax bill by several million dollars.

A consortium of Swiss Bank Corporation, Bank of Montreal, and Toronto-Dominion Bank had given a first mortgage of $320 million, and Swiss Bank also made a $50 million subordinated loan. Other debt included $40 million owed to the European American Bank (EAB) and $17.5 million owed to the Commercial Bank of Kuwait. The first difficulties with the building's finances arose in September 1990, when the Solomons neglected to pay $46.425 million to the three first-mortgage lenders. The Solomons subsequently missed an interest payment that December, and debts accumulated to the point where Consolidated Edison shut off the building's heat service in early 1991. The Solomons were in default by that February, but the lenders were unable to press their claims. EAB successfully sued the Solomons in June 1991 for failure to pay back the loan, and several of the building's construction contractors filed mechanics' liens against the property throughout mid-1991.

Furthermore, Proskauer Rose did not pay rent for two years because the Solomons had promised $25 million of improvements and provided a work letter that exempted the tenant from paying rent until October 1991. Proskauer Rose decided not to pay its $453,606 monthly rent even when it came due, citing the fact that the Solomons had not made improvements to the building. Among the issues were faulty elevators, an unfinished facade, non-functional mechanical systems, and the fact that the driveway was not staffed 24 hours a day. At one point, Proskauer Rose paid the electric bill at the last minute before 1585 Broadway's power supply was about to be shut off. The law firm was paying for the building's utilities, insurance premiums, and security guards from their own budget, then credited these costs against its rent charges. By December 1991, Bank of Montreal and Toronto-Dominion Bank were considering foreclosing on the building. The debt had increased to $340 million by then.

==== Chapter 11 filing ====
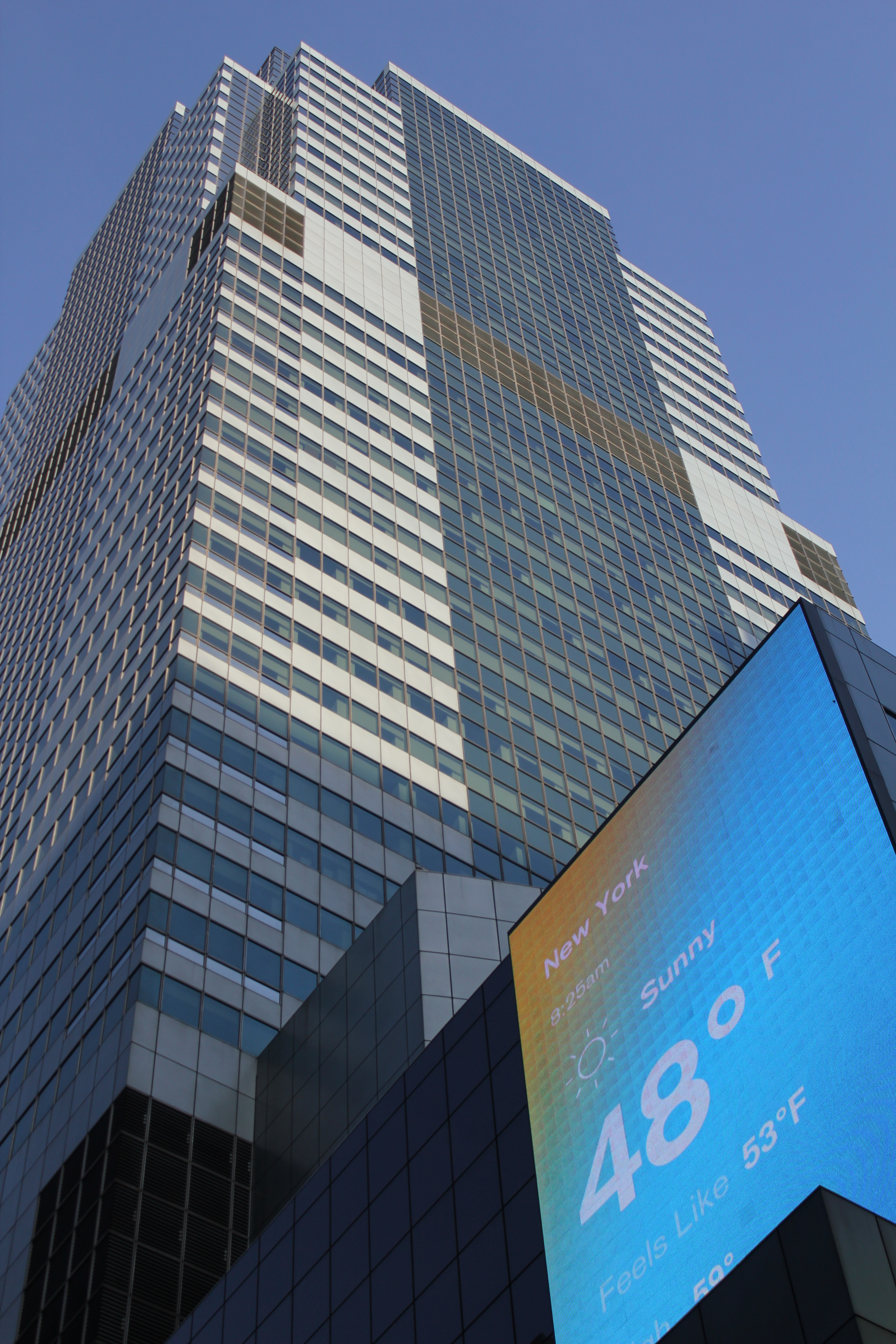
View from 47th Street and Broadway

At the end of December 1991, Solomon Equities filed a Chapter 11 bankruptcy petition for 1585 Broadway, having not signed a single tenant for the building in the previous three years. In that time, the building's only tenant, Proskauer Rose, had never paid rent. 1585 Broadway had $231 million in assets and $482 million in debt, and it was losing $1.9 million monthly. As a result of the Chapter 11 filing, the foreclosure proceedings on the building were placed on hold, and David Solomon was relieved of his duty to pay $3.4 million in property taxes. Proskauer Rose then sued the Solomons, as well as the eight banks that held the building's debt, for not having finished the building. The parties were forming a settlement by April 1992.

The lenders could not agree on the terms of the restructuring, and more than five prospective tenants were turned away as a result. The lenders had arranged to sell 1585 Broadway to Primerica Corporation, which would have relocated its stock brokerage division, Smith Barney, Harris Upham & Company, into the building. The deal collapsed when Primerica acquired another brokerage, Shearson, and began laying off Smith Barney workers, making the additional space unnecessary. In another case, the Internal Revenue Service was looking to lease a 240,000 ft^{2} (22,000 m^{2}) Midtown office, but 1585 Broadway's bankruptcy dissuaded the IRS from leasing there. The lenders' acrimonious negotiations also turned away financial-services company Mastercard, which was looking for a new Manhattan headquarters in late 1992 and had identified four buildings, including 1585 Broadway, as possible locations.

In 1993, the lenders hired Hines Interests Limited Partnership to manage the property. The bankruptcy courts approved a plan to reorganize 1585 Broadway in March 1993. The lenders began looking for a buyer for the entire building. Despite Solomon's negotiations with several potential small tenants, the lenders did not even want to show the building to anyone other than a large tenant. Furthermore, the lenders wanted $150 million for the property, which had to be sold before the building exited Chapter 11 bankruptcy protection in September 1993. This was much less than the $400 million debt on the building, but it was very high for any investor who was buying the structure speculatively. Among the potential bidders were the Reliance National Insurance Company, which was seeking 250,000 ft^{2} (23,000 m^{2}). Morgan Stanley, the Quantum Fund, Milstein Properties, and Odyssey Partners all made bids of least $150 million. All of the bids were sealed, so none of the competing bidders knew how much the others had paid.

=== Morgan Stanley takeover ===
==== 1990s ====
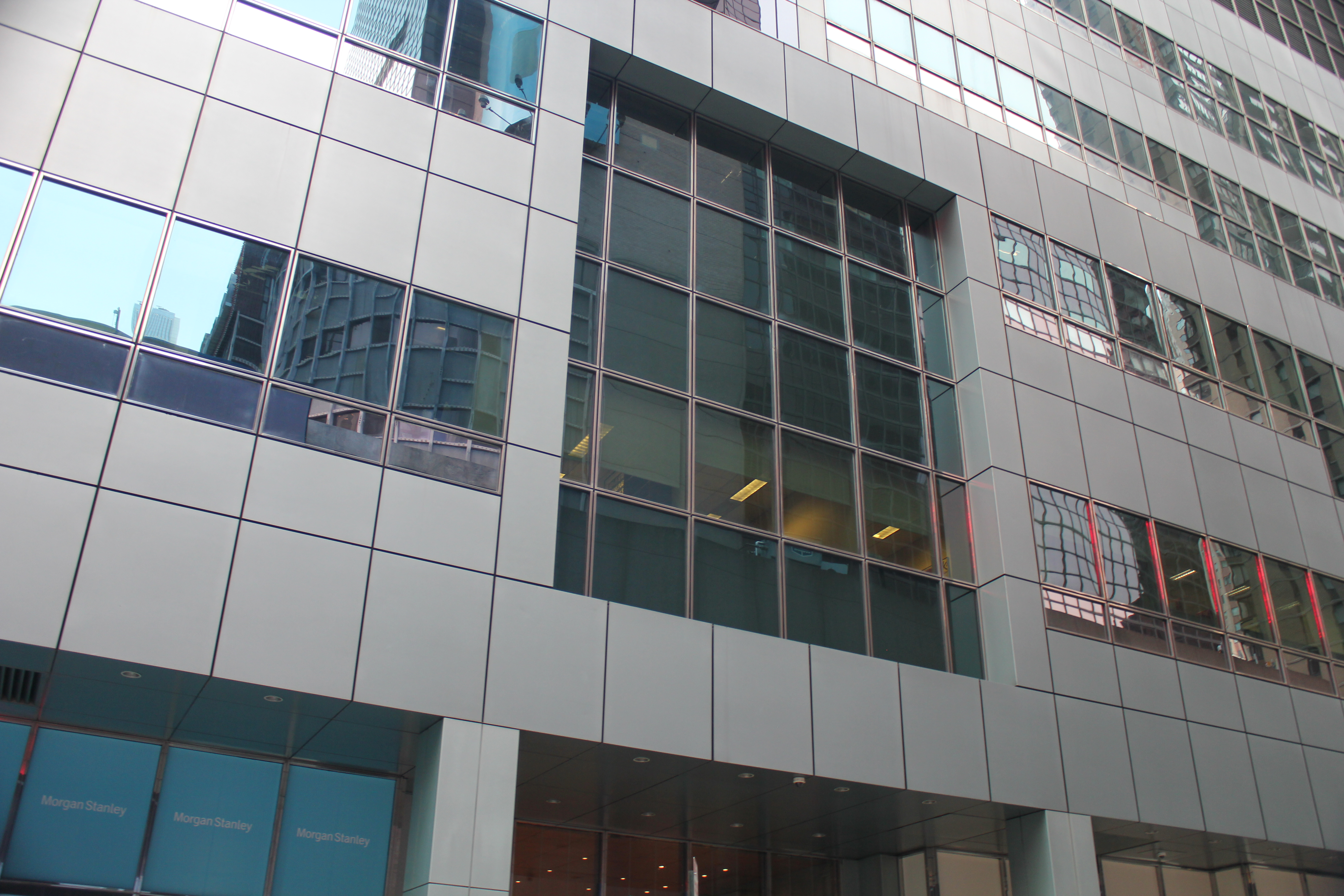
Windows at the building's base

The lenders sold 1585 Broadway to the high bidder, Morgan Stanley, for $176 million in August 1993. This was about half what the building would have cost if it were newly built. David Solomon said there was a "bittersweet irony" to the sale, as Morgan Stanley had negotiated for space when the building was first being developed. The company had 4,590 workers in Manhattan at the time, having added 400 positions in the past two years. Morgan Stanley had considered moving to Connecticut but had decided to stay in New York City after being offered $40 million in tax abatements. A spokesman for Cushman and Wakefield said Morgan Stanley's purchase "gave people confidence that the financial community is staying in New York". The deal continued a revival of Times Square, which had commenced with the previous year's acquisition of 1540 Broadway by entertainment conglomerate Bertelsmann. Morgan Stanley's purchase showed that Manhattan's financial center was moving beyond its traditional nexus on Wall Street and the Financial District, and it also signified that companies outside the entertainment industry could occupy office space in Times Square.

1585 Broadway already had some space that could be used as trading floors, and the building's electrical system could support the high power requirements of workstations. Morgan Stanley executives had also liked the building's column-free spaces. The firm planned to use the second through sixth floors for its commodities, equities, fixed income, and forex divisions. Even after the acquisition of 1585 Broadway, Morgan Stanley still needed around 250,000 ft^{2} (23,000 m^{2}). This prompted the firm to buy 750 Seventh Avenue in 1994 (Note: The Wall Street Journal did not name 750 Seventh Avenue explicitly but said that the building was on Seventh Avenue and 49th Street and was developed by the Solomons. The newspaper also gives a conflicting figure of 200,000 ft^{2} (19,000 m^{2}) for Morgan Stanley's space requirements. Crain's New York mentioned both structures by name in 1995.) and to begin developing 745 Seventh Avenue nearby. Morgan Stanley was still required to place signs on 1585 Broadway's facade once the building was more than 50 percent occupied. This time, Morgan Stanley executives saw the benefits of getting a deeply discounted space as outweighing the drawbacks of large signs. 1585 Broadway's original architect, Gwathmey Siegel, designed a renovation for the building in 1994 and conducted the renovation the next year. Signs were installed on the exterior; the basement dining room and the executive suite were added; and 2,000 trading desks were added across four stories. Morgan Stanley received a $100 million tax exemption after it purchased 1585 Broadway and 750 Seventh Avenue.

Morgan Stanley began moving into 1585 Broadway in mid-1995, relocating from 1251 Avenue of the Americas. Within a year, retail tenants began filling the ground-floor space, including Sunglass Hut and Starbucks. The building was also occupied by smaller tenants such as a charitable foundation administered by the estate of the late heiress Doris Duke. Proskauer Rose continued to take up space in 1585 Broadway, as its lease ran for twenty years. The law firm spent $4 million in 1996 to upgrade its technological equipment in 1585 Broadway. Though Proskauer Rose and Morgan Stanley were the building's only office tenants, they occupied the entire building. Morgan Stanley acquired Dean Witter Financial Services in 1997, and 1585 Broadway became part of Morgan Stanley Dean Witter's "midtown urban campus". The firm of Brennan Beer Gorman Monk designed an information booth for Morgan Stanley Dean Witter within one of 1585 Broadway's storefronts in 1998. The booth consisted of a cube suspended 8 ft (2.4 m) above ground, with 18 screens, as well as a ticker above the floor.

==== 2000s ====
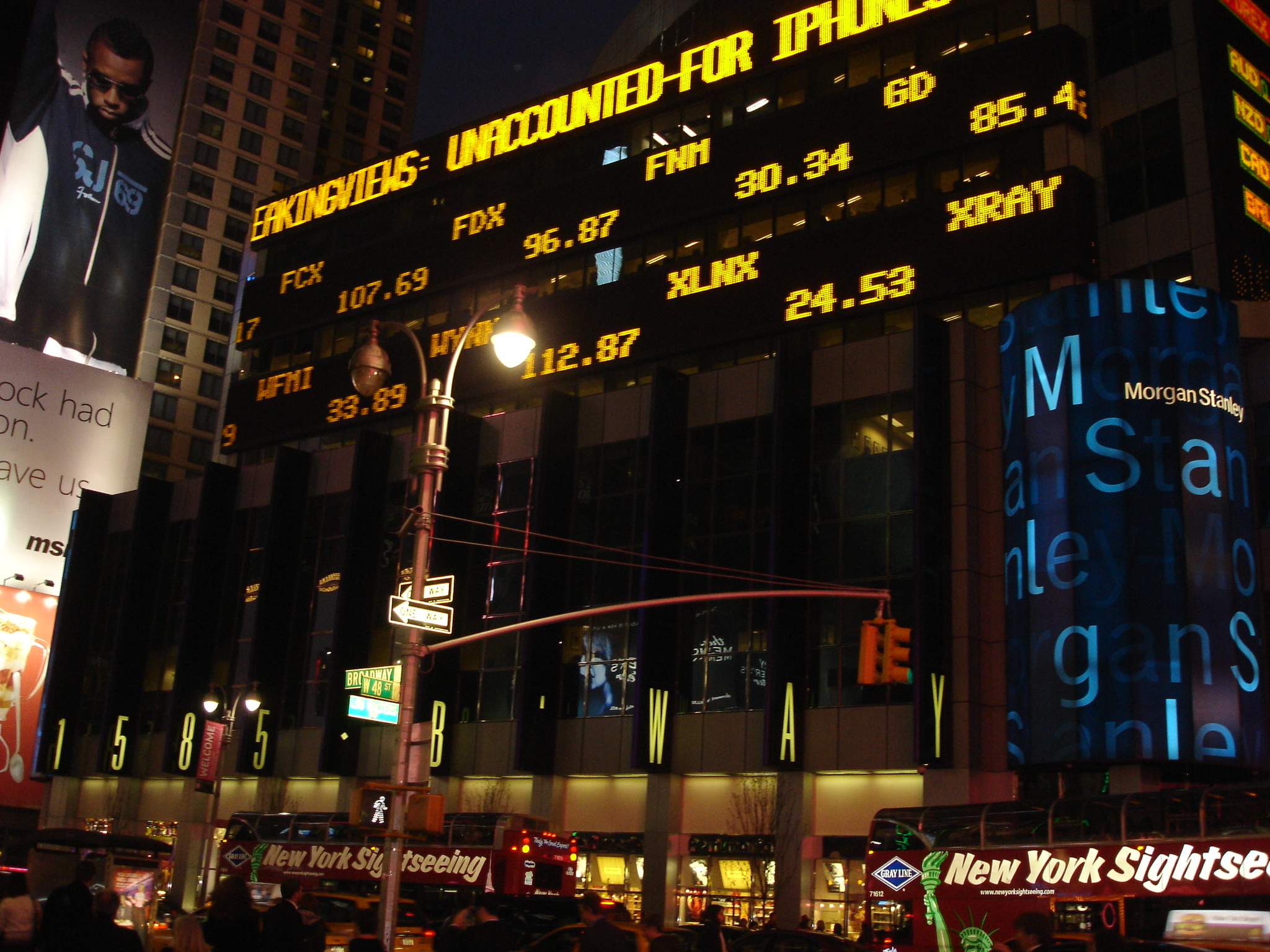
View at night, 2008

Proskauer Rose renovated the 19th floor in 2000, adding seven conference rooms and 49 offices by relocating its law library to the sub-basement. The law firm renovated the rest of its space shortly afterward. Following the September 11 attacks in 2001, Morgan Stanley dispersed employees from its Times Square "campus" to reduce the risk created by concentrating of so many workers in a small area. Morgan Stanley sold the nearby 745 Seventh Avenue and subleased office space elsewhere in the city before purchasing the former Texaco Headquarters in White Plains in an effort to disperse its operations. 1585 Broadway's lobby was also closed to the public for security reasons, despite being a privately owned public space that legally had to remain open.

To protect against vehicular attacks, Morgan Stanley installed planters outside 1585 Broadway in 2004. Morgan Stanley began turning off the building's lights at night in 2005 to reduce the risk of migratory birds crashing into the facade. The planters outside the building were removed in 2006; the New York City Police Department said that the barriers were ineffective at preventing vehicular attacks while also obstructing pedestrian flow. The same year, Morgan Stanley bought a building at 522 Fifth Avenue and relocated its private wealth management and investment management divisions there.

==== 2010s to present ====
When Proskauer Rose's lease at 1585 Broadway expired in 2010, the firm sought to relocate to the nearby 11 Times Square rather than renew its lease at 1585 Broadway. Morgan Stanley planned to move into the space Proskauer Rose had vacated. There had been tension between the two tenants, since Proskauer Rose had occupied a comparatively small amount of space in the building while Morgan Stanley had used the structure as its headquarters. The financial firm retained its banking and trading divisions in 1585 Broadway but occupied several other structures in the city. (Note: Including 1 New York Plaza, 85 Broad Street, 750 Seventh Avenue, and 1221 Avenue of the Americas) The ground-floor storefront space was leased by tenants such as Skagen and Fossil Group. Morgan Stanley then conducted renovations on 1585 Broadway during the mid-2010s, overhauling one floor at a time. The exterior signs were replaced in 2015, and a 750 kW (1,010 hp) fuel cell was installed at the building the next year.

By early 2017, Morgan Stanley contemplated relocating to the new Hudson Yards development. The firm was also looking for other office space around Manhattan. Morgan Stanley stipulated that if it signed a lease with any landlord, then that landlord had to buy 1585 Broadway and 522 Fifth Avenue. Morgan Stanley could not find a buyer for 1585 Broadway, though it did manage to sell 522 Fifth Avenue in 2020. Morgan Stanley retained ownership of 1585 Broadway, even after the onset of COVID-19 pandemic in New York City, when other companies were selling or subletting their space.

In the mid-2020s, the facade of the lower stories was replaced as part of a renovation designed by Gensler, and the exterior displays from 2015 were removed. In February 2025, New York YIMBY estimated the renovation to wrap up sometime in the second half of that year. A subsequent update in January 2026 shows how the LED support structure has been assembled over the re-cladded, two-tiered base. The curved corners of the framework suggests some of the new LED billboards will share the same look as the curved displays from before the renovation. Renovation work is expected to be complete by the second half of 2026.

== Reception ==
According to architectural writer Robert A. M. Stern, 1585 Broadway's facade was "a welcome departure from the stone-clad Postmodern towers of the 1980s", and it earned many accolades. Paul Goldberger wrote for The New York Times: "For this building has a real facade, designed to stand on its own, that looks reasonable even when not a square inch of the sign space is rented." At the end of 1991, Goldberger dubbed 1585 Broadway as the "best nearly empty building of the year". In 1992, Herbert Muschamp of the Times described 1585 Broadway as "a square chaperone dressed in starchy gray, peering down sternly at the indecorous doings in the street below". Ada Louise Huxtable characterized the building as "a stunning event", saying the design "carries the sheer, sleek precision of the modernist curtain wall to new intricacy and richness". Eve M. Kahn of The Wall Street Journal described 1585 Broadway as a "water-green, restrained corporate monolith".

After the building was renovated, Stanley Abercrombie wrote for Interior Design magazine in 1996: "Above the signage area, the tower is a cool, symmetrical shaft [...] continuing the downstairs glitter with quiet composure". Of the interior, Abercrombie wrote that Gwathmey Siegel had reconciled "a potentially overwhelming number of difficult and sometimes opposing demands into a work of architecture and interior design that appears seamless, coherent, and inevitable" while "making it all look easy". When 3 Times Square was being built on the opposite end of Times Square in 1998, Muschamp wrote that 1585 Broadway was the only new building in the area that "has broken boldly out of the mold of commercial design" prior to 3 Times Square's construction.

== See also ==
- List of buildings and structures on Broadway in Manhattan
- List of tallest buildings in New York City
