= 30 East 29th Street =

Residential building in Manhattan, New York

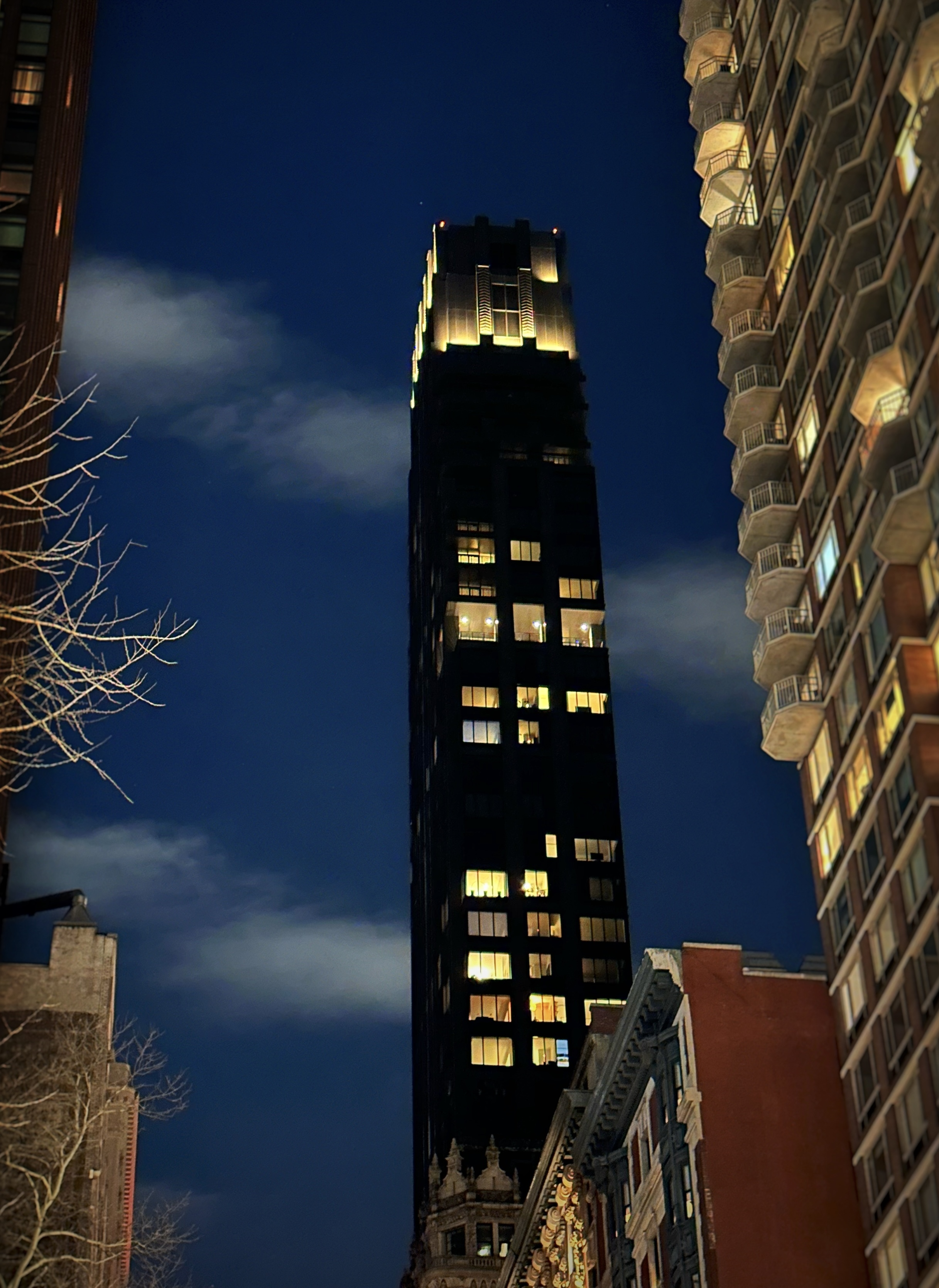
- Facade of 30 East 29th Street uplit at night
- Interactive map of the 30 East 29th Street area

General information
- Status: Completed
- Type: Residential Condominiums
- Architectural style: Postmodern, Art Deco
- Location: 30 East 29th Street, Manhattan, New York, U.S.
- Coordinates: 40°44′38.9″N 73°59′5.03″W
- Completed: 2021

Height
- Roof: 605 ft (184 m)

Technical details
- Floor count: 45

Design and construction
- Architect: CetraRuddy
- Developer: Rockefeller Group

Website
- rosehill.nyc

30 East 29th Street (also known as Rose Hill Tower) is a residential skyscraper in the Rose Hill neighborhood of Manhattan in New York City. The 605-foot-tall (184.4 m) tower is 45 stories and contains 123 condominiums. The tower was developed by the Rockefeller Group and designed by the architecture firm CetraRuddy. It is the Rockefeller Group's first residential project.

== History ==
Extell Development Company acquired the first portion of the site in 2015, paying $25.8 million for a low-rise structure at 30-32 East 29th Street. Extell subsequently bought the air rights above a seven-story building at 28 East 29th Street and a six-story building at 34 East 29th Street. In May 2017, the Rockefeller Group announced its intention to buy the site at 30-32 East 29th Street from Extell, as well as two adjacent buildings at 34 and 36 East 29th Street from W Brothers and Michael Aryeh, respectively. At the time, the Rockefeller Group planned to build a 170,000-square-foot (16,000 m^{2}) condominium project on the site. The Rockefeller Group and its development partner, Mitsubishi Estate, submitted plans to the New York City Department of Buildings in February 2018 for a 46-story apartment building.

The Israeli businessman Eyal Ofer invested $52.5 million in the proposed development in October 2018, and Rockefeller Group received another $202.5 million loan from Sumitomo Mitsui Trust Bank that month. Plans for a 600-foot-tall (180 m) tower on the site were announced in March 2019, and sales began in May 2019. Initially, the cheapest apartments were marketed for $1.2 million, while the most expensive condos cost $12 million. By that November, the building had topped out. The structure was completed in October 2021, and the spire was first illuminated in early 2022. The building was named Rose Hill Tower, after a farm that stood in the neighborhood during the 18th century.

== Architecture ==
The tower was developed by the Rockefeller Group and designed by the architecture firm CetraRuddy. It is the Rockefeller Group's first residential project. The exterior of the building is Art Deco-inspired with Gothic Revival elements. The facade is composed of a textured antique bronze-tinted grid patterned with chevrons. The chevrons were also used for in the carpets and bathroom tiling of the interiors. The condos on the upper stories of the building contain balconies. The pinnacle is illuminated by uplights.

The building's lobby has a double-height ceiling and a black marble fireplace measuring 8 feet (2.4 m) tall. Next to the lobby are two seating areas for residents, which were intended as coworking spaces. The building includes a gym and a lounge, as well as a library and an indoor pool. The design of the pool was inspired by the public bathhouses of the 1930s and 1940s, and its central wall of the pool room features a mosaic tile mural with representations of the Amazon goddesses of the time period. The building also includes a skydeck on the 37th floor, which includes a pair of terraces, a billiards room, and a dining room.

The smallest apartments are studio apartments, while the largest condominiums have four bedrooms. Many of the apartments have "flex spaces" that can be used for multiple purposes. The apartments' interior finishes include marble countertops, bronze handles and doorknobs, and wooden floors. The apartments generally have ceilings of at least 11 feet (3.4 m), The top floor includes a penthouse with three bedrooms and a private terrace. When the building was nearly completed, The New York Times described the interior's design as "playing up its Jazz Age chops".
