= 49th Street station (BMT Broadway Line) =

New York City Subway station in Manhattan

49 Street
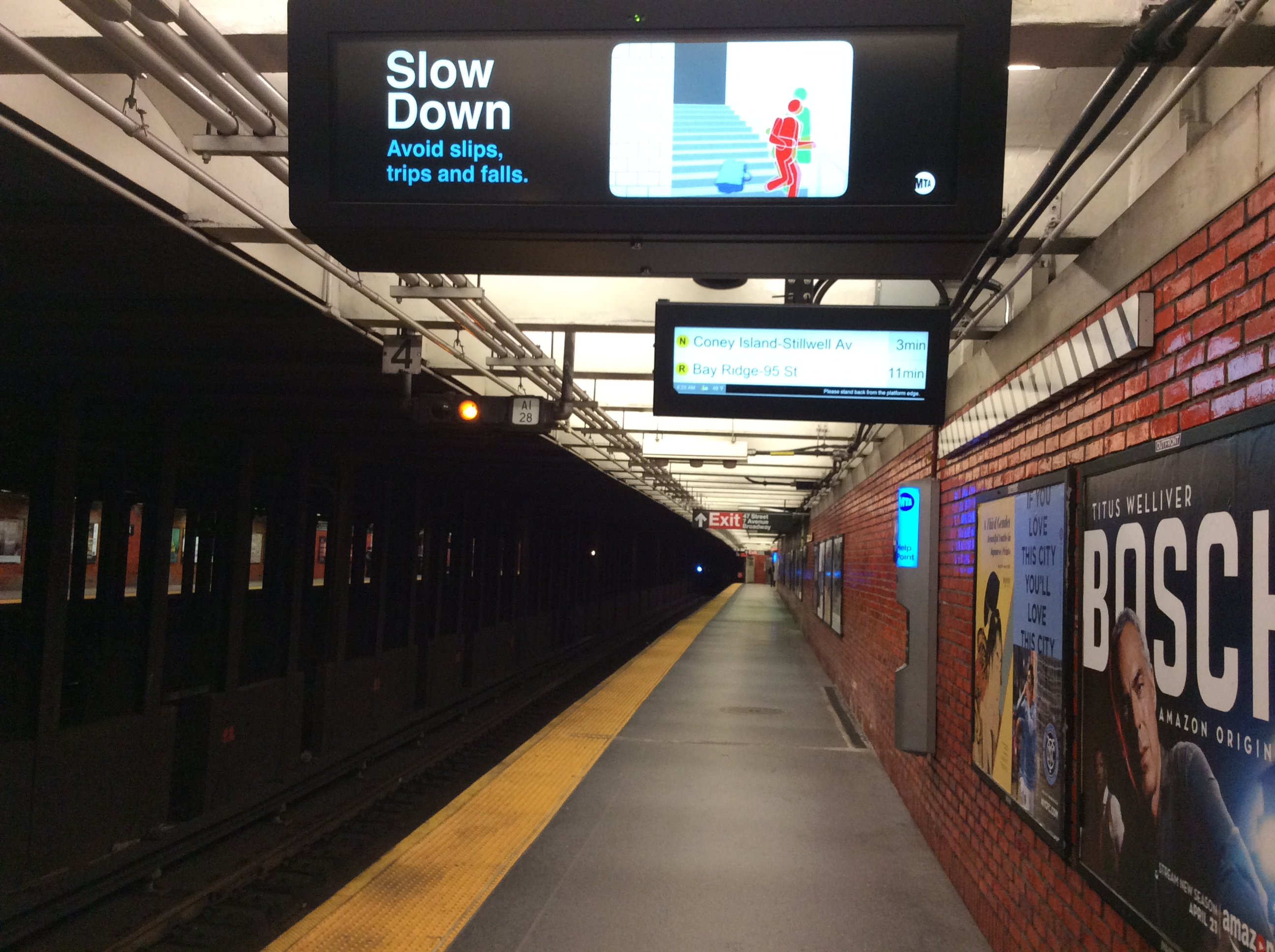
- Downtown platform

Station statistics
- Address: West 49th Street & Seventh Avenue; New York, New York
- Borough: Manhattan
- Locale: Midtown Manhattan
- Coordinates: 40.760423°N 73.983779°W
- Division: B (BMT)
- Line: BMT Broadway Line
- Services: N (all times); Q (late nights only); R (all except late nights); W (weekdays only)
- Transit: NYCT Bus: M7, M20, M50, M104; MTA Bus: BxM2
- Structure: Underground
- Platforms: 2 side platforms
- Tracks: 4

Other information
- Opened: July 10, 1919 (107 years ago)
- Rebuilt: 1973
- Accessible: Partially; full access planned (northbound platform accessible via elevator)

Traffic
- 2025: 7,386,624 ▲14%
- Rank: 29 out of 423
Services
Preceding station	New York City Subway	Following station
57th Street–Seventh Avenue N R W via Lexington Avenue–59th Street	Local	Times Square–42nd Street N R W services split
Location
Location within New York City Subway
Location within New York City
Location within New York
Track layout
Street map
Station service legend
Symbol	Description
Stops all times except late nights	Stops all times except late nights
Stops all times	Stops all times
Stops weekdays during the day	Stops weekdays during the day
Stops late nights only	Stops late nights only

The 49th Street station is a local station on the BMT Broadway Line of the New York City Subway. Located at West 49th Street and Seventh Avenue in Midtown Manhattan, it is served by the N train at all times, the R train at all times except late nights, the W train on weekdays, and the Q train during late nights.

== History ==
Operation of the Broadway Line was assigned to the Brooklyn Rapid Transit Company (BRT; after 1923, the Brooklyn–Manhattan Transit Corporation or BMT) in the Dual Contracts, adopted on March 4, 1913. Before construction started, the plans for the Broadway Line's stations in midtown were changed several times. Originally, there was going to be an express station at 47th Street, and there would have been local stations at 42nd and 57th Streets. In December 1913, the plans were changed so that both 47th and 57th Streets were express stations, and the local stop at 42nd Street was relocated to 38th Street. Opponents of the plan said it would cause large amounts of confusion, as Times Square was a "natural" transfer point. In February 1914, the PSC ordered the BRT to make the Broadway Line's 42nd Street station an express station; at that time, the station at 49th Street was changed to a local station, and 57th Street became an express station. The change was made at the insistence of Brooklynites who wanted an express station in the Theater District of Manhattan.

This station opened on July 10, 1919. Initially, the station was only served by local trains from Brooklyn, whereas express trains terminated at Times Square.

The station was operated by the BMT until the city government took over the BMT's operations on June 1, 1940.

=== 1960s and 1970s renovations ===
In September 1967, city transportation administrator Arthur E. Palmer Jr. announced that the 49th Street station would be renovated and would receive experimental amenities, maps, and signs as part of a pilot project to measure how effective improvements in station environments were on rider attitudes to transit service. Devices to melt snow would be constructed into stairways, entrances would receive brighter lighting, new fixtures would be installed in bathrooms, and token booths would be relocated to allow clerks to have unobstructed views of the entire platform. Furthermore, sound resistant barriers would be installed between local and express tracks to dampen noise. The city government applied for a grant from the United States Department of Transportation, and was awarded $1.023 million on September 30, 1968. The total estimated project cost was $2.5 million. In September 1968, a contract to extend the platforms from 570 feet (170 m) to 615 feet (187 m) to accommodate ten-car trains was awarded. This work had to be completed before work could start on the other station improvements.

In the early 1970s, the station underwent a major renovation to designs by Philip Johnson and John Burgee. During this renovation, the original decorations were replaced with bright orange tiles. In addition, the station was repainted, new token booths were installed, the floors were redone in terrazzo, the lighting was replaced, six entrances were renovated, and an additional staircase was added at the southeastern corner of 47th Street and Seventh Avenue. Johnson said the renovations had been intended to give the station a cheerful character, "like a big shopping center". Noise-dampening panels were installed on the ceilings and tracks as part of an experiment. Work on the project began on March 28, 1973; at the time, it was budgeted at $1.7 million. The renovation was finished the same year.

== Station layout ==
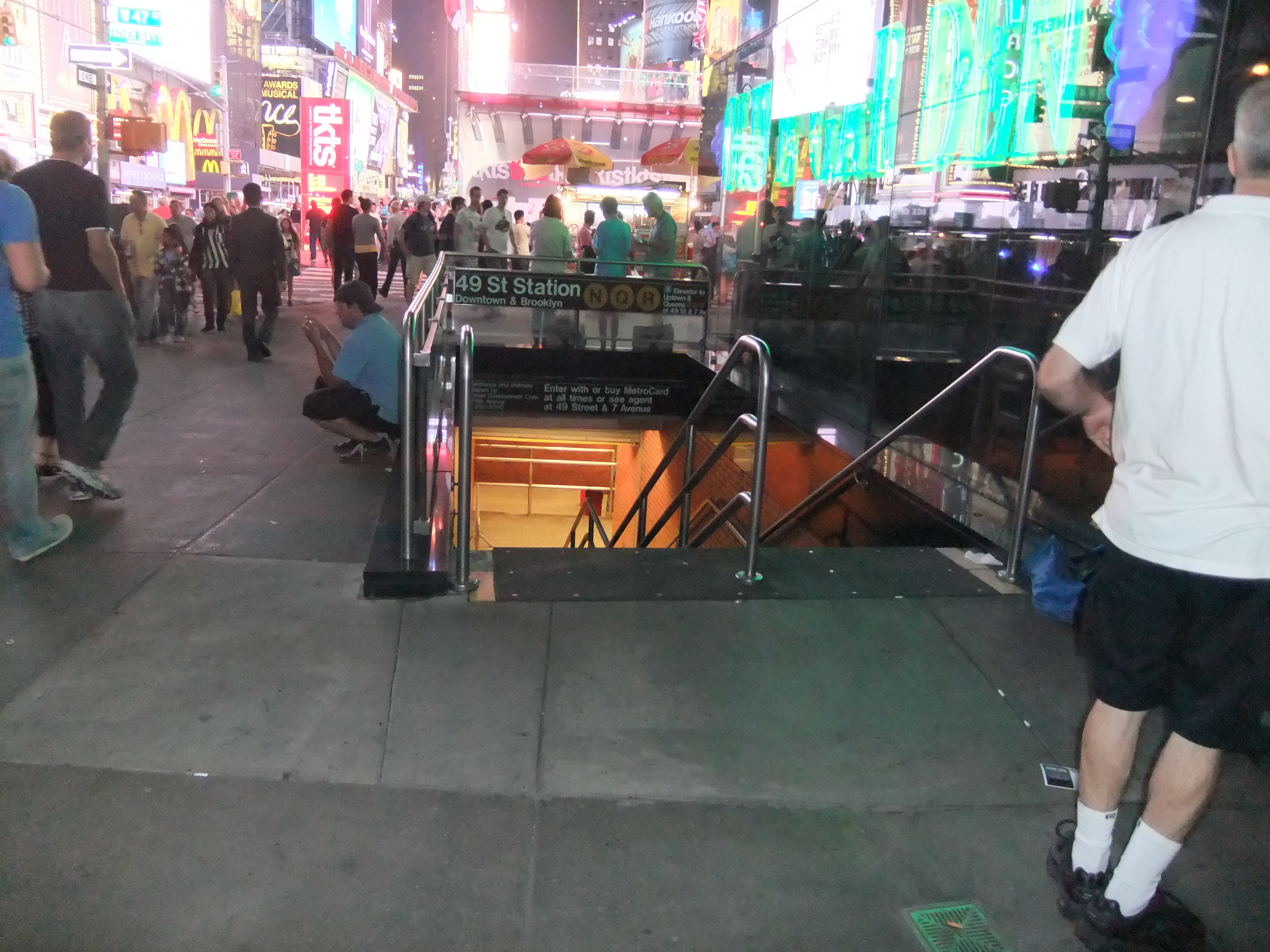
Entrance to downtown trains at 49th Street

This underground station has four tracks and two side platforms. The two center express tracks are used by the Q train at all times except late nights.

49th Street was originally built in the same style as the other BMT Broadway stations. The red glazed brick was installed over the original BMT-style tiled walls as part of the 1973 renovation, as were ceiling noise-dampening panels and terrazzo flooring. The station also had tile and concrete benches at some point in the late 20th century. Since the renovation, three of the four street entrances have been reconstructed, leaving only the 47th Street exit on the southbound platform with the red brick appearance; additionally, the noise dampening experiment was not repeated at any other station. Additional false brick tiles were added some time after the 1973 renovation, indicating the presence of a station facility. A passageway leading to an exit at West 47th Street and Broadway was also added after the renovation. Also, one of the staircases on the southbound side is walled off, making only one staircase available to the southbound side. Yellow tactile treads on both platforms' edges were installed in 2015.

South of this station, the downtown local track descends slightly before ascending again. This is due to Broadway and Seventh Avenue intersecting at the narrow point of Times Square under 45th Street. As a result, the downtown local track of the BMT Broadway Line has to cross beneath the uptown local track of the IRT Broadway–Seventh Avenue Line.

=== Exits ===
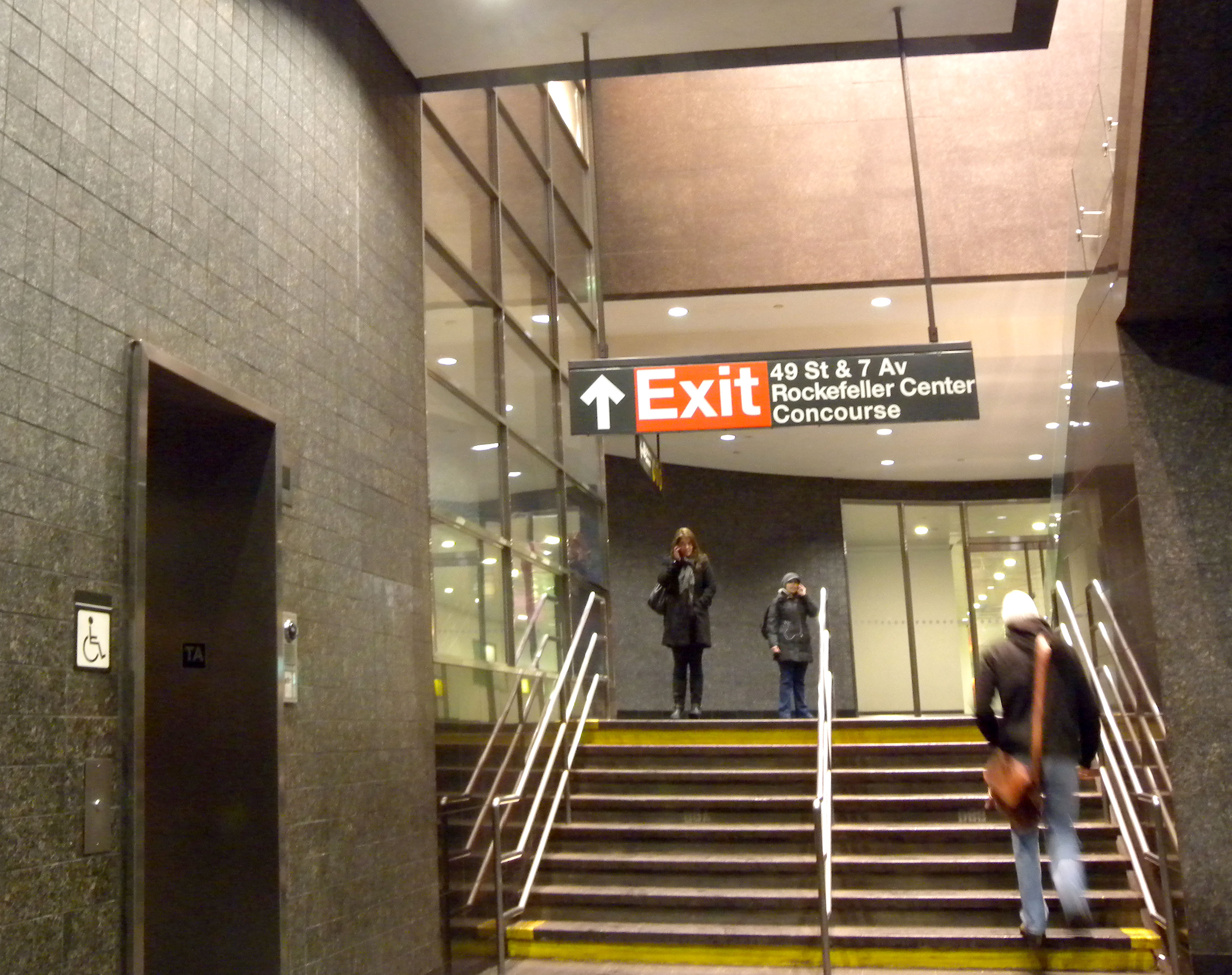
Passageway to Rockefeller Center

There are four sets of platform-level fare controls, with no crossover or crossunder. Each platform has a full-time booth at the north end (49th Street) and a part-time booth at the south end (47th Street). Only the northbound platform is ADA-accessible. An elevator was constructed in conjunction with a new office tower at the northeast corner of West 49th Street and Seventh Avenue. The elevator conceals an out-of-system underground passageway leading to Rockefeller Center and the 47th–50th Streets station on the IND Sixth Avenue Line.

- One stair and one elevator, within 745 Seventh Avenue building, NE corner of 7th Avenue and 49th Street (northbound only)
- One stair, within 1626 Broadway building, NW corner of 7th Avenue and 49th Street (southbound only)
- One stair, on street, SW corner of 7th Avenue and 49th Street (southbound only)
- One stair, within TSX Broadway (under Palace Theatre), SE corner of 7th Avenue and 47th Street (northbound only)
- Two stairs, on street underneath 2 Times Square building, north side of 47th Street between Broadway and 7th Avenue (southbound only)
