= Rockefeller Group =

American private company

Rockefeller Group International, Inc.
- Formerly: Metropolitan Square Corporation
- Type: Subsidiary
- Industry: Real estate
- Headquarters: New York, New York, United States
- Parent: Mitsubishi Estate Co.
- Website: rockefellergroup.com

Rockefeller Group International, Inc. is an American private company based in New York City, primarily involved in real estate operations in the United States and it is a subsidiary of Mitsubishi Group. The company began with the development of Rockefeller Center. Mitsubishi Estate, a real estate company of the Mitsubishi Group, purchased the Rockefeller Group in 1989.

After completing the original 6,000,000-square-foot (560,000 m^{2}), Art Deco complex from 1931 to 1939 (the company name was then the Metropolitan Square Corporation), the company developed several towers in the immediate vicinity from the late 1940s into the 1950s and 1960s. It entered into a partnership with Time Inc. and constructed a 48-story building for the company, 1271 Avenue of the Americas, that opened in 1959. By the early 1970s, it had added three more International Style towers to Rockefeller Center, more than doubling the size of the original complex. The Rockefeller Group filed for bankruptcy protection in May 1995 after missing several mortgage payments.

Today, Rockefeller Group maintains an ownership/management position in the 7,700,000 square feet (720,000 m^{2}) of office space that makes up Rockefeller Center's western corridor (the newer buildings located west of Sixth Avenue). The eastern and original part of the Center is now owned by Tishman Speyer (who also serves as manager) and the Lester Crown family of Chicago, Illinois.
