= Bendl =

Bendl is a surname. Notable people with the surname include:

- Ignaz Bendl (died c.1730), Bohemian painter, sculptor, medalist and ivory engraver, who worked mainly in Vienna and Brno
- Johann-Georg Bendl (1620–1680), Baroque sculptor mainly at work in Prague
- Karel Bendl (1838–1897), Czech composer
- Petr Bendl (born 1966), Czech politician

== See also ==
- Bendel (disambiguation)
