= DRNH =

Architectural studio in Brno, Czech Republic

- Industry: Architecture
- Founded: 1991; 34 years ago in Brno, Czech Republic
- Founders: Antonín Novák, Petr Valenta
- Website: drnh.cz

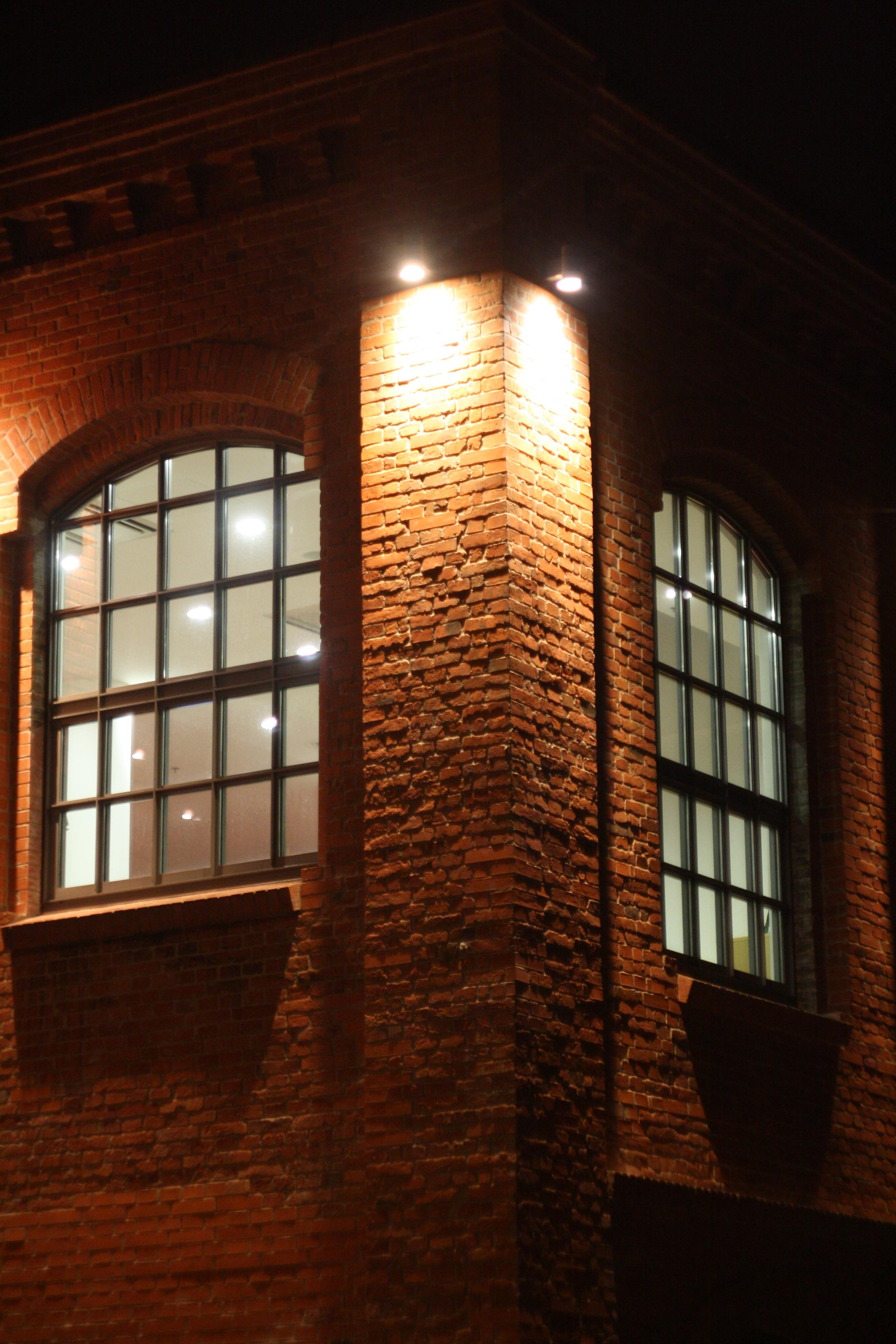
Vaňkovka Shopping Center and Gallery, an exterior detail

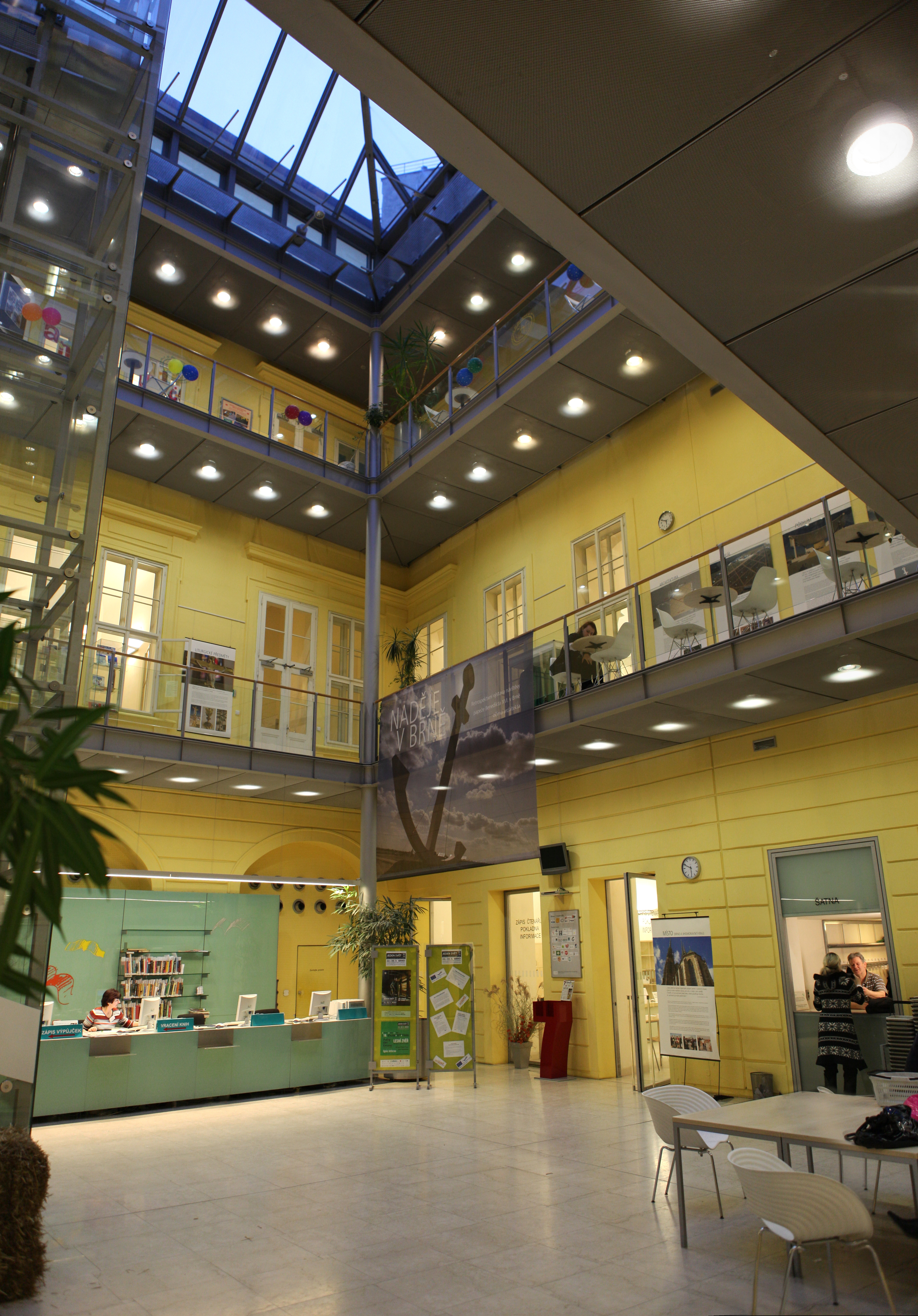
Interior of the Jiří Mahen Library (Schrattenbach Palace) in Brno

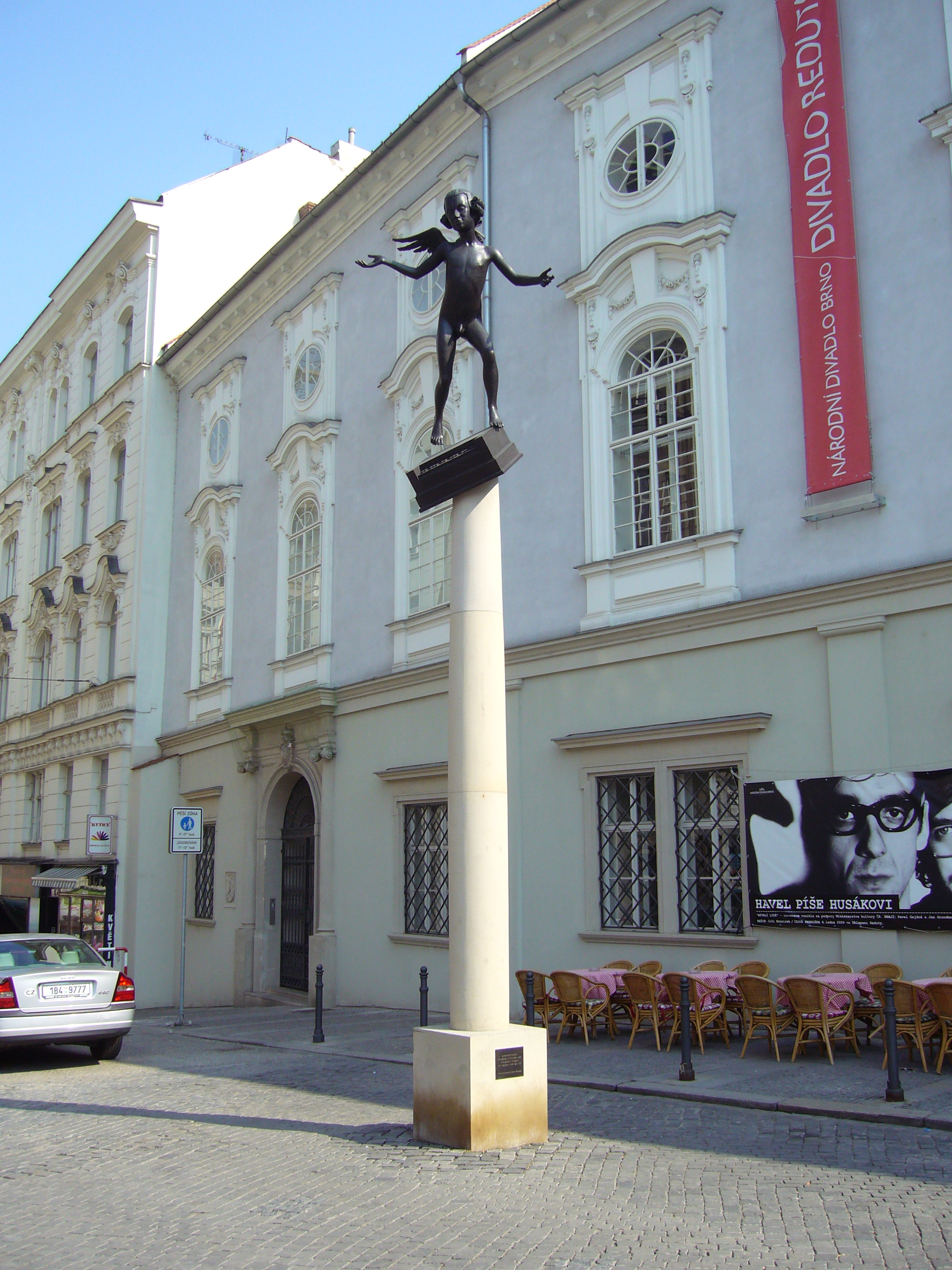
Mozart's statue in front of the reconstructed Reduta Theatre in Brno

DRNH is a Czech architectural studio established in 1991 in Brno. It was founded by architects Antonín Novák and Petr Valenta.

The studio focuses on issues of the relationship between landscape and building, city and building not only in relation to environmental aspects of construction. DRNH has won numerous Czech architectural awards.

== Projects ==
- Reconstruction of the riding hall of the Lednice Castle, Lednice, 2012
- The National Centre of Garden Culture in Kroměříž, 2012, (nominated for 2013 Building of the Year)
- Indoor Swimming Pool in Litomyšl, 2010
- Apartment house, Brno, 2010
- Residential complex "Na Krutci" (with Kuba - Pilař architects), 2008, Praha
- Home for the elderly in Brno, 2006
- Reduta Theatre reconstruction, 2005, Brno (won the Building of the Year award (2006) and Grand Prix of the Society of Czech Architects - National Architecture Award (2006))
- Restoration of former Wannieck Factory Production Hall for Wannieck Gallery, 2005, Brno
- Reconstruction and Extension of the Kraví Hora Recreation and Sports Facility, 2004, Brno
- Apotheke - Renewal of St. Kunhuta's Chapel, 2002, Brno
- Apartment house, Brno, 2003
- Head-office of public transport company DPMB (with RAW Architects), Brno, 2001
- Reconstruction of Jiří Mahen Library in Brno, 2001

== Awards ==
- 2004 - Main Prize in the competition Swimming Pool of the Year (2004) in the Czech Republic for reconstruction and extension of the Kraví Hora Recreation and Sports Facility
- 2005 - Main Prize Grand Prix OA (Grand Prix of the Society of Czech Architects) for Reconstruction and Extension of the Kraví Hora Recreation and Sports Facility
- 2005 - Main prize in the 3rd annual competition Building with Environmental Benefits in the Czech Republic for reconstruction and extension of the Kraví Hora Recreation and Sports Facility
- 2006 - Grand Prix OA in category reconstruction for Reconstruction of Reduta Theatre
- 2006 - Building of the Year for Reconstruction of Reduta Theatre
- 2011 - Building of the Year for Indoor Swimming Pool, Litomyšl
- 2012 - Grand Prix OA in category new building for Indoor Swimming Pool, Litomyšl
- 2013 - Grand Prix OA honorable mention in category new building for Gardening center of Kroměříž Archbishop's Palace
- 2013 - title Architect of the Year 2013 in Czech Republic for Antonín Novák

== Bibliography ==
- Novák, Antonín; Valenta, Petr (2014). Sloupky o architektuře (in Czech). Archa. ISBN 9788087545263.
