= Bendel =

Bendel may refer to:

- Bendel (surname)
- Mid-Western Region, Nigeria, known as Bendel
  - List of governors of Bendel State
  - Bendel United
  - Bendel Insurance Football Club (also known as Insurance of Benin Football Club)

== See also ==
- Benin
- Bendl
