= Ignaz Bendl =

Ignaz Johann Bendl (Czech: Ignác Jan Bendl; c. 1650 – c. 1730) was a Czech-Austrian painter, sculptor, medalist and ivory engraver. He worked mainly in Vienna and Brno.

== Life ==
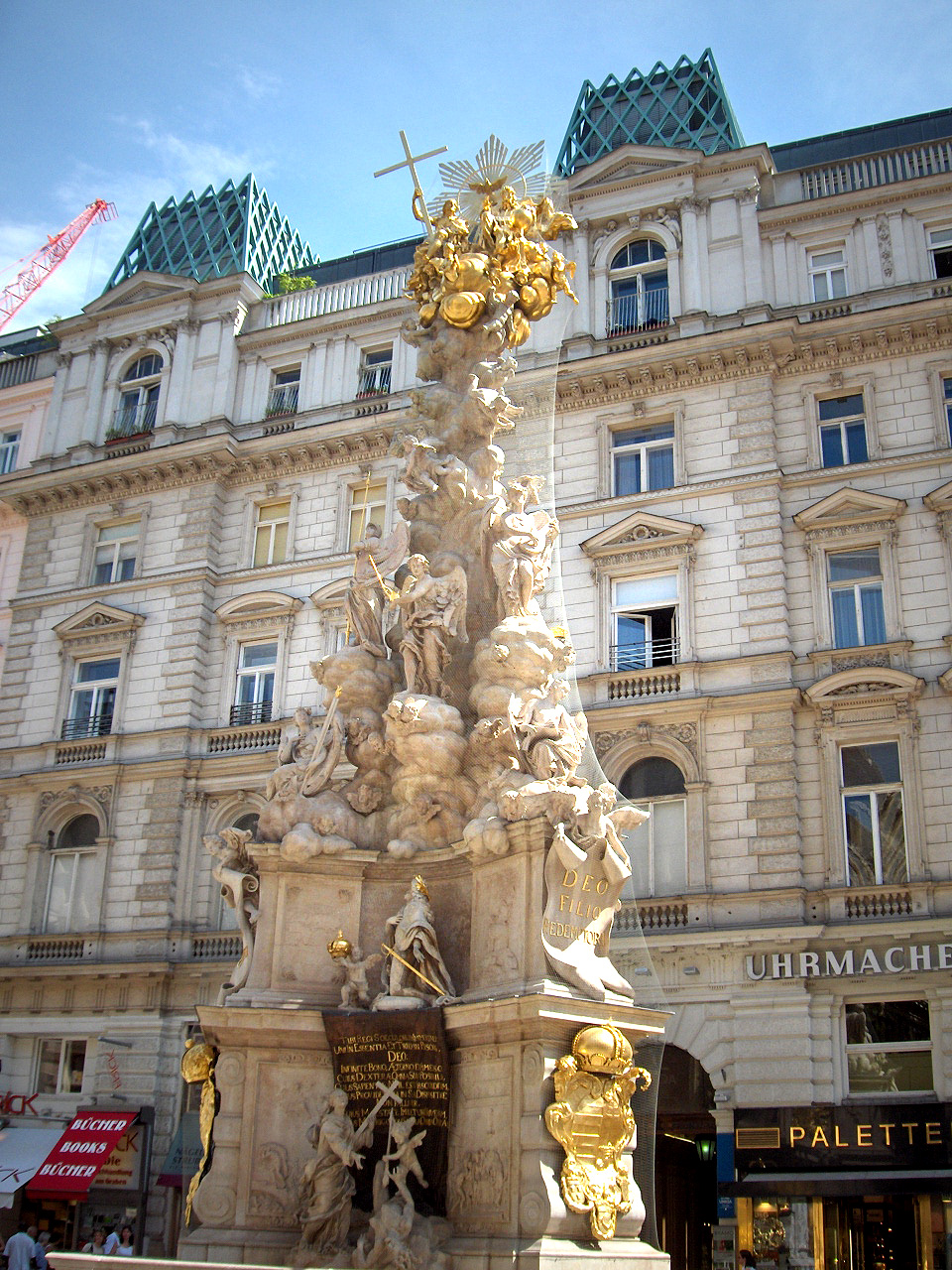
Plague column, Vienna

He was born in c. 1650. There is almost nothing known about his life. According to Grove's Dictionary of Art, he was born, perhaps as the son of Johann-Georg Bendl, in Pfarrkirchen. There are two towns called Pfarrkirchen in Upper Austria, therefore it is undecided which one it might have been. There is no date of birth. He died circa 1730, but again no mention where.

== Remaining works ==
- twelve ivory reliefs (only one signed by him) of classical gods and heroes (1684)
- twelve relief medallions with sybils's heads. Both the reliefs and medallions are on display in the Kunsthistorisches Museum, Vienna.
- the altarpiece Franz von Paula; Paulanerkirche, Vienna
- ivory medallion Triumphal arch designed for the coronation of emperor Joseph II; Victoria and Albert Museum, London (1690)
- He made the sculptural group of mythological figures (Neptune, Vulcan, Ceres and Mercury) for a fountain, following the style of Bernini in 1693–1694. They were later transferred into the middle of the Bishop's Court of the Moravian Museum, Brno, from the Square of the Liberty in 1858. Ignaz Bendl also made an engraving of this fountain.
- He made equally an engraving (1697) of the Parnassus Fountain on the Zelný trh, Brno. This is a baroque fountain decorated with many allegorical figures, animals and dragons. It was built according to a design made by Johann Bernhard Fischer von Erlach. This engraving may be an indication that Bendl sculpted these figures.
- His best known works are the six lower reliefs on the Baroque Plague Column on the Graben in Vienna.
- A number of etchings of designs for ceiling ornaments (1699)
- Etchings of religious and mythological themes: Scenes of Antique Legends (1700)
- Plates of applied arts design in a proto-Rococo style, now in the Museum of Applied Arts, Vienna.
