= Bendel (surname) =

Bendel is a surname. Notable people with the surname include:

- Franz Bendel (1833–1874), Bohemian-German pianist and composer
- Graham Bendel, writer and filmmaker
- Hans Bendel (1814–1853), Swiss painter
- Henri Bendel, American upscale women's specialty store based in New York City
- Henri Willis Bendel (1868–1936), American businessman, fashion designer, and philanthropist
- Jochen Bendel (born 1967), German television moderator
