= Henri Willis Bendel =

American fashion designer

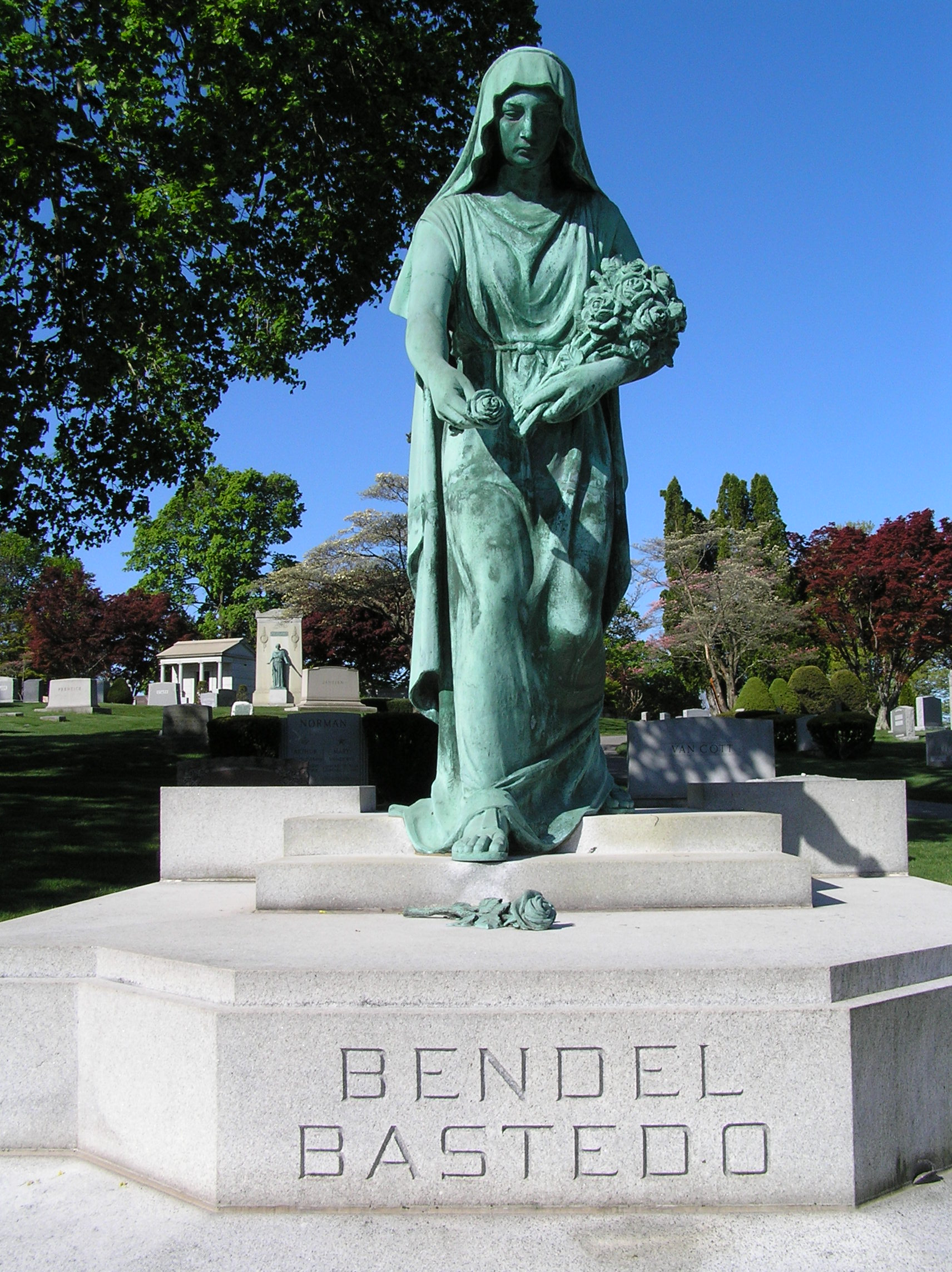
- Memorial to Henri Bendel in Kensico Cemetery
- Born: January 22, 1868; Vermillionville, Louisiana, U.S.
- Died: March 22, 1936 (aged 68); New York City, U.S.
- Resting place: Kensico Cemetery, Valhalla, New York
- Known for: Henri Bendel, Inc.
- Spouse: Blanche Lehman

Henri Willis Bendel (January 22, 1868 – March 22, 1936) was an American businessman, fashion designer, and philanthropist who founded an upscale women's fashion company bearing his name in New York City, which remained in business until 2019.

== Early life ==
Born on January 22, 1868, to a Jewish family in Vermillionville, Louisiana (today Lafayette), the son of Mary (née Plonsky) and William Louis Bendel. Both his parents were immigrants: his father from Austria, and his mother from Prussia. His father died when he was six years old. His mother was an astute businesswoman who owned and operated a retail furniture outlet, a drug store, a dry goods store, and an undertaking parlor. She remarried in 1878 to Benjamin Falk, who would become one of the most successful Lafayette businessmen of his time. They operated a dry goods store above which was Falk's Opera House that provided vaudevillian and opera entertainment. Henri graduated from the Jesuit-run St. Charles College in Grand Coteau, Louisiana, and converted to Christianity either as a student or shortly after completing his studies.

== Fashion shops ==
After a fire burned down a millinery shop which Bendel had established in Morgan City, Louisiana, he and his wife Blanche moved to New York City in 1899.

Remaining in New York, Henri Bendel was able to use his fashion designing skills to develop a very successful millinery shop on Ninth Street in Greenwich Village, that catered to the city's wealthy. The business expanded into custom-made dresses, and the French-speaking Bendel enhanced his store's reputation for exclusivity by importing fashions from Paris. In 1913, he built an eight-story women's store at number 10 West 57th Street, designed by architect Henry Otis Chapman. Other fashion houses soon opened nearby, and West 57th Street became known as the "Rue de la Paix of New York".

In 1916, Henri Bendel built a waterfront mansion on a 12-acre (4.9 ha) at Kings Point, Long Island, New York, which was also designed by Henry Otis Chapman, with its landscaping by Charles Wellford Leavitt. Bendel sold it in 1923, to automobile maker Walter Chrysler. Today, the property is known as Wiley Hall and serves as an administration building at the United States Merchant Marine Academy. In 1927, Bendel acquired 213 arpents (179.9 acres) along the Vermilion River in Louisiana. Formerly the Walnut Grove Plantation, he built a house on the property he called Camellia Lodge. Sold and eventually subdivided for housing, it is known today as Bendel Gardens. In addition, in the late 1920s, Bendel built a mansion on a hill overlooking Laurel Lake in Stamford, Connecticut, designed by architect Perry Barker.

== Personal life ==
In 1894, Henri Bendel married Blanche Lehman, a daughter of Aaron Lehman and a member of the Lehman family, whom he had met while she was visiting friends in Morgan City. His wife died in childbirth in July 1895 along with the baby. Bendel never remarried. Henri Bendel died suddenly on March 22, 1936, at his home at 399 Park Avenue in Manhattan. A generous employer, in 1923 he had given his employees a forty-five percent equity in the business, a gift with a book value at the time of $1.8 million. In his will, he made Abraham Beekman Bastedo, his companion for over 30 years, one of the principal benefactors of his estate. Bastedo received $200,000 and a large shareholding in the business, plus the use of his country estate.

Bendel Road in Lafayette, Louisiana, is named in his honor.
