= Moravian cuisine =

Cooking traditions of Moravia

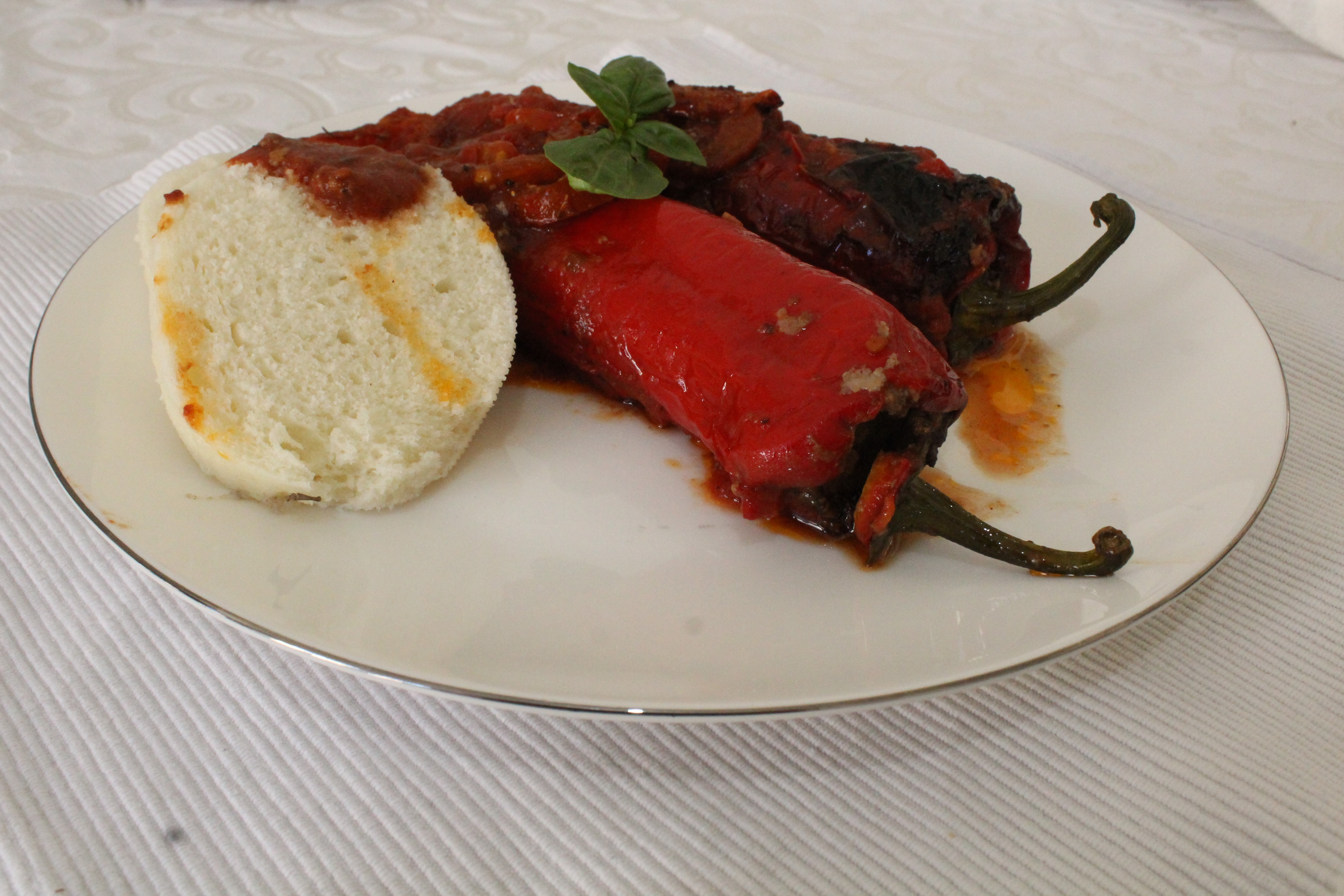
Plněné papriky/Baked pepper

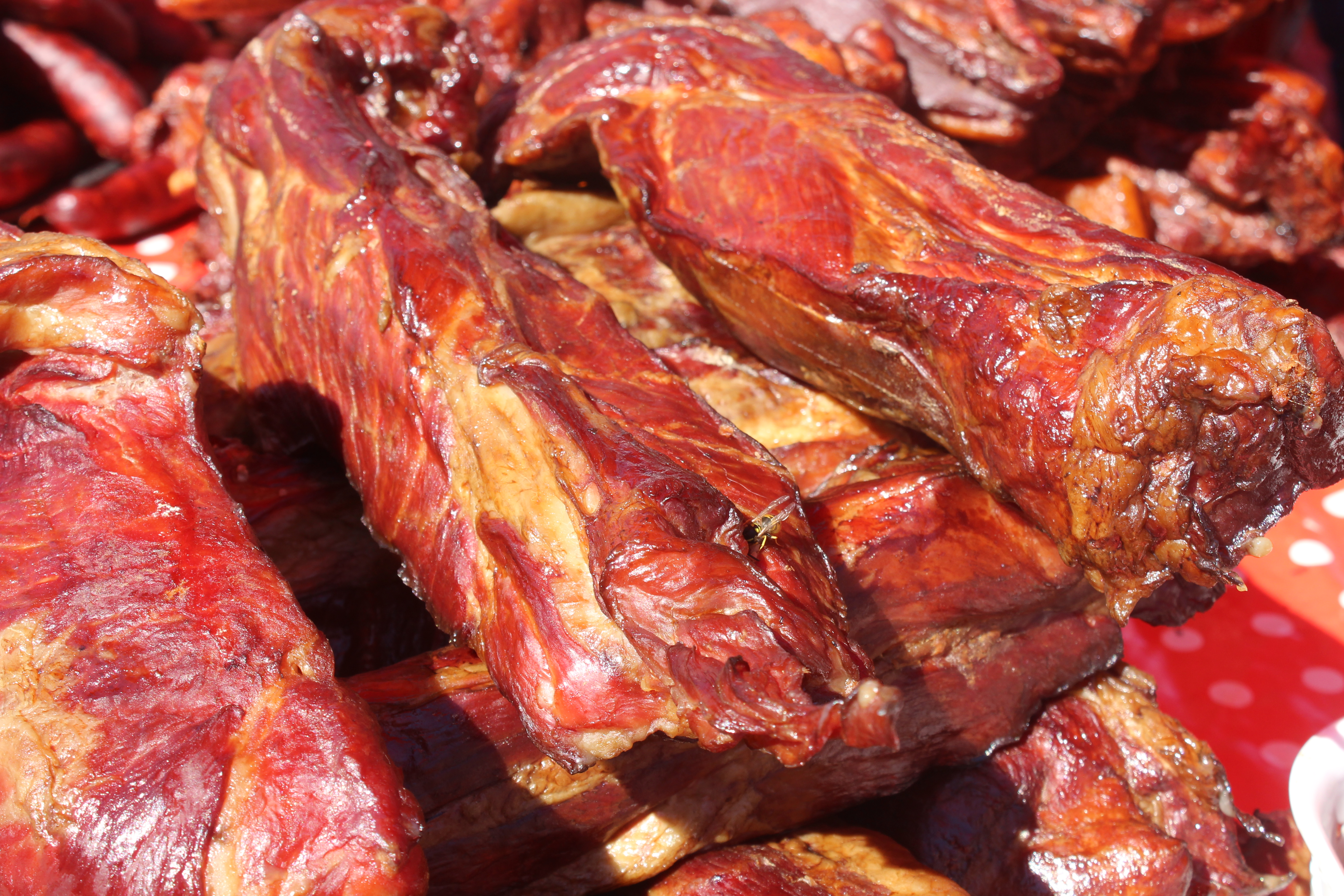
Moravian smoker

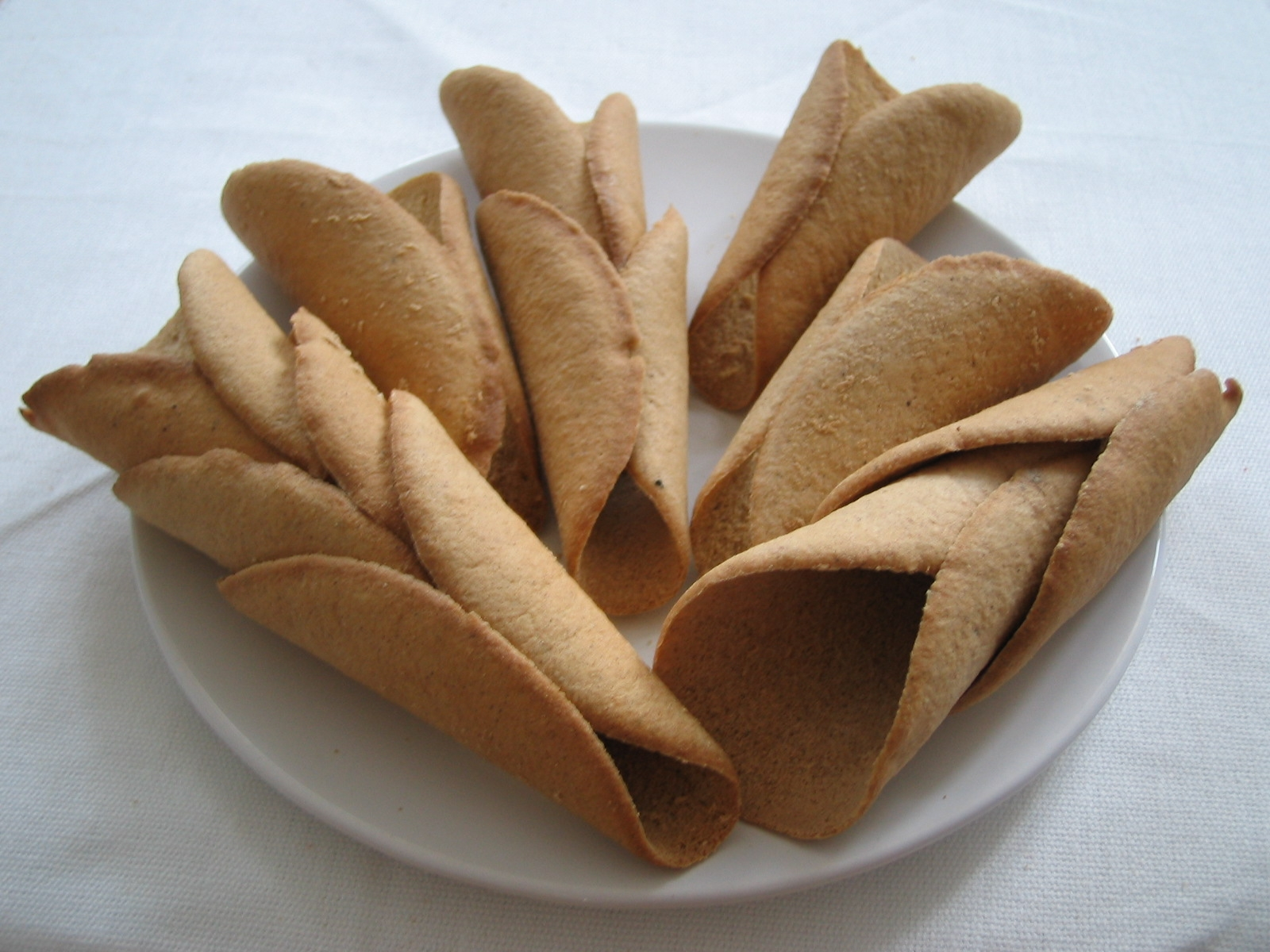
Štramberské uši ("Štramberk ears")

Moravian cuisine (Czech: Moravská kuchyně, German: Mährische Küche, Polish: Kuchnia morawska) encompasses the cooking styles, traditions and recipes associated with Moravia, a region of the Czech Republic (eastern part) and historically belongs to the Moravia, former historical country in Central Europe. Today, it is often perceived as an integral part of Czech cuisine, to which it has over the last century been artificially accommodated and mixed. Nevertheless, there is a large list of dishes, drinks and customs that are original only for Moravia.

Moravian cuisine includes many pork and poultry meat and knödel dishes (koláčky, gulivary, pěry), and often uses flour, in the south many vegetables and fruits such as plums.

== Character ==
Moravian cuisine makes much use of pork meat (in Moravian Wallachia also lamb), goose and duck meat and wild game (hares, partridges and pheasants). Lard (sádlo), goose fat (husí sádlo) and duck fat (kachní sádlo), beechnut oil and grape oil were mainly used as dish grease; butter was historically expensive and rare, and olive oil was imported. Especially in the south, there was an abundance of vegetables, particularly white cabbage, red cabbage, peppers (paprika), Savoy cabbage, cucumbers, beans, peas, cauliflower, rutabaga, celeriac, beetroot, kale, lentils, and pumpkin. In the southern part of Moravia there are vineyards, and wine and related products are used in the kitchen: grape oil, wine jelly, jam and powidl (prune butter), wine vinegar, raisins, and brandy. Moravia has more fruit orchards than Bohemia. Its most abundant fruits are apricots, peaches, plums and almonds. In southern Moravia there are also watermelons, figs and mulberries.

== Spices and herbs ==
The dominant spices are caraway, marjoram, onion (the local variety), garlic (the local variety), and to a lesser extent also thyme, parsley, rosemary, saffron, ramson/wild garlic/bear's garlic, satureja, garden cress, mugwort, and chives, which have been planted and cultivated for many centuries (they were originally Mediterranean herbs).

== History ==
Street markets played an important role in the development of Moravian cuisine, for example the cabbage market (Zelný trh) in Brno, which has existed for 850 years.

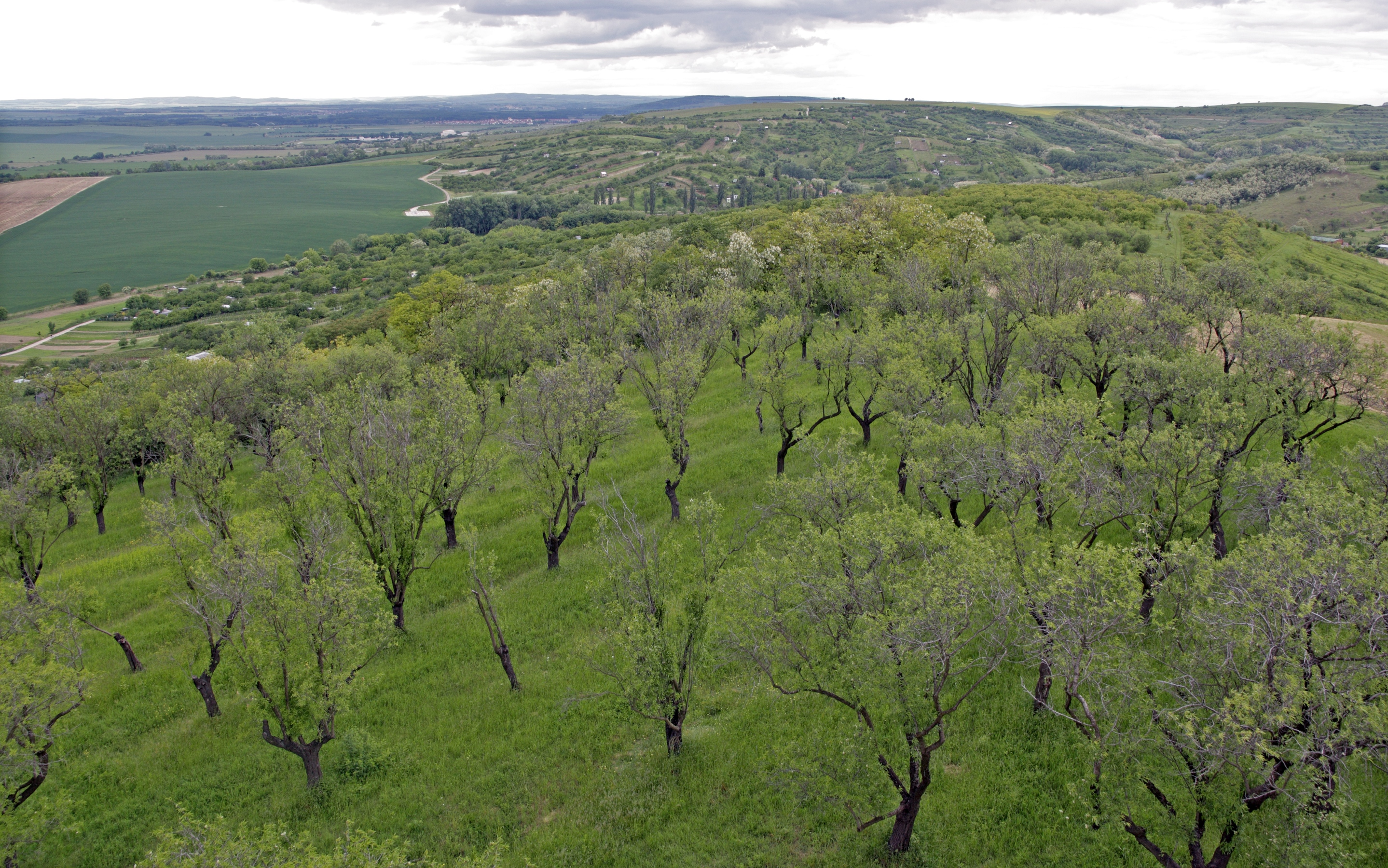
Almods orchards, Hustopeče

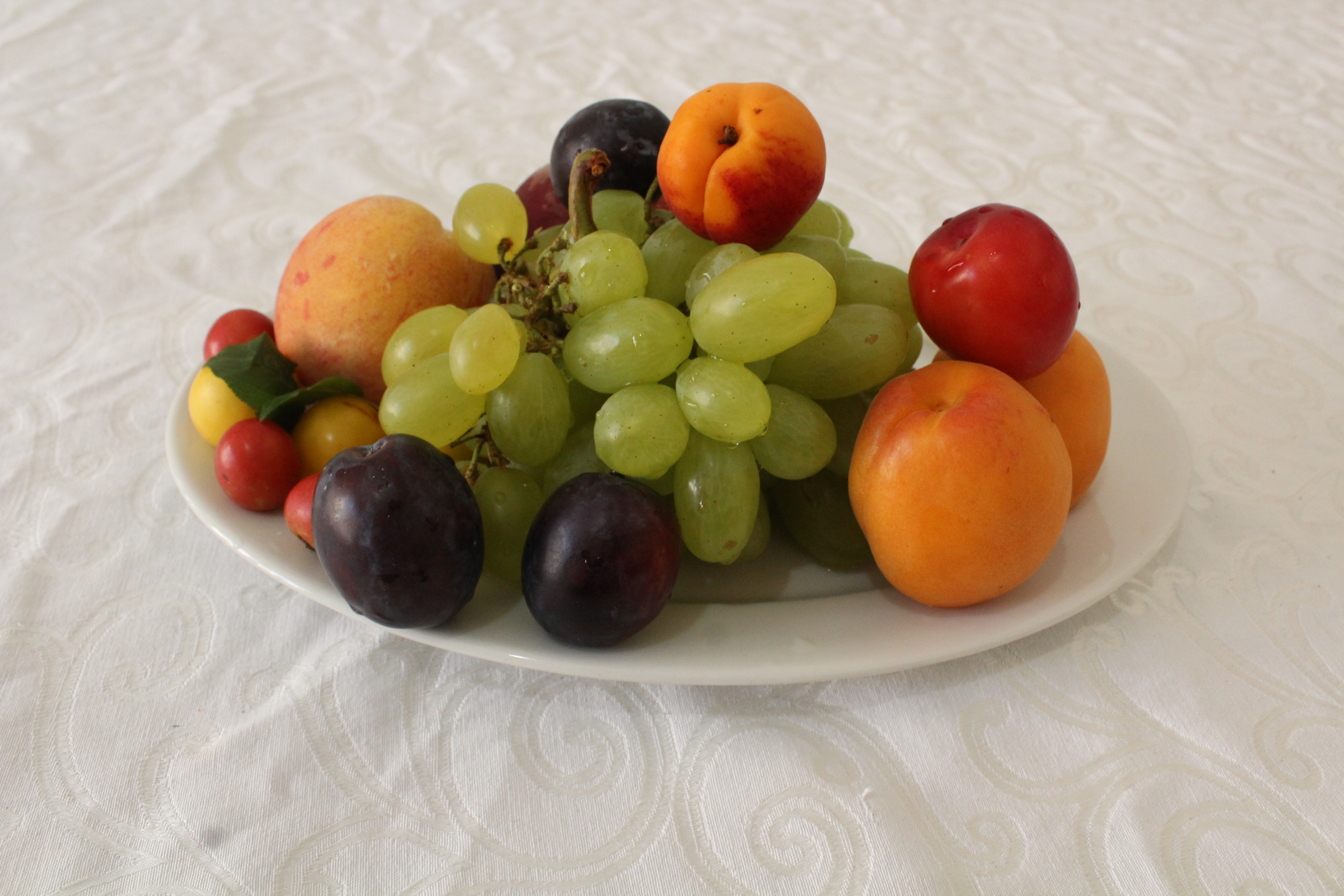
Fruits planted in Moravia

== List of Moravian dishes ==
- Stuffed peppers (paprica)
- Moravian sparrow (moravský vrabec)
- Halušky (together with Slovakia)
- Olomoucké tvarůžky
- Šulánky s makem, Mohnnudel (poppy seed noodles)
- Kyselica (zelňačka - zelná polévka/sauerkraut soup)
- Marillenknödl (meruňkové knedlíky/marholové gulivary)
- Plum dumplings (švestkové knedlíky/trnkové koláčky)
- Stryky
- Pohančena
- Tlačenka
- Bigos together with Silesia and Poland
- Powidl

== Drinks ==
- Slivovitz Plum brandy-Slivovica/trnkovica.
- Jablkovica, hruškovica, ringlovica, meruňkovica...(fruit spirits)
- Kofola
- Wine (Moravian muscat, Pálava...)
- Ondrášovka
- Hanácká kyselka
- ZON
- Vincentka (mineral water)
- Bezovka (popular home made water) Elderflower cordial
- Šaratica (mineral water)
- Apple juice (jablečný mošt)
- Burčák (low alcohol wine must) Federweisser

== See also ==
- Czech wine
- Austrian cuisine
- Slovak cuisine
- Czech cuisine
- Hungarian cuisine
- Silesian cuisine
- Polish cuisine
