= Johann Georg Bendl =

Czech Baroque sculptor

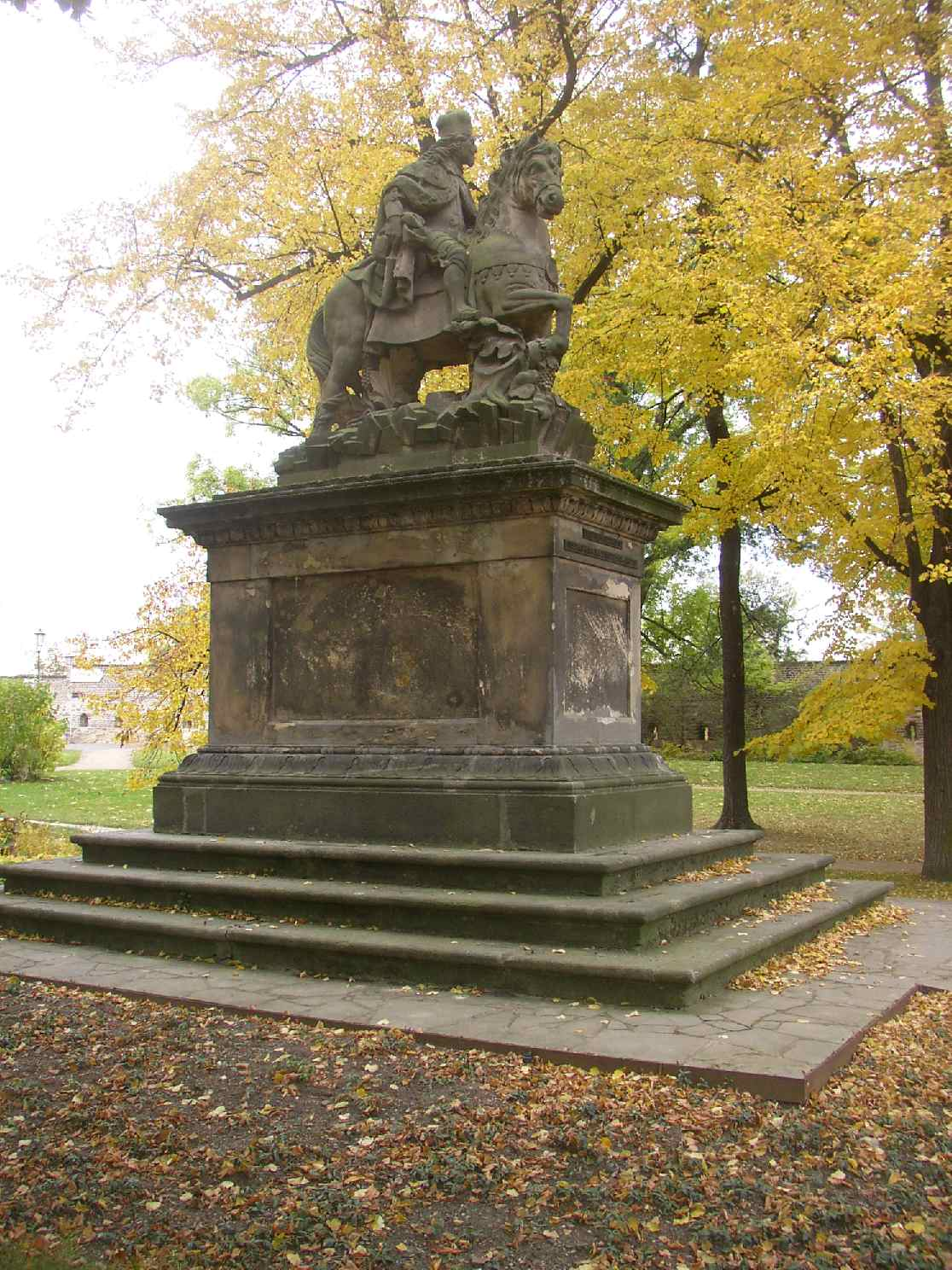
Statue of Saint Wenceslas

Johann-Georg Bendl (German: [ˈjoːhan ˈɡeːɔʁk ˈbɛndl̩]; before 1620 – 27 May 1680 in Prague), or Jan Jiří Bendl (Czech: [jan ˈjɪr̝iː ˈbɛndl̩]), was a Bohemian Baroque sculptor, who worked mainly in Prague.

He was the son of fellow sculptor Georg Bendl (c. 1570–1656) and is considered the first important Bohemian Baroque sculptor. His sculptural style was imitated by many successors, and some of his statues can be seen at the National Gallery in the St. George Convent in the Prague Castle.

== Works ==
The wooden pulpit (since destroyed) of the St. Wenceslas Church (of the Augustinian Order) in Prague, was probably one of his earliest works. He also sculpted the pulpit in the church Kostel Panny Marie pod Řetězem in the Prague district Malá Strana. All the most important churches in Prague eventually would order one or more statues.

In 1648 he sculpted the statues for side chapels in the Church of Our Lady of Týn, the church on the main square of Prague. He decorated the dome of the St. Salvator church of the Jesuit Order in Prague with stucco in the period 1648–1649. This would later bring in new orders from these Jesuits in 1655–1660 to sculpt the stone statues for the portico and the pediment of the façade; at the end of his life, in 1675, he would carve a series of wooden statues of Apostles for confessionals for the same church.

He was commissioned in 1650 by Ferdinand III, Holy Roman Emperor to produce in Prague a sculpture of the Immaculate Conception to commemorate the Peace of Westphalia ending the Thirty Years' War in 1648. Around 1650 he also sculpted a number of wooden angels for the Servite Order, now on display in St. George's Convent, National Gallery in Prague. That same year he was asked to make the statues for the main altar of the Church of the Holy Cross (now on the high altar of the St. Jindrich's (St. Henry's) church) and he carved a statue of a saint for the same church at some time in the 1650s, now at the City Museum of Prague)

His monumental Marian column (1650) on the Old Town Square in Prague (destroyed in 1918) would set an example of Baroque style for the next decades. Remaining part can be seen at the Lapidarium of the National Museum of Prague. He sculpted six statues of the Doctors of the Church in 1659.

The high-quality bronzed statues of St. Jerome and Mary Magdalen in the Chapel of St. Vincent Ferrer (Dominican church, Vienna) were produced by his workshop. He decorated the façade of the St. Salvator Church in Prague with several statues : (on top) Christ with the four Evangelists, (below) Mary, the Doctors of the Church and Jesuit saints.

In 1662 he sculpted the statue of Saint Wenceslaus in the old deanery of the St. Vitus Cathedral of the Prague Castle. He added to the façade of the St. George Basilica the statues of the founders of the church: Vratislaus I of Bohemia and Mlada, founder of the convent.

In 1670 he sculpted the Hercules and Cerberus fountain for the imperial garden in the Belvedere of the same castle, setting again a stylistic example for Bohemian sculpture. He sculpted a statue of a saint for the high altar of St. Stephen's Church in 1678. His last known works are two statues of the national patron saint Saint Wenceslaus (between 1676 and 1678), one on a column near the Charles Bridge and an equestrian statue on Wenceslas Square (transferred to Vyšehrad in 1879).

== See also ==
- Ignaz Bendl
