= Zelný trh =

Square and marketplace in Brno

- General view over the Zelný trh area
- Interactive map of the Zelný trh area

General information
- Location: Brno, Czech Republic
- Coordinates: 49°11′33″N 16°36′33″E
- Opened: Late 12th century
- Management: Správa Zelného trhu

Zelný trh (German: Kraut Markt; English: 'Vegetable Market' or 'Cabbage Market') is a square and traditional marketplace in Brno, Czech Republic. It is located in the historic centre of Brno on an area of about 0.6 hectares (1.5 acres).

== The square ==
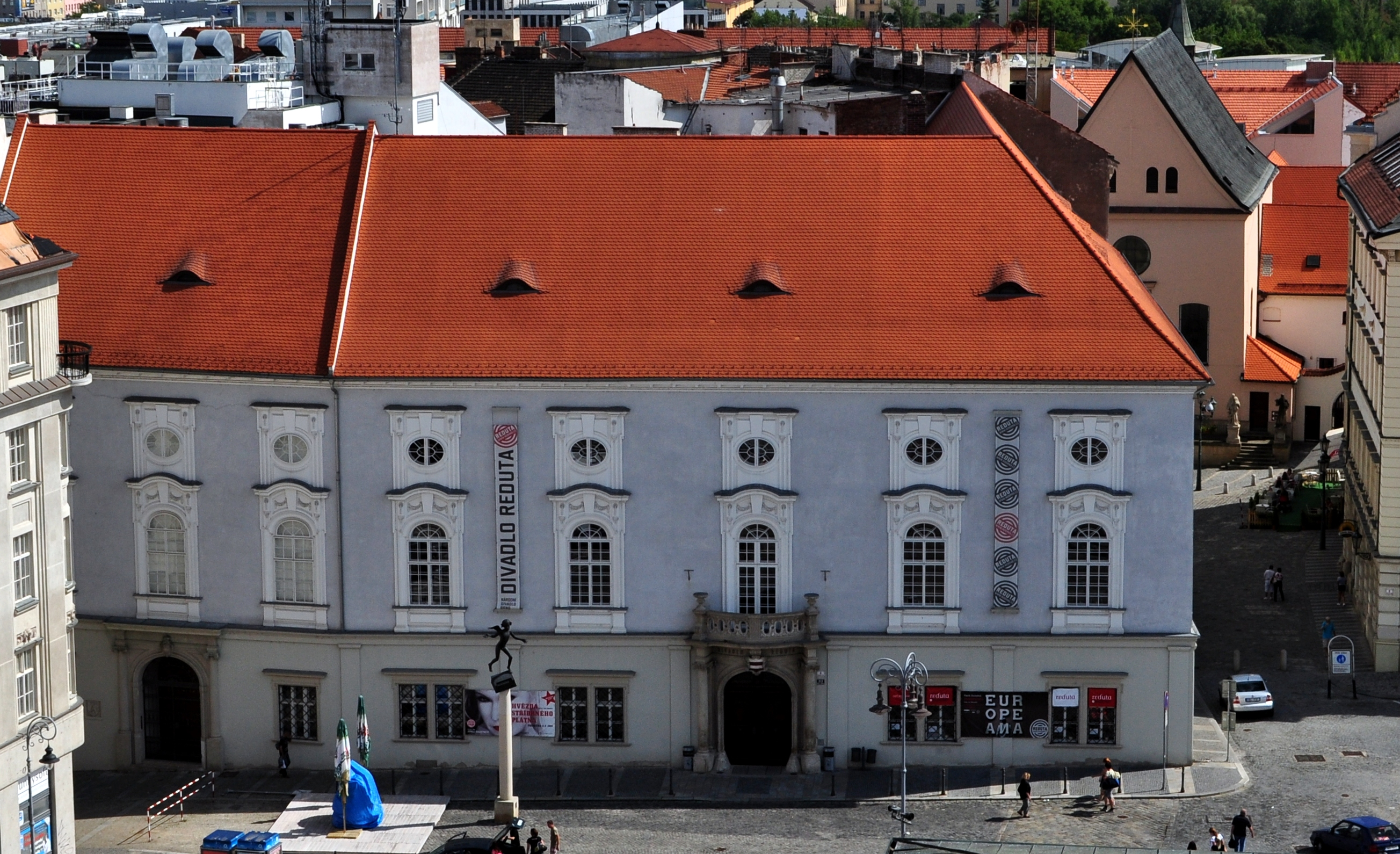
Reduta Theatre

Among the landmarks of the square are Dietrichstein Palace from the early 17th century, which is the seat of the Moravské zemské muzeum (Moravian Museum), and the building of the Reduta Theatre from 1608, which is the oldest theatre building in Central Europe. Under the square is an underground labyrinth of passages and cellars from the Middle Ages.

=== Parnassus Fountain ===
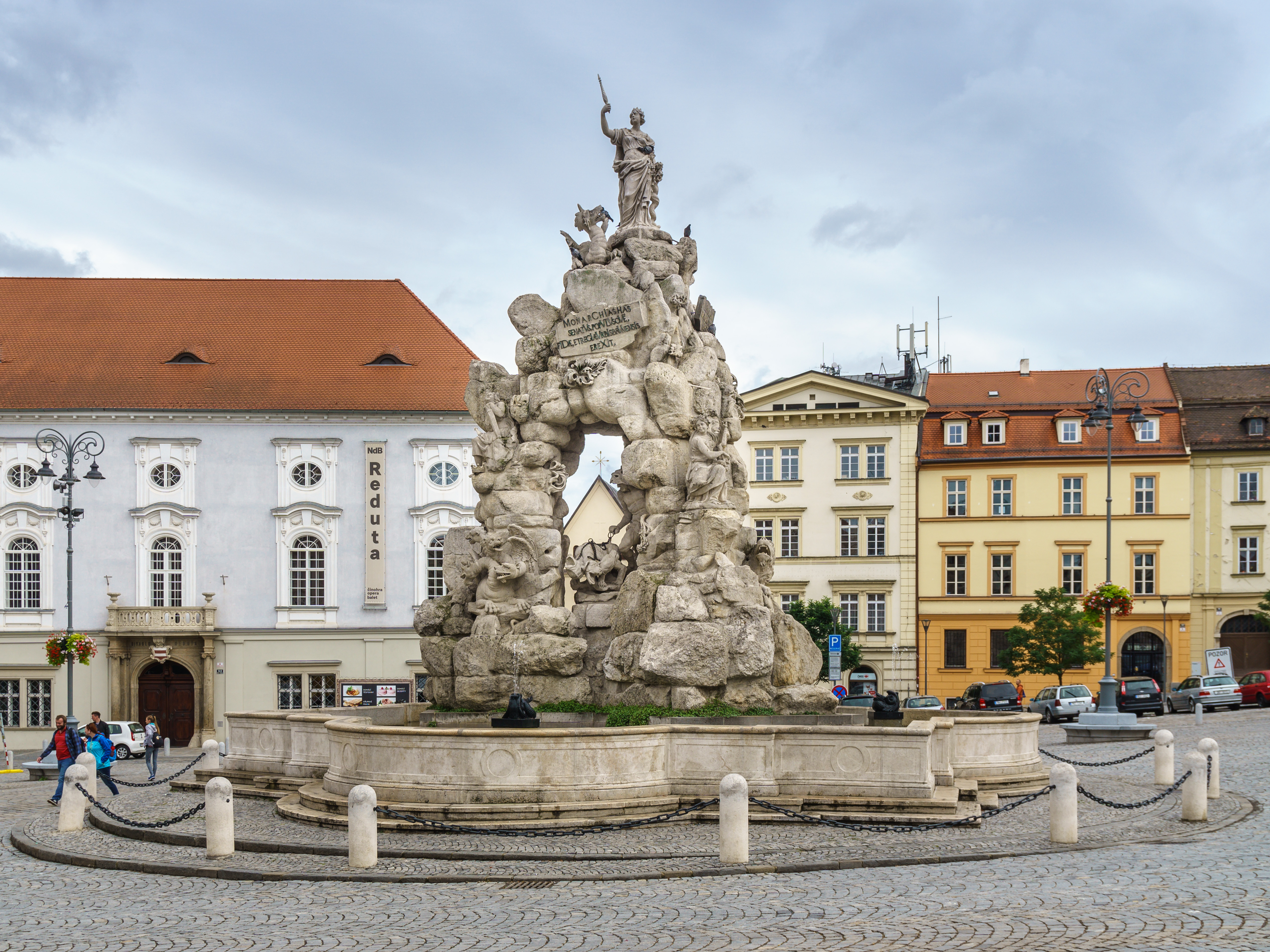
Parnassus Fountain

In the middle of the square is the Parnassus Fountain, named after Mount Parnassus. It is a large Baroque fountain created in 1690–1695, when it replaced an older Renaissance fountain from 1597. It has a six-pointed star plan and is decorated with many allegorical figures and mythical animals. In the middle of the fountain is a rocky cliff on top of which is an allegorical statue of Europa. In the cliff is a cave with Heracles. Allegorical figures on the outside of the cave represent Babylonia, Persia and Greece. The fountain was designed by Johann Bernhard Fischer von Erlach and created by Tobias Kracker and Anton Riga.

== The market ==
Zelný trh has been in use since 1190, earlier than the city was established. Originally, it was a general market. Later, it specialised in vegetables and fruits. Since 1255, it was known by the Latin forum superius and a century later by 1340, it was called Krautmarkt – Zelný trh. It has operated for 850 years in one place and for 700 years under the name Zelný trh. It was never interrupted, continuing through the communist time when all other private enterprise was outlawed.

The market is the largest in Brno and the oldest continuously operating market with vegetables and plants in Central Europe. The market contains many shops that sell vegetables, fruit, meat (now rabbits only and smoked), fish (in Christmas time only), flowers, plants, seeds, seedlings, breads (bakery products), Moravian kolach, spices, nuts, eggs, cheese, and Moravian traditional spices and herbs items. The market also has many small restaurants and street-food stalls.

== Labyrinth under Zelný trh ==
Under the square is a system of underground corridors and cellars. The cellars originally served for food storage, beer brewing, maturing of wine in barrels, and as shelter in times of war. They were founded in the Middle Ages, but most of them dates back to the Baroque era. The cellars were not all connected together until 2009 when they underwent a major reconstruction, and since 2011 they are opened public. They are 6 to 8 metres under the surface.

== Gallery ==
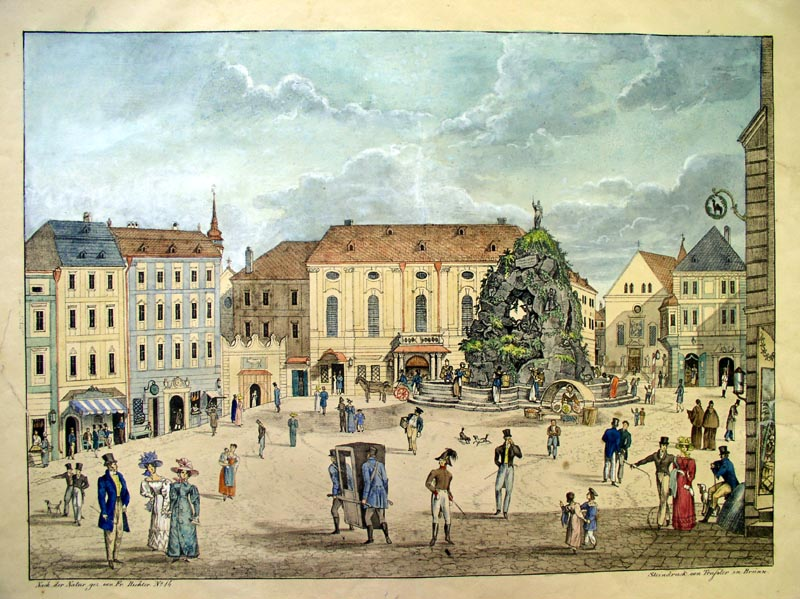
Zelný trh in 1827

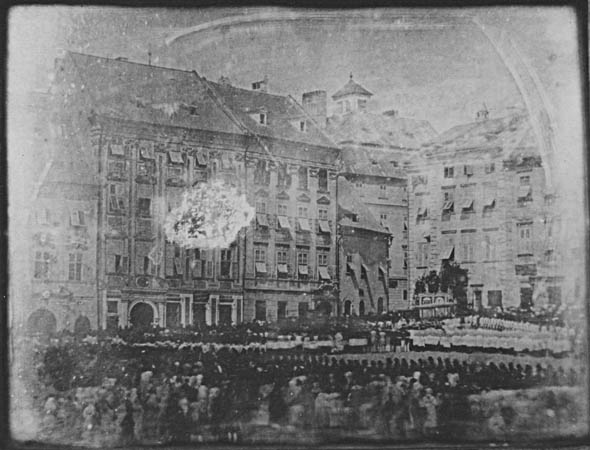
The daguerreotype of Zelný trh from 1841

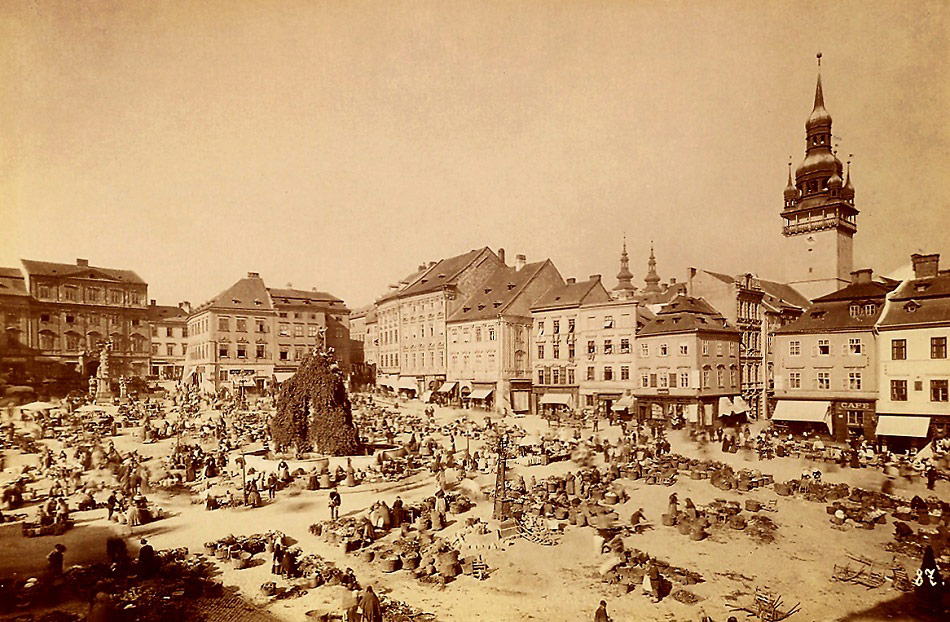
Zelný trh in 1894

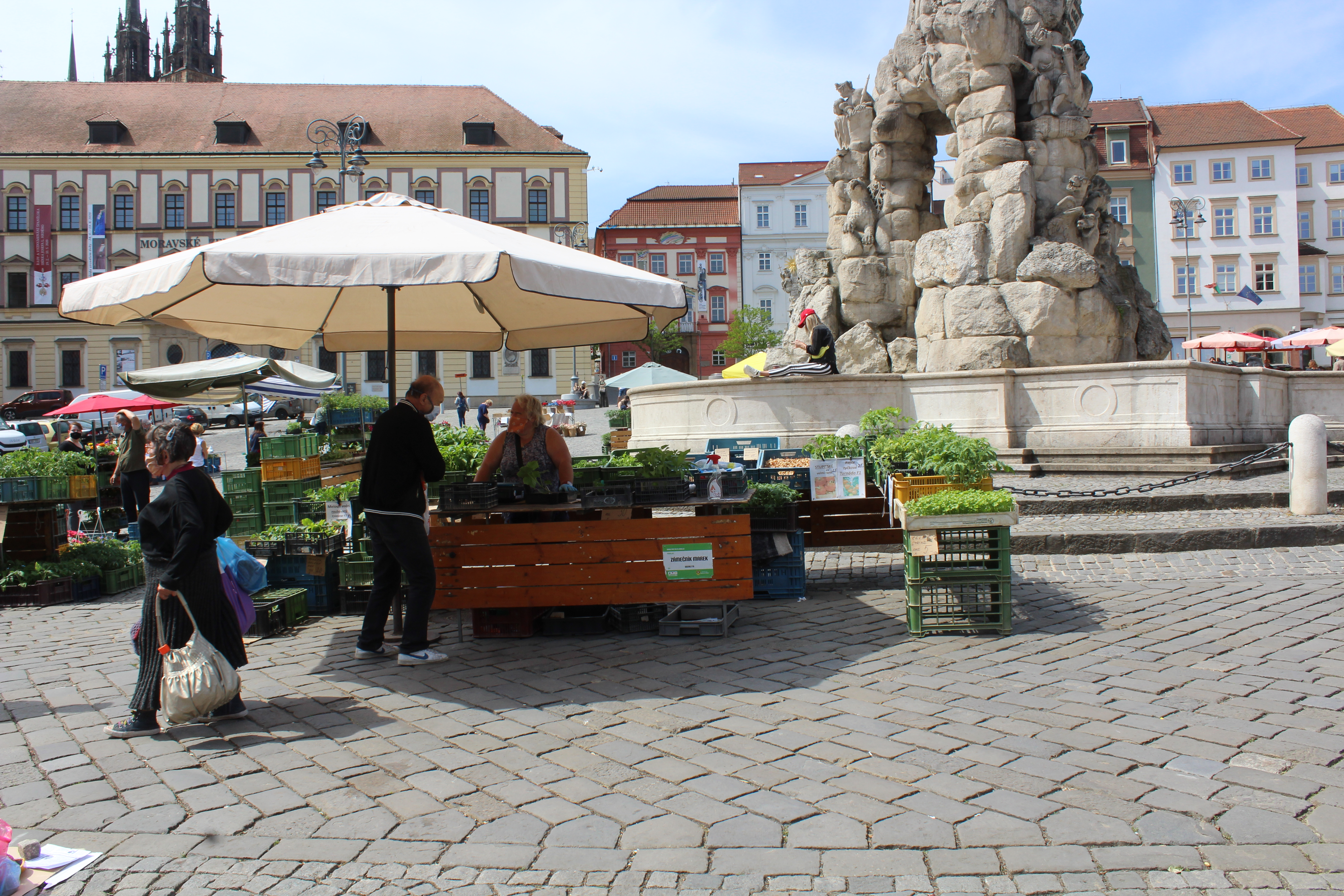
The market in April 2020

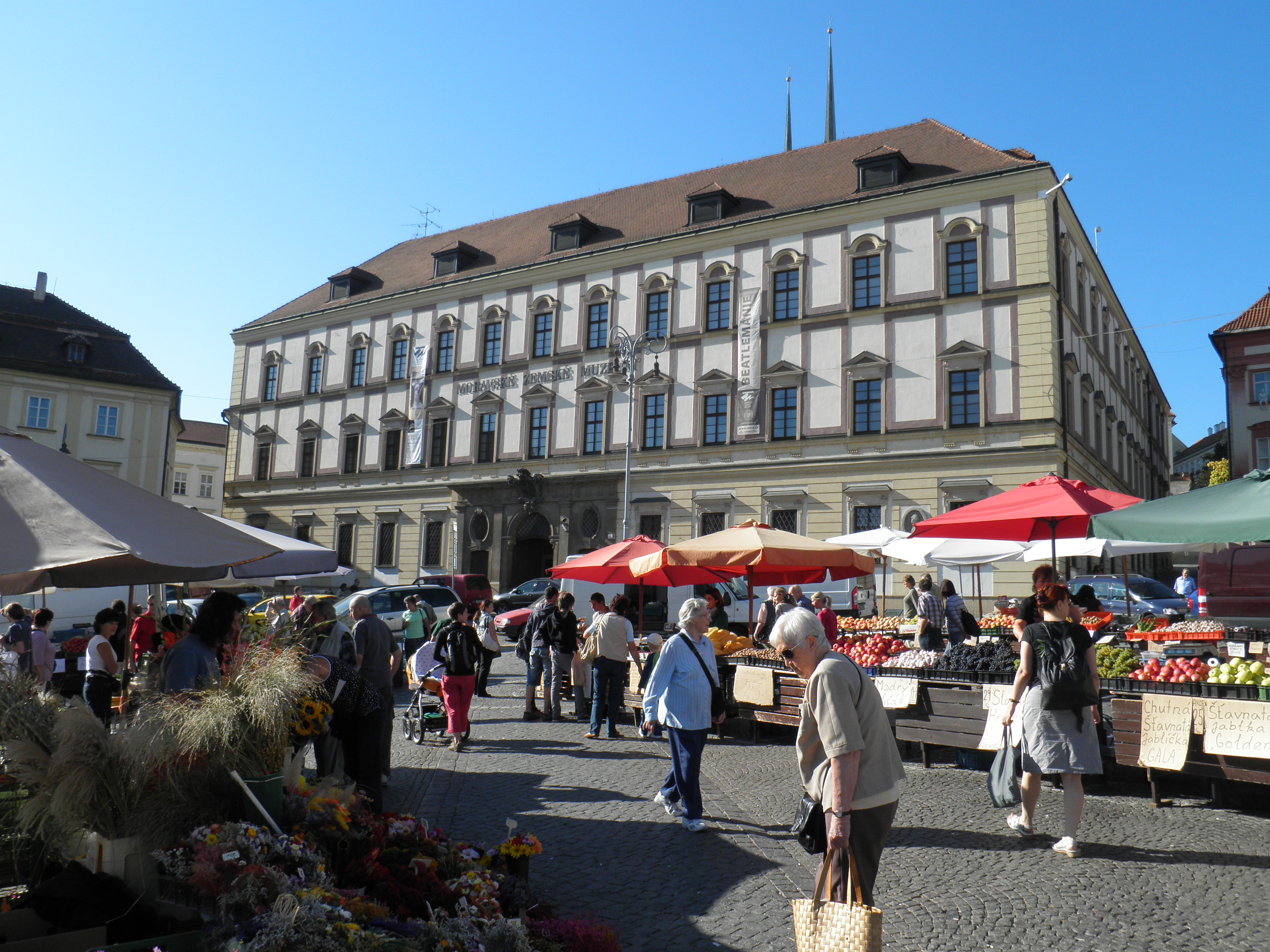
Stalls in front of the Moravian Museum

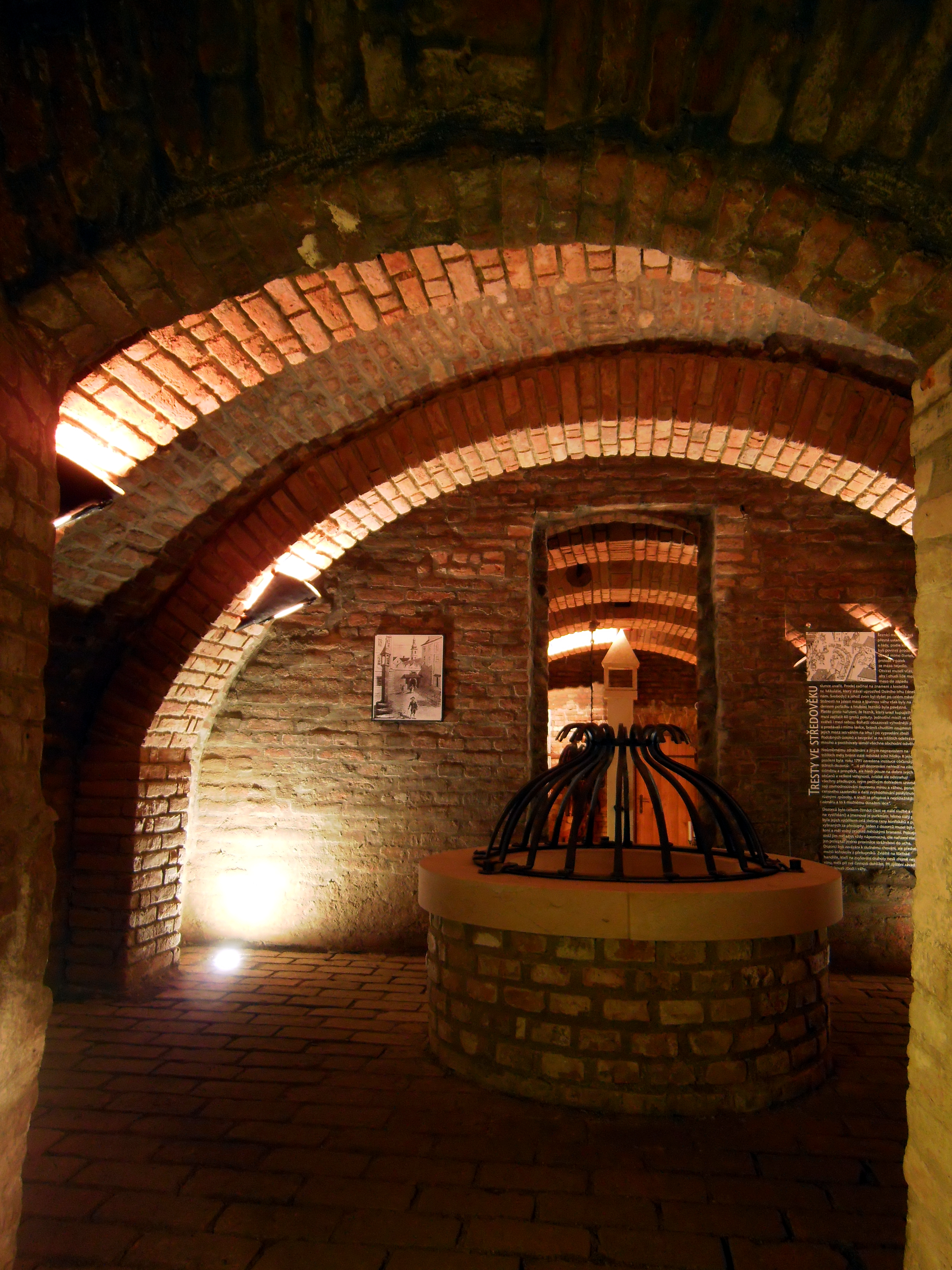
The underground

== See also ==
- Moravian cuisine
- Franz von Dietrichstein
