= Reduta Theatre =

Theatre in Brno, Czech Republic

- Divadlo Reduta
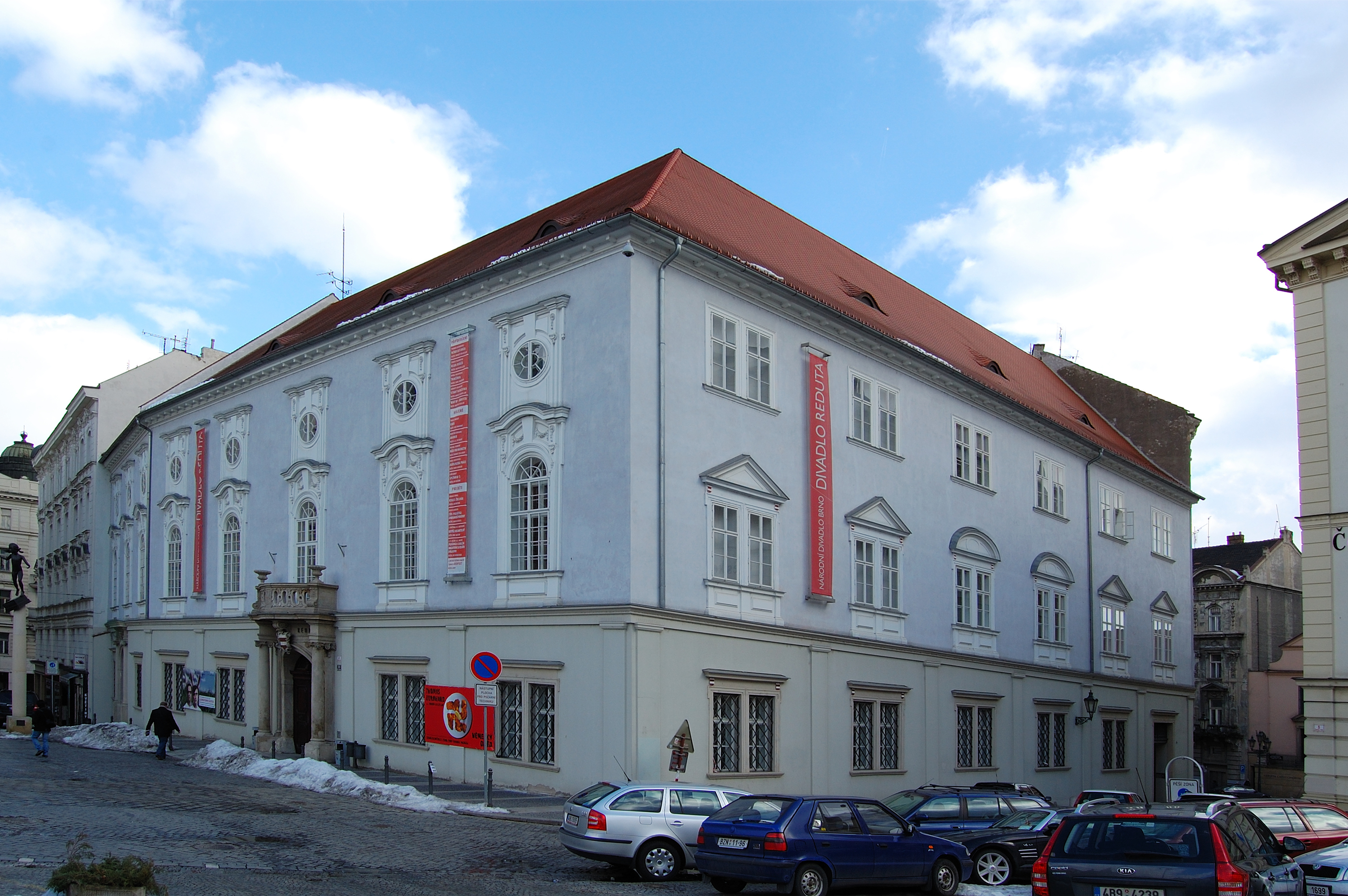
- The Reduta Theatre building
- Interactive map of Reduta Theatre
- Address: Zelný trh 313; Brno; Czech Republic
- Coordinates: 49°11′31.67″N 16°36′34.59″E

Construction
- Opened: 1608

Website
- Official website

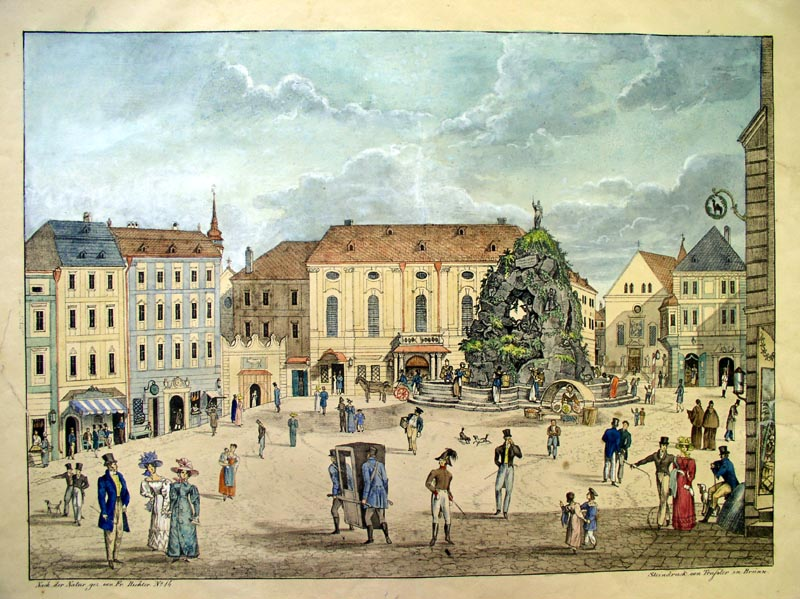
The Reduta Theatre (center) in an 1827 lithograph

The Reduta Theatre (Czech: Divadlo Reduta) is a theatre in Brno, Czech Republic. It was built on the city's oldest square (Zelný trh) and began its life in Renaissance times as the Taverna (Tavern) Theatre. In 1767, Wolfgang Amadeus Mozart performed with his sister in a concert there. It is now part of the National Theatre in Brno. The building, which was first mentioned in 1608, is the oldest theatre building in Central Europe.

== History ==
At the beginning of the 17th century, Brno city council purchased and remodelled a complex of medieval houses located on Zelný trh. One of the houses in the block, the Liechtenstein house, was redesigned as a tavern in 1605. The tavern was extended with assembly rooms for holding ceremonies and receptions, and in 1634, another house was integrated into the main building. The new hall served as a place for occasional performances by travelling theatrical companies. In the 1730s, the building was remodelled again with the addition of a new theater and ballroom. Known in the 18th century as the Taverna Theatre (or Theater in der Taffern to the German-speaking inhabitants of the city), it served as a venue for theatrical performances presented mainly in German and Italian.

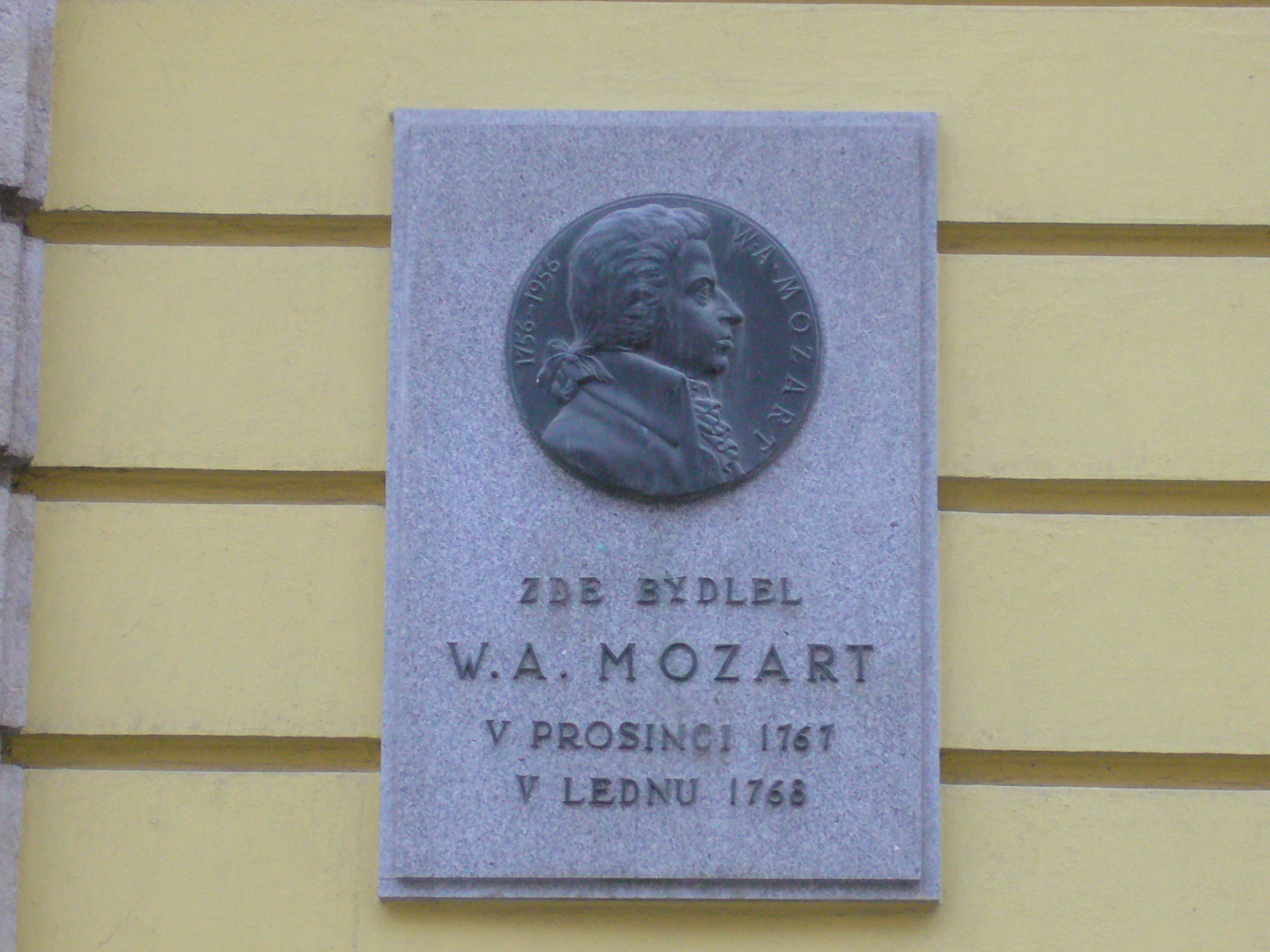
Plaque at the Schrattenbach Palace in Kobližná Street, Brno, commemorating Mozart's visit to the city

In October 1767, a smallpox epidemic forced Leopold Mozart and his children Wolfgang and Nannerl to escape from Vienna and accept shelter offered by the brother of their patron, Salzburg Archbishop Sigismund von Schrattenbach. On 25 October, Count František Antonín Schrattenbach met with the Mozart family in Brno. He immediately began planning a performance for Wolfgang and Nannerl. However, Leopold Mozart decided to continue travelling, and the family went on to Olomouc. Unfortunately, the epidemic affected young Wolfgang, and they had to stay in Olomouc until his recovery. On 24 December, they came back to Brno and spent Christmas there. On 30 December 1767, the child prodigies performed in the Taverna Theatre. According to a diary entry by Aurelius Augustin, provost of the monastery in Šternberk:

"... a Salzburg boy of eleven years and his sister of fifteen years, accompanied on various instruments by inhabitants of Brno, excited everyone's imagination; but he [young Wolfgang] could not endure the trumpets, because they were incapable of playing in tune with one another."

On the other hand, Vice-Kapellmeister Leopold Mozart was fully satisfied with the orchestra performance. On 9 January 1768, the family headed back to Vienna.

After a series of extensive fires in 1785 and 1786, the city council decided to rebuild the theatre in the neoclassical architectural style, with a new two-story main hall. The reconstructed theatre, now named the Reduta Theatre, presented mainly German plays, with performances in Czech held only infrequently. The last devastating fire in 1870 caused the theatre to close again, after which the building was used as the city market hall. In 1918, following the establishment of the new Czechoslovak state, the activities of the theatre were again restored. In the 1950s, the building was redesigned according to the plans of architects Bohuslav and Kamil Fuchs. Up to the 1990s, the theatre served as a stage for Czech operettas.

The last reconstruction was completed in 2005. The project was awarded the Grand Prix in a competition held by the Czech Chamber of Architects. As of 2010, the theatre is a part of the National Theatre in Brno. Reduta has no permanent ensemble. The theatre regularly invites various artists and ensembles from the Czech Republic and Slovakia for guest performances.

== Sources ==
- Erhartová, Olga (2005). Mozart a Brno (in Czech). Brno: Doplněk. ISBN 80-7239-188-7.
- Warrack, John Hamilton and West, Ewan (eds), "Brno", The Concise Oxford Dictionary of Opera, 3rd Edition, Oxford University Press, 1996, P. 61. ISBN 0-19-280028-0
- Zaslaw, Neal, Mozart's Symphonies: Context, performance practice, reception, Oxford University Press, 1991. ISBN 0-19-816286-3
