= History of Lafayette, Louisiana =

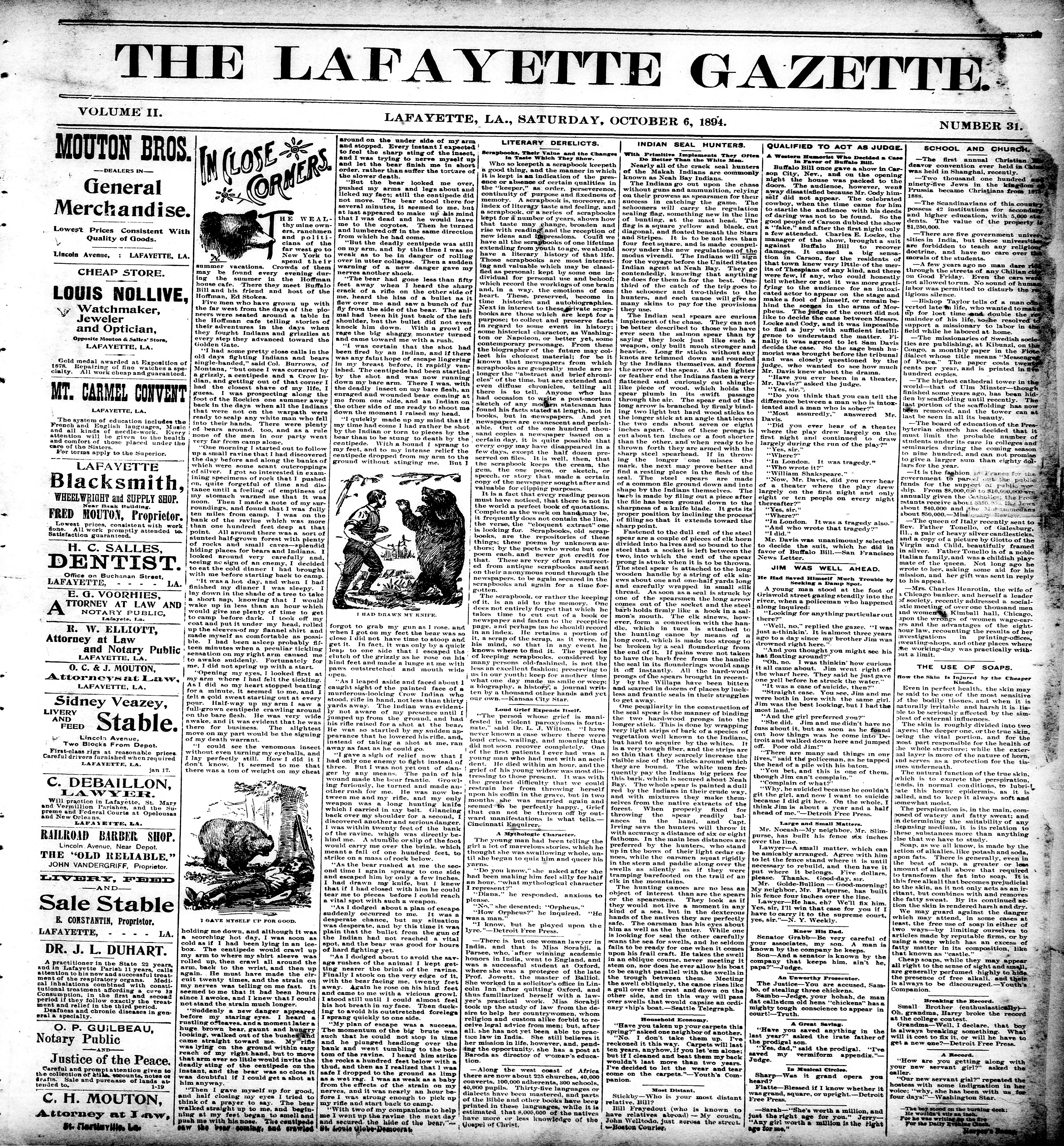
Lafayette Gazette 4 Oct 1894

Lafayette, Louisiana, and the surrounding area is a mix of American Indian, African American, English, French and Spanish culture. The area is situated in the region known as South Central Louisiana. The Vermilion River runs through the city. Today, the city and parish are at the heart of Acadiana.

== Early history ==
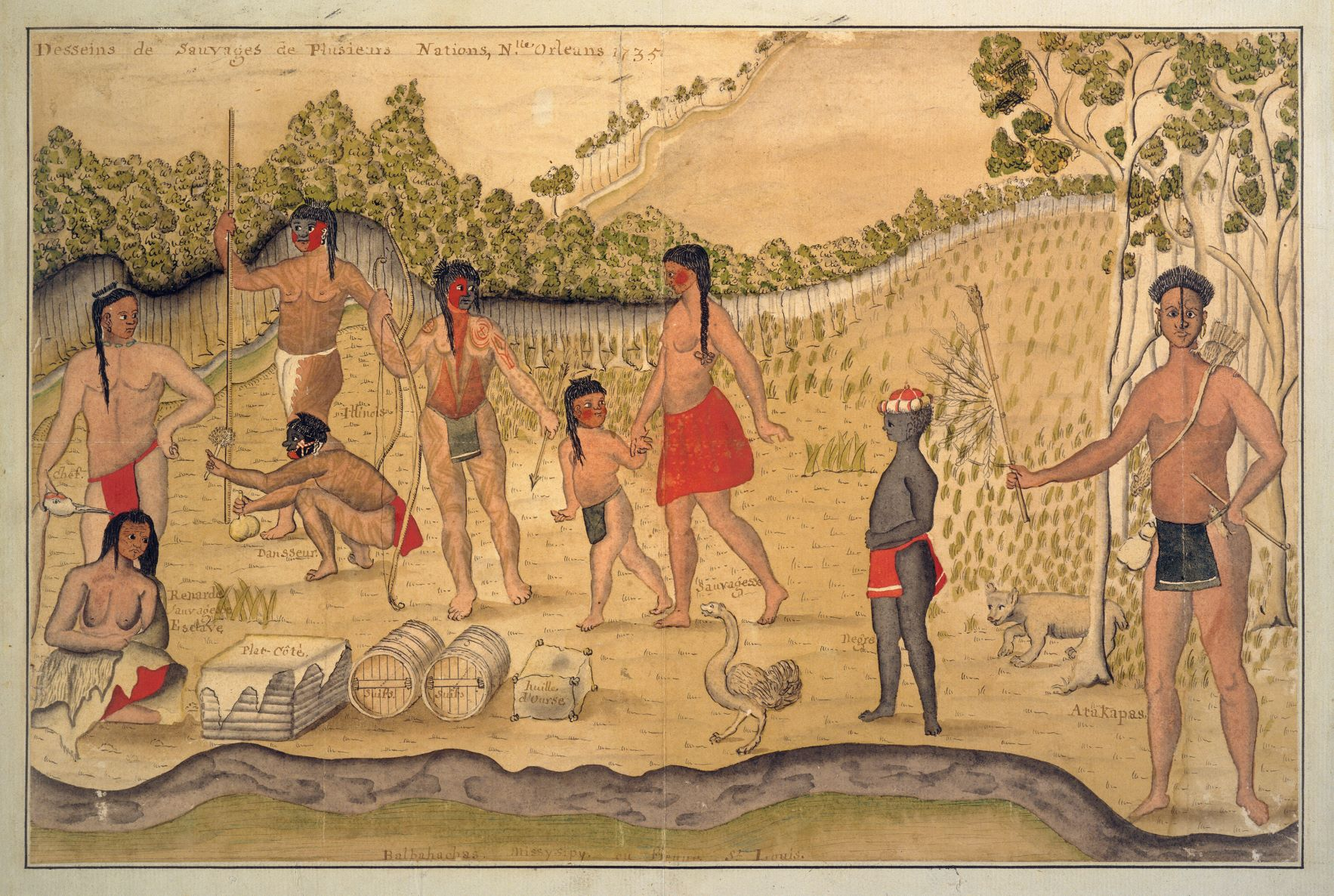
Drawing of Atakapa Indians from 1735

The earliest settlers in the area were Atakapa Native American tribespeople. Several burial mounds exist along the Vermilion and Bayou Teche.

== Acadian Settlement ==
The earliest records label the area as the Atakapa and Opelousas districts named after the local Native tribes. Before 1765, few Europeans settled in the area, mostly trappers and smugglers. By 1765, Acadians forcibly removed from Nova Scotia by the British expulsion were arriving in New Orleans, and the Spanish territorial governor began settling them in the Lafayette area at St. Martinville and Opelousas. Both French and Spanish officials granted lands freely along the bayous Carencro and Vermilion. Generally, such grants were the size of 6–8 arpents along the stream with a depth of 40 arpents. Two of the earliest settlers were Andrew Martin, Jean and Marin Mouton. It was only when Louisiana Governor William C. C. Claiborne created the counties of the Orleans Territory in 1805 that Attakapas County existed.

== Founding of Vermilionville ==
By 1812, the Attakapas Country was split into the St. Martin parish and the St. Mary parish. The original village which would become Lafayette, was laid out by Jean Mouton and his surveyor, John Dinsmore, Jr. in 1821 and was given the name "St. Jean du Vermilionville". Later, the name would be shortened to "Vermilionville". The boundaries were defined in an 1836 charter and later expanded in the 1869 charter.

In 1804, Alexandre Mouton, the son of founder Jean, was born in Lafayette and would later become a U.S. Senator and, from 1843 to 1846, Governor of Louisiana.

On April 17, 1863, the Battle of Vermilion Bayou was fought, the third battle in a series of running battles between Union Major General Nathaniel Prentice Banks and Confederate Major General Richard Taylor.

== Establishment of Lafayette ==
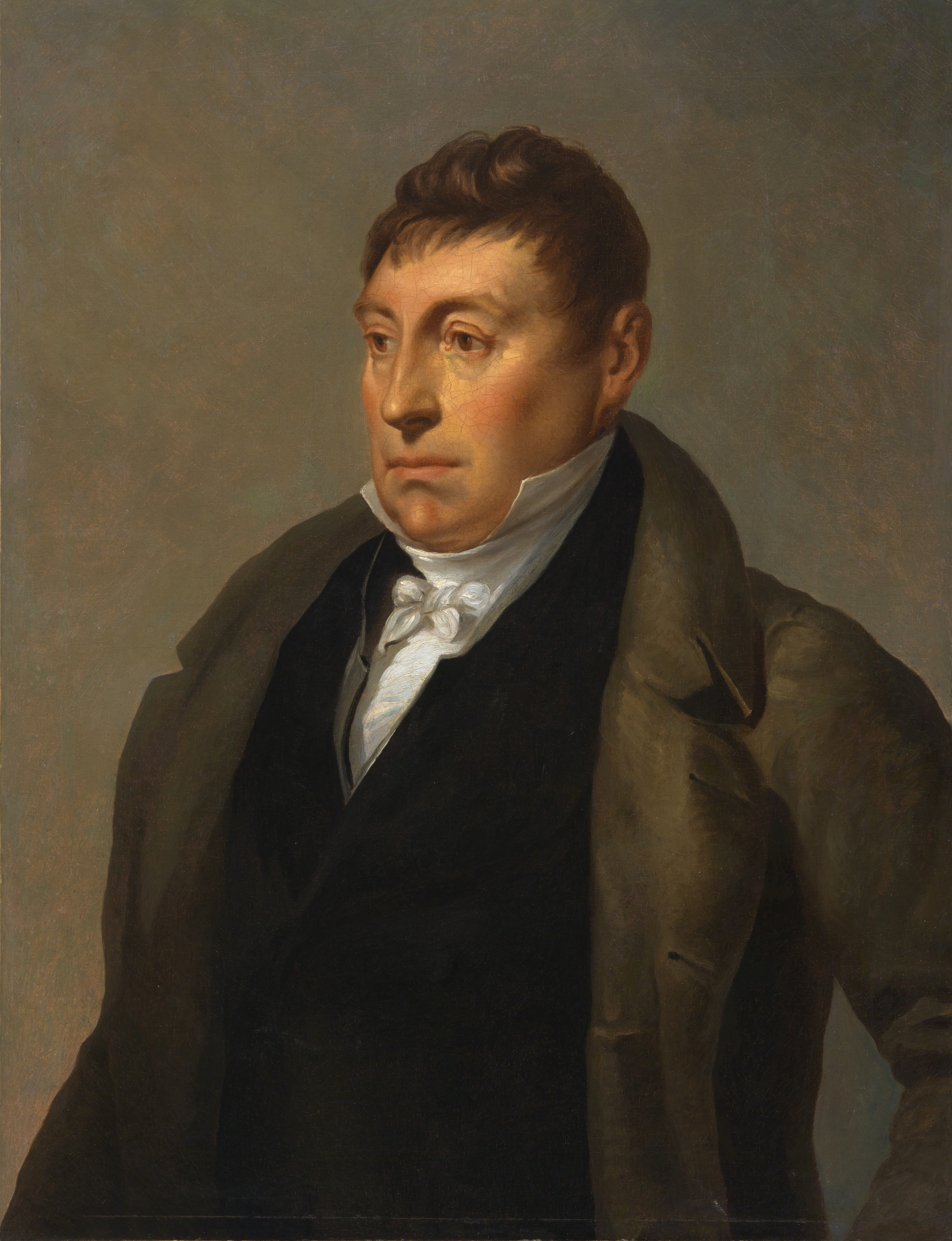
The Marquis de Lafayette in 1825, during his tour of the United States

In 1823, the Louisiana legislature divided St. Martin Parish and created Lafayette Parish. The parish name Lafayette was chosen because of the enthusiasm around General Lafayette's visit to the United States. However, the city's name remained Vermilionville because the name "Lafayette" had already been given to a suburb of New Orleans. Eventually, in 1884, the suburb was incorporated into New Orleans, and Vermilionville became Lafayette.
