= List of photography periodicals =

List of periodicals about photography

The following is a list of magazines and journals covering photography, photographic technologies, and photographic techniques.

List of photography periodicals
Title	ISSN	Publisher	Language	Country	Frequency	Publication range	Status	Document type
125			English	United Kingdom	Semiannually	2003–2013	Ceased	Magazine
8 Magazine		Foto8	English	United Kingdom	Semiannually	2001–2012	Ceased	Magazine
All About Photo (AAP Magazine)		Sandrine Hermand-Grisel	English		Monthly	2013– (online platform); 2018– (printed magazine)	Current	Magazine (print, digital), Online
Amateur Photographer	0002-6840	Hazell, Watson and Viney; TI Media; Future plc; Kelsey Media	English	United Kingdom	Fortnightly	1884–	Current	Magazine, Online
The Amateur Photographer's Weekly		American Photographic Pub. Co.	English	US	Weekly	1912–1919	Ceased (absorbed into American Photography)	Magazine
The American Journal of Photography		Seely & Garbanati	English	US		1858–1900	Ceased (absorbed into The Photo Era)	Magazine
American Amateur Photographer	2694-6386	American Photographic Pub. Co.	English	US	Monthly	1889–1906	Ceased (absorbed into American Photography)	Magazine
American Photo		Bonnier	English	US	Monthly	1990–2015	Ceased (absorbed into Popular Photography)	Magazine
American Photographer		CBS	English	US	Monthly	1978–1990	Ceased (renamed to American Photo in 1990)	Magazine
American Photography	0097-577X	American Photographic Publishing Co.	English	US	Monthly	1907–1953	Ceased (sold to CBS, merged into Popular Photography)	Magazine
Anthony's Photographic Bulletin			English	US		1870–	Ceased (merged into American Photography	Magazine
Aperture		Aperture Foundation	English	US	Quarterly	1952–	Current	Magazine
Asahi Camera		Asahi Shinbun-sha	Japanese	Japan	Monthly	1926–2020	Ceased	Magazine
Australasian Photographic Review		Baker & Rouse; Kodak (Australasia)	English	Australia	monthly	1895–1903	Renamed to Australasian Photographic Review of Reviews	Magazine
Australasian Photographic Review of Reviews		Baker & Rouse; Kodak (Australasia)	English	Australia	monthly	1894–1895	Renamed from Australasian Photographic Review of Reviews; renamed to Australasian Photographic Review	Magazine
Australasian Photo-Review		Baker & Rouse; Kodak (Australasia)	English	Australia	monthly	1903–1956	Renamed from Australasian Photographic Review; Ceased	Magazine
Australian Camera		Nextmedia; Future plc	English	Australia	Bimonthly	1979–		Magazine, Online
Australian Photography			English	Australia	Monthly	1950–	Current	Magazine, Online
B&W Minimalism			English		Quarterly		Current	Magazine (print, digital)
The Beacon			English	US	Monthly	1889–1892	Ceased (renamed to Photo-Beacon)	Magazine
Better Photography		Better Photography	English	Australia	Quarterly	1995–		Magazine
Better Photography		Network18 Media & Investments Ltd.	English	India	Monthly	1997–		Magazine
Black & White Enthusiast		David Bigwood	English	Australia	Bimonthly	1998–2004	Renamed to Silvershotz, moved to UK	Magazine
Black & White Magazine (B&W)		Ross Periodicals	English	US	Monthly (initially quarterly, then bimonthly)	1999–	Current	Magazine
Black+White (or Not Only Black+White)		Studio Magazines Pty	English	Australia	Bimonthly	1992–2007	Ceased	Magazine
Black+White Photography		GMC Publications	English	United Kingdom	Monthly		Current	Magazine
Blind Spot		Photo-Based Art, Inc.	English	US		1992–2014	Ceased	Magazine
British Journal of Photography	0007-1196	1854 Media	English	United Kingdom	Monthly	1854–	Current	Magazine
Les Cahiers des 30 × 40	1278-4281	Les 30 × 40	French	France	Quarterly	1976–1980	Ceased	Magazine
Camera	0008-2074	C. J. Bucher; Ringier	German, English, French	Switzerland	Monthly	1922–1981	Ceased	Magazine
Camera 35		Sahadi Publications (?); Popular Publications International	English	US		1957–1982	Ceased	Magazine
Camera and Dark Room		New York Society of Amateur Photographers	English	US		1898–1906	Ceased (absorbed in American Photography	Magazine
Camera & Dark Room						–1995	Ceased	Magazine
Camera and Travel		American Express	English	US	Monthly	1969–1971	Ceased (renamed to Travel + Leisure, no longer photography oriented)	Magazine
Camera Art (カメラアート, Kamera Āto)		Camera Art–sha (カメラアート社)	Japanese	Japan	Monthly	1935–1940	Ceased	Magazine
Camera Arts		Ziff-Davis Publishing; American Photographer (CBS)	English	US	Bimonthly	1980–1983	Ceased	Magazine
Camera Craft		Photographer's Association of California	English	US	Monthly	1900–1942	Ceased (absorbed in American Photography)	Magazine
Camera Mainichi		Mainichi Shinbun-sha	Japanese	Japan	Monthly	1954–1985	Ceased	Magazine
Camera Notes		Camera Club of New York	English	US	Quarterly	1897–1903	Ceased (merged into American Photography)	Magazine
Camera Obscura			English					
Camera Owner		Davpet Ltd; Coo Press	English	United Kingdom	Bimonthly	1964–1968	Renamed to Creative Camera	Magazine
Camera Work		Alfred Stieglitz	English	US	Quarterly	1903–1917	Ceased	Magazine
Camerawork	0308-1672	Half Moon Photography Workshop	English	United Kingdom	Bimonthly	1976–1985	Ceased	Magazine
Canadian Camera	1206-3401	Canadian Association for Photographic Art	English	Canada	Quarterly		Current	Magazine
Capture		Yaffa Media	English	Australia	Semiannual	1963–	Current	Magazine (print, digital), Online
Click			English	US	Bimonthly (2012–2020); Quarterly (2021–)	2012–	Current	Magazine; Online-only
Conscientious Photography		Jörg M. Colberg	English	Netherlands	Weekly	2002–	Current	Online
Creative Camera		Coo Press	English	United Kingdom	Bimonthly	1968–2000	Renamed from Camera Owner; renamed to DPICT	Magazine
Darkroom & Creative Camera Techniques		Preston Publications	English		Bimonthly	1980– (?)	Ceased (renamed to Photo Technique in 1996)	Magazine
Darkroom Photography							Renamed to Camera & Darkroom	Magazine
Digital Camera		Future plc	English	United Kingdom	Monthly	2003–	Current	Magazine, Online
Digital Camera World		Future plc	English	United Kingdom	Daily	2017–	Current	Magazine, Online
Digital Photo		Bebop Channel Corporation	English		Monthly	–2023	Ceased	Magazine; Online
Digital Photographer		Imagine Publishing; Future plc	English	United Kingdom	Monthly	2003–2025	Ceased	Magazine
Digital Photo Pro		Bebop Channel Corporation	English		Monthly	–2023	Ceased	Magazine; Online
Digital SLR Photography		Dennis Publishing; Raspberry Pi Ltd	English	United Kingdom	Monthly	-2021	Ceased	Magazine
D-Photo	1176-6948	Parkside Media; Federico Monsalve Ltd.	English	New Zealand	Quarterly	2004–2023(?) (Note: D-Photo's website's most recent articles/features are Summer 2023)	Ceased (?)	Magazine
DPICT		Coo Press	English	United Kingdom	Bimonthly	2000–2001	Renamed from Creative Camera; Ceased	Magazine
Elements		OLI Publishing	English		Monthly	2020–	Current	Magazine (digital only)
EOS Magazine		Robert Scott Publishing	English	United Kingdom	Quarterly		Current	Magazine (print, digital)
Foam Magazine		Foam Fotografiemuseum Amsterdam	English	Netherlands	Semiannually	2002–	Current	Magazine
Focus		Focus Fine Art LLC	English	US	Bimonthly	2004–	Current	Magazine
Fotoflash Journal	1200-9598		English	Canada			Renamed or merged into Canadian Camera?	Journal
Fotomag			Norwegian	Norway	Monthly			Magazine, online
Frames		T. T. Photography	English	United Kingdom	Quarterly (print), Monthly (digital companion)		Current	Magazine, digital, online
F-Stop Magazine			English		Bimonthly	2003–	Current	Online
Imaging Resource		Madadvor Media; BeBop Channel	English	US	Weekly/Daily	1998–2023		Online only
The Imaging Science Journal	1368-2199	Taylor & Francis	English	United Kingdom	Bimonthly	1953–	Current	Journal, Online
I-MAG Photography	1908-3599		English	Philippines			Ceased	Magazine
International Print Exhibition		Royal Photographic Society	English	United Kingdom	Annual			Catalog
Jeune Photographie		Les 30 × 40	French	France	Biweekly	1952–1976	Ceased	Magazine
LensWork		Brooks Jensen	English	US	Quarterly (initially monthly, later bimonthly)	1993–	Current	Magazine
LFI – Leica Fotographie International		LFI Photographie GmbH	English, German	Germany	Semiquarterly (8 yearly)	1949–	Current	Magazine (print, digital)
Light Vision		Light Quest Publications	English	Australia	bimonthly	1977–1978	Ceased	Magazine
M Magazine		LFI Photographie GmbH	English, German	Germany	Semiannual	2014–2016–	Ceased	Magazine (print, digital)
Medium Format		OLI Publishing	English		Monthly	2018–	Current	Magazine (digital only)
Minicam: The Miniature Camera Monthly		Automobile Digest Publishing Company	English	US	Monthly	1937–1949	Renamed to Minicam Photography 1940, then Modern Photography 1949	Magazine
Modern Photography	0026-8240	Photographic Publishing Company	English	US	Monthly	1949–1989	Ceased (merged into Popular Photography)	Magazine
Modern Photography			English	Taiwan		1976		Magazine
Monovisions			English				Current	Online
National Wildlife	0028-0402	National Wildlife Federation	English	US	Quarterly	1962–	Current	Magazine
Nature Photographer			English	US	Triannual			Magazine, Online
Nature's Best Photography		Steven B. Freligh	English	US	Semiannual	1995–	Current	Magazine
Nippon Camera		Nippon Camera-sha	Japanese	Japan	Bimonthly (first year), Monthly	1950–2021	Ceased	Magazine
N-Photo: The Nikon Magazine		Future plc	English	United Kingdom	Monthly	2011–2024	Ceased	Magazine
The Online Photographer		Mike Johnston	English	US	Daily	2005–	Current	Online / Blog
Outdoor Photographer	0890-5304	Madavor Media; BeBop Channel Corporation	English	US	Monthly	1985–2023	Current	Magazine; Online
Outdoor Photography		GMC Publications	English	United Kingdom	Monthly	2000-	Current	Magazine; Online
Outdoor Photography Canada		Sunlight Media	English	Canada	Monthly	2008–2019		Magazine; Online
Photo-Beacon			English	US	Monthly	1893–1907	Ceased (merged into American Photography)	Magazine
PhotoComment		Tristan Donovan Hall	US	South Africa			Ceased	Magazine
Photo Craft			English	US	Monthly	1918–1920	Ceased (merged into American Photography)	Magazine
Photocraft		US Camera Publications	English	US	Quarterly			Magazine
photoED			English	Canada	Semiannually	2001–	Current	Magazine, Online
Photo-Era: The Journal of American Photography		Photo Era Co., Boston	English	US	Monthly	1898–1932	Ceased (absorbed by American Photography)	Magazine
Photofile		Australian Centre for Photography	English	Australia	Triannual, then Semiannual	1983–2010 (print); 2010–2013 (digital only); 2013–2020 (print and online)	Ceased	Journal, Online
The Photogram		Dawbarn and Ward	English	United Kingdom, US	Monthly	1894–1906	Renamed to The Photographic Monthly	Magazine
The Photogram (newsletter)	1082-6874	Michigan Photographic Historical Society	English	US	Quarterly	1972–	Current	Society newsletter
Photograph		photograph	English	US	Bimonthly	1988–	Current, digital-only	Magazine
The Photographic Beacon			English	US	Monthly	1885–1889	Renamed to The Beacon	Magazine
The Photographic Journal	1468-8670	Royal Photographic Society	English	United Kingdom	Monthly	1853–	Current	Journal
The Photographic Monthly		Dawbarn and Ward	English	United Kingdom, US	Monthly	1906–1920	Renamed from The Photogram; Ceased	Magazine
The Photographic Times		Photographic Times Publishing Assn.	English	US		1871–	Ceased (merged in American Photography)	Magazine
Photographic Topics		Obrig Camera Company	English	US	Monthly	1902–1913	Ceased (absorbed into Popular Photography)	Magazine
photographies	1754-0763 (print); 1754-0771 (online)	Taylor & Francis	English		Triannual	2008–	Current	Journal
Photography Life		Nasim Mansurov	English	US	Weekly/Daily	2008–	Current	Online / Blog
Photography Monthly		Archant	English	United Kingdom	Monthly	2001–2014	Ceased	Magazine
Photography Week		MagazinesDirect.com (Future plc)	English	United Kingdom	Weekly		Ceased	Online only
Photo Life	0700-3021	Apex Publications	English	Canada	Bimonthly	1976–2021	Ceased	Magazine
The Photo-Miniature: A Monthly Magazine of Photographic Information		Tenant and Ward, New York	English	US	Monthly			Magazine
PhotoNews			English, French	Canada	Triannual	-2022		Magazine (print, digital), online
PhotoPlus: The Canon Magazine		Future plc	English	United Kingdom	Monthly	2007–2025	Ceased	Magazine
Photo Technique			English			1939?	Ceased	Magazine
Photo Techniques		Tinsley Preston	English			1996–2013	Ceased	Magazine
Photoworks		Photoworks	English	United Kingdom	Biannual	2003–2013	Renamed to Photoworks Annual	Magazine
Photoworks Annual		Photoworks	English	United Kingdom	Biannual	2013–2017	Ceased	Magazine
Popular Photography		F. R. Frapie, Boston	English	US	Monthly	1912–1917	Ceased (absorbed into American Photographer)	Magazine
Popular Photography		Ziff-Davis Publishing; Bonnier	English	US	Monthly	1937–2017	Ceased (sold, revived online in 2021)	Magazine
Popular Photography		Recurrent Ventures	English	US	Monthly	2021–2023	Ceased	Online
Practical Photography		EMAP; Bauer Media Group	English	United Kingdom	Monthly	1959–2020	Ceased	Magazine, Online
Practical Photoshop		Future plc	English	United Kingdom	Monthly		Ceased	Magazine
The Process Photogram		Dawborn & Ward Ltd.	English	United Kingdom	Monthly	1896–		Magazine
Professional Imagemaker		Society of Photographers	English	United Kingdom	Bimonthly		Current	Online
Professional Photo		So Smart Media	English	UK	Monthly		Current	Magazine, Online
Professional Photographer	1528-5286	Professional Photographers of America	English	US	Monthly	1907–	Current	Magazine (print, digital)
Professional Photographer	0144-509X		English	UK	Monthly	1982–2015	Ceased	Magazine
ProPhoto		Nextmedia; Future plc	English	Australia	Bimonthly	1937–		Magazine, Online
Provoke			Japanese	Japan	Semiannual / Irregular (only 3 issues published)	1968–1968	Ceased	Magazine
S Magazine		LFI Photographie GmbH	English, German	Germany	Irregular – Annual / Semiannual	2011–2018	Ceased	Magazine (print, digital)
Shots Magazine		Dan Price; Robert Owens; Russell John; Douglas Beasley	English	US	Quarterly	1986–	Current	Magazine, Online
Shutter		Salvatore Cincotta	English	US		2011–	Current (print ceased 2022; digital only)	Magazine
Shutter			Japanese	Japan				Magazine
Shutterbug	0895-321X	AVTech Media	English	US	Monthly	1973–2018	Ceased print; Current online	Magazine, Online
SilvergrainClassics		Silvergrain Publishing UG	English	Germany	Quarterly	2020–	Current (renamed from PhotoKlassik International, 2020)	Magazine
PhotoKlassik International		Silvergrain Publishing UG	English	Germany	Quarterly	2018–2020	Ceased (renamed to SilvergrainClassics)	Magazine
Silvershotz		Clive Waring-Flood	English	Australia	Bimonthly	2004–2014 (print); 2015–2019 (digital)	Ceased	Magazine, Online
Source	1369-2224	Photoworks North	English	Ireland	Quarterly	1992–	Current	Magazine, Online
Ten.8	0142-9663	Ten.8 Ltd.	English	United Kingdom	Quarterly	1979–1992	Ceased	Magazine
.tiff	2593-6816	Fotomuseum Antwerp		Belgium	Annual	2013–	Current	Magazine / Photobook
Trigger		Fotomuseum Antwerp	English	Belgium	Annual	2019–	Current	Magazine / Photobook
US Camera		US Camera Publishing Corp.	English	US	Monthly	1938–1964	Ceased (renamed to US Camera and Travel)	Magazine
US Camera and Travel		US Camera Publishing Corp.	English	US	Monthly	1964–1969	Ceased (renamed to Camera and Travel, sold to American Express)	Magazine
View Photography	1782-2270		English	Belgium			Ceased	
What Digital Camera		TI Media	English	US	Monthly	2003–2016	Ceased	Magazine, Online
Wilson's Photographic Magazine			English	US		1864–		Magazine
WOPOP: Working Papers on Photography		Euan McGillivray & Matthew Nickson	English	Australia	Irregular (approx. Semiannual)	1978–1983	Ceased	Journal
The Year's Photography		Royal Photographic Society	English	United Kingdom	Annual	1922–1961+	Ceased	Magazine
