= William Barnes Sr. =

American attorney and author

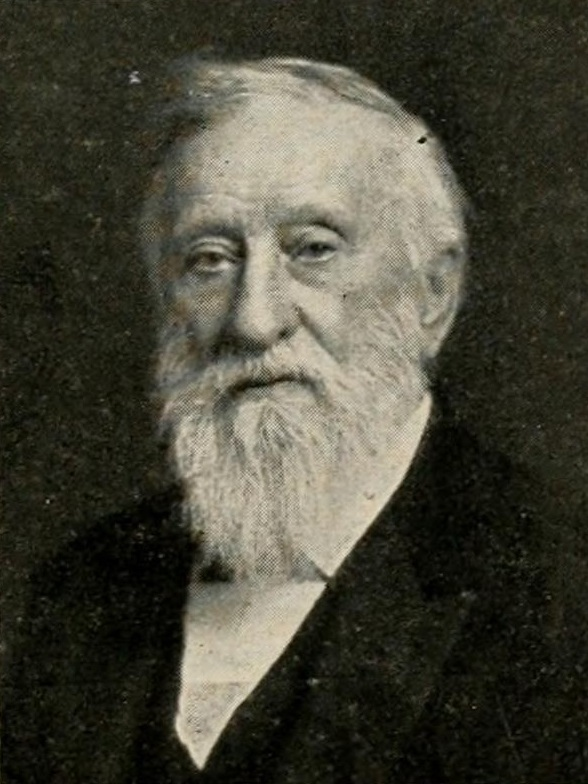
- From 1906's Golden Jubilee of the Republican Party

Superintendent of the New York State Department of Insurance
- In office January 12, 1860 – February 5, 1870
- Preceded by: None (position created)
- Succeeded by: George W. Miller

Personal details
- Born: May 25, 1824 Pompey, New York
- Died: February 22, 1913 (aged 88) Nantucket, Massachusetts
- Resting place: Albany Rural Cemetery, Menands, New York
- Party: Republican (from 1854)
- Other political affiliations: Democratic (before 1843); Liberty (1843–1848); Free Soil (1848–1854)
- Spouse(s): Emily Weed (m. 1849–1889, her death); Elizabeth Balmer Williams (m. 1891–1913, his death)
- Relations: Thurlow Weed (father-in-law)
- Children: 5 (including Catherine and William
- Education: Manlius Academy, Manlius, New York
- Profession: Attorney

William Barnes Sr. (May 25, 1824 – February 22, 1913) was an American attorney, author and government official from Albany, New York. He was an anti-slavery activist and a founder of the Republican Party. Barnes served as New York's first state Superintendent of Insurance, and held the office from 1860 to 1870. The works he authored included 1904's Semi-centennial of the Republican Party. He was the son-in-law of Thurlow Weed and the father of Catherine Weed Barnes and William Barnes Jr.

== Early life ==
William Barnes Sr. was born in Pompey, New York on May 25, 1824, a son of Orson Barnes and Eliza Phelps Barnes. He was educated in the schools of Pompey and attended Manlius Academy in Manlius, New York. Barnes taught school after graduating, and was one of the organizers of New York State's first formal professional development meetings for educators, annual institutes that took place in Baldwinsville in 1843 and 1844. While working as a teacher, he began studying law at the Baldwinsville firm of Minard & Stansbury. He later studied with Hillis & Pratt of Baldwinsville and James R. Lawrence of Syracuse. Barnes was admitted to the bar in 1846, and began to practice in Utica.

== Legal career ==
Barnes soon moved from Utica to Albany, where he practiced law as a partner in the firm of Hammond, King & Barnes, which also included Samuel H. Hammond. For several years in the 1850s, Barnes served as special counsel to the state Department of Banking, and his examination of several banks revealed them to be insolvent, so they were dissolved. Barnes was also appointed special counsel to represent the City of New York when members of the Astor family and several other wealthy residents attempted to overturn their property tax assessments. In 1855, he received a state appointment as a special commissioner to examine several insurance companies based in New York City. His investigation revealed them to be fraudulent, they were forced out of business, and the state legislature enacted several new laws designed to improve oversight of the industry.

One of the reforms passed by the legislature included the creation of a state Department of Insurance headed by a superintendent appointed to a five-year term. Barnes was named to the post in 1860, and was the first person to hold it. He was reappointed in 1865, and served until 1870. Barnes was credited with improving the overall condition of the insurance business in New York, and his influence was felt worldwide as the format and content of the annual reports his department produced were praised as exemplars in the insurance journals of several European countries, including England and Prussia.

== Political career ==
Originally a Democrat, in the 1840s Barnes became interested in the movement to abolish slavery. He joined the Liberty Party in 1843 and supported James G. Birney for president in 1844. In 1848 he joined the Free Soil Party and supported Martin Van Buren in that year's presidential election.

In 1854, Barnes took a leading role in creating the Republican Party as America's main anti-slavery party and was a delegate to its first New York state conventions, which were held in Saratoga Springs and Auburn. In 1855 he was the primary organizer of the party in Albany County. In 1856, Barnes was one of the creators of the Kansas Aid Society, which states opposed to slavery organized to provide assistance to anti-slavery advocates during the Bleeding Kansas controversy, and was one of the planners of the two Kansas Aid conventions that were held in 1856, one in Cleveland, and the other in Buffalo.

In 1872, Barnes was one of the U.S. delegates to the eighth session of the International Statistical Congress, which took place in Saint Petersburg, Russia. The International Statistical Congress was an ongoing effort by representatives from Russia, the United States, and several European countries to share methods for collecting, analyzing, and presenting data. Topics included agriculture, business, and education, and the participants aimed to enable more effective government action based on improved situational awareness. Barnes was a leading participant in the 1872 session's subcommittee on the insurance industry, and his efforts were recognized at the end of the event when Czar Alexander II personally presented Barnes a diamond ring as a token of his thanks.

In 1904, Barnes was a member of the thirteenth Universal Peace Congress, which took place in Boston. The peace congresses met periodically from the mid-1800s until the 1930s, and sought to prevent wars by identifying other ways to resolve international disputes. In 1907, he was a delegate to the World's Peace and Arbitration Convention.

== Career as author ==
In his later years, Barnes was a resident of Nantucket, Massachusetts, where he owned a house that had originally been built for Charles O'Conor. He was a frequent contributor to legal journals and history magazines. Among his published works, Barnes was the author of 1864's The Settlement and Early History of Albany. In addition, he prepared a history on the first fifty years of the political organization he helped found, 1904's Semi-centennial of the Republican Party.

== Civic and professional memberships ==
Barnes was the founder and first president of New York's state Society of Medical Jurisprudence. He was also a fellow of London's Royal Statistical Society. He was a member of the New York State and Albany County bar associations and a member of the American Society of International Law. Barnes belonged to the American Geographical Society and National Geographic Society. He was also a founder of Albany's Fort Orange Club and a member of the Albany Institute of History & Art.

== Death and burial ==
Barnes died at his home in Nantucket on February 22, 1913. He was buried at Albany Rural Cemetery in Menands, New York.

== Family ==
In 1849, Barnes married Emily Weed, a daughter of Whig and Republican leader Thurlow Weed. She died in 1889, and in 1891 Barnes married Elizabeth "Lizzie" Balmer Williams (1844–1926), the widow of San Francisco Evening Bulletin editor Samuel Williams, who had previously worked for the Albany Evening Journal.

With his first wife, Barnes was the father of five children:

- Catherine Weed (1851–1913), the wife and professional partner of photographer Henry Snowden Ward
- Thurlow Weed Barnes (1853–1918), author of a biography of Thurlow Weed and international businessman with railroad and mining interests in China.
- Emily Weed Barnes (1856–1932), the wife of George C. Hollister, a prominent businessman and civic leader of Rochester, New York
- Harriet Isabella Barnes (1864–1928), a notable painter and the wife of Judge Rufus Thayer
- William Barnes Jr. (1866–1930), New York newspaper publisher and Republican Party leader

== Sources ==
=== Books ===
- Harlow, S. R.; Boone, H. H. (1867). Life Sketches of the State Officers, Senators, and Members of the Assembly of the State of New York. Albany, NY: Weed, Parsons and Company. pp. 62-66 – via Internet Archive.
- Kleeberg, Gordon S. P. (1911). The Formation of the Republican Party as a National Political Organization. New York, NY: Columbia University. p. 19 – via Internet Archive.
- New York State Bar Association (1913). Proceedings of the Thirty-Sixth Annual Meeting. Albany, NY: The Argus Company. pp. 713–716 – via Google Books.
- Sabin, Joseph (1868). A Dictionary of Books Relating to America. Vol. 1. New York, NY: J. Sabin, NY. p. 468 – via Google Books.
- Trueblood, Benjamin F., ed. (1904). Official Report of the Thirteenth Universal Peace Congress. Boston, MA: Peace Congress Committee. pp. 6–18 – via Internet Archive.

=== Internet ===
- "Albany Rural Cemetery Burial Cards, 1791–2011, Entry for William Barnes Sr". Ancestry.com. Lehi, UT: Ancestry.com, LLC.

=== Newspapers ===
- "Obituary, Lizzie Balmer Barnes". Oakland Tribune. Oakland, CA. March 1, 1926. p. 27 – via Newspaper Archive.com.

=== Magazines ===
- Koren, John, ed. (March 1912). "Statistics at International Congresses on Hygiene and Demography". Quarterly Publications of the American Statistical Association. Vol. 13. Boston, MA: American Statistical Association. p. 182 – via Google Books.
