= Digital Camera Resource Page =

Digital Camera Resource Page (DCRP) is a digital camera web site, founded in November 1997 by Jeff Keller, and was the first website of its kind. The DCRP is designed as an unofficial resource for current and future owners of digital cameras. It is aimed more toward consumers, rather than serious enthusiasts, with a simpler, easier-to-read review format than what's found on enthusiast websites.

The DCRP has been featured in many publications, most notably The Wall Street Journal, The New York Times, The Washington Post, the San Francisco Chronicle, Money, the Chicago Sun-Times, and The San Diego Union-Tribune, plus several books.

The Digital Camera Resource Page was closed at the end of 2012. Jeff Keller took a position at Digital Photography Review in February 2013, where he worked as a Senior Writer until October 2021.
