= Barnes vs. Roosevelt libel trial =

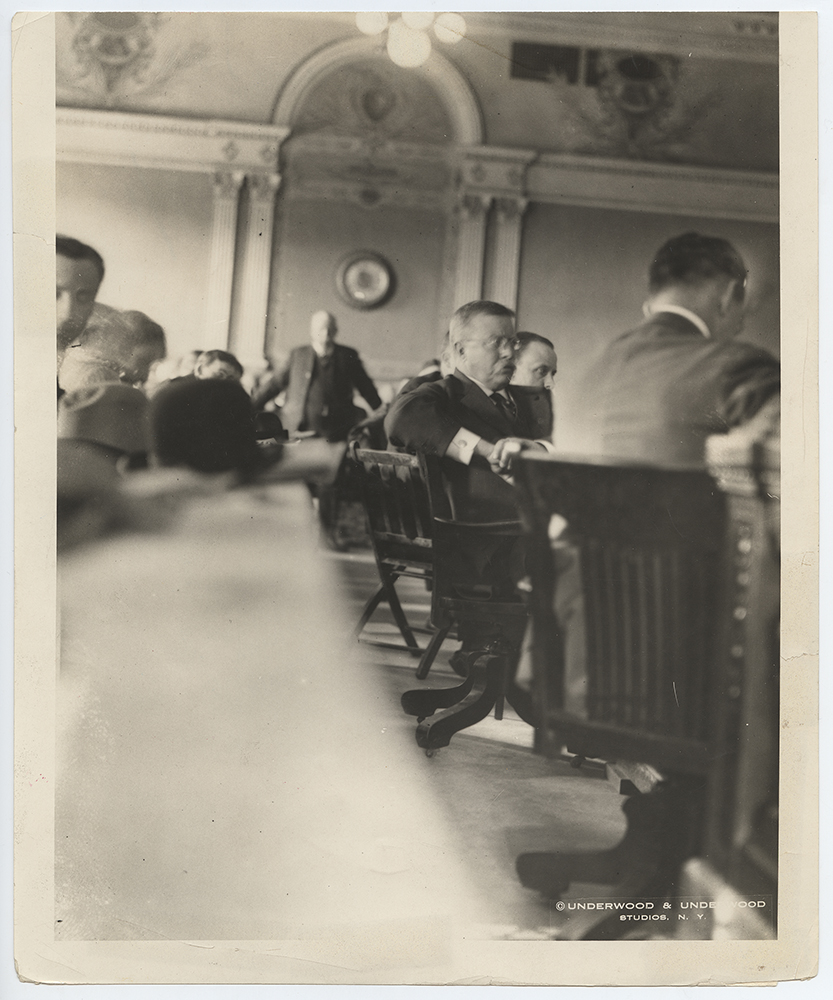
Roosevelt in the courtroom

The William Barnes vs. Theodore Roosevelt libel trial was a 1915 case between former president Theodore Roosevelt and New York State Republican Party Chairman William Barnes Jr. Barnes sued Roosevelt for libel following Roosevelt's accusations of Barnes's corruption. The trial became a high-profile event, and was reported about in newspapers across the country. It ended with Roosevelt's acquittal and played a prominent part in ending Barnes's career as a Republican political leader.

== Background ==
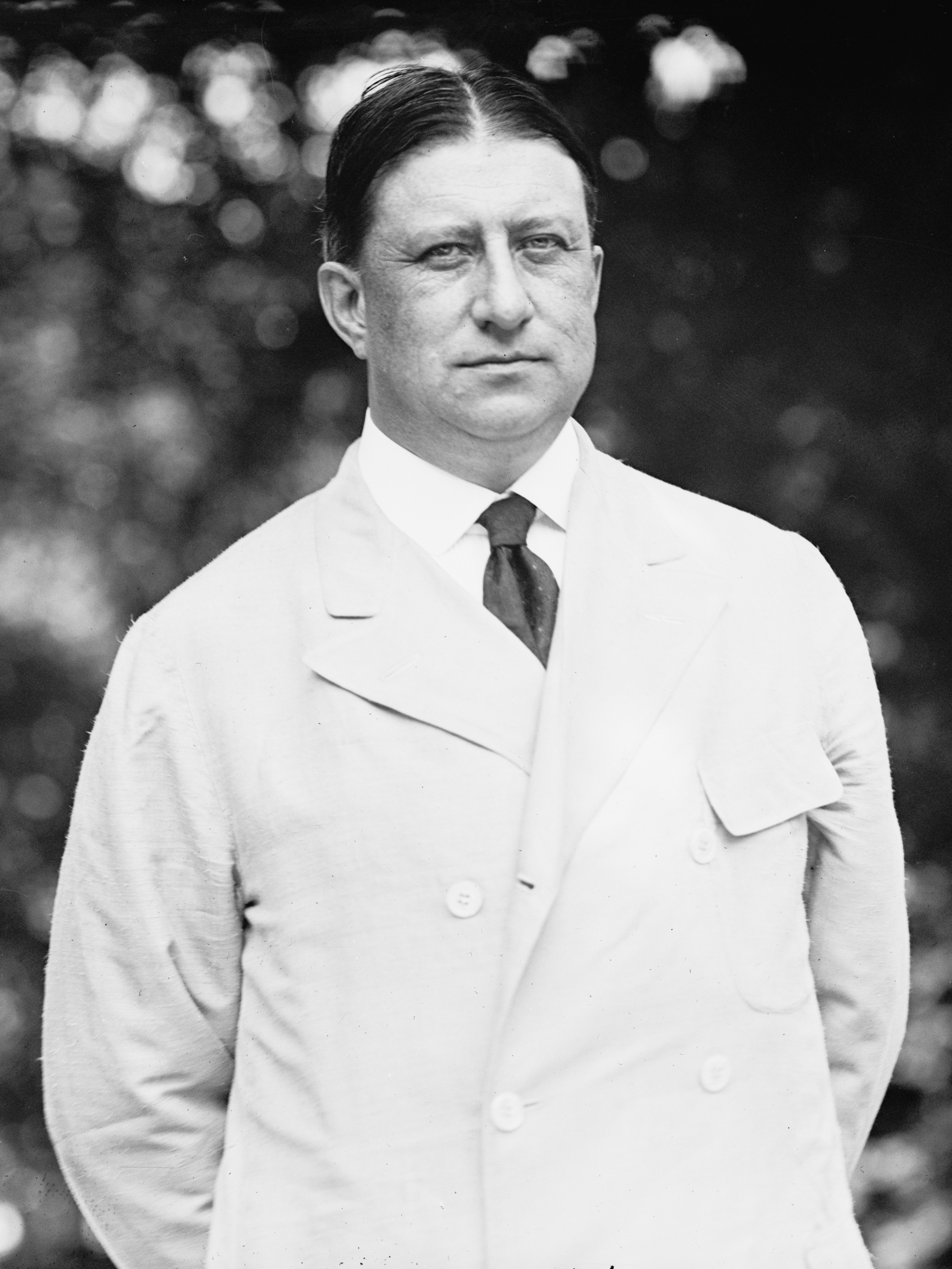
Barnes as a member of the Republican National Committee at around the time of the trial

Going back to the 1880s, Theodore Roosevelt and William Barnes Jr. had been active in New York's Republican Party politics. Barnes, the grandson of Whig and Republican party leader Thurlow Weed, was a successful newspaper publisher and the "boss" of both the city of Albany and Albany County as the head of a political machine that elected Republicans to office and ran both governments. Barnes was also an influential figure at the state and national levels as head of the New York State Republican Party from 1911 to 1914 and New York's member of the Republican National Committee from 1912 to 1916. Barnes was conservative while Roosevelt was progressive; they sometimes worked well together, but were frequently at odds because of their different political ideologies. When Roosevelt ran against incumbent Republican William Howard Taft for the presidency in 1912, Barnes played a key role in obtaining the nomination for Taft. Roosevelt then ran as the candidate of the new Progressive Party, and the split among Republicans enabled the election of Woodrow Wilson.

In the 1914 election for governor of New York, Roosevelt supported progressive Republican Harvey D. Hinman, a former member of the New York State Senate, while Barnes backed Charles Seymour Whitman. In July, Roosevelt made a statement that was widely published, in which he accused Barnes of being a corrupt, obnoxious political boss who was in league with Charles Francis Murphy, the leader of New York's Tammany Hall Democratic Party organization. According to Roosevelt, Barnes And Murphy worked together in secret to thwart the will of the people, preventing the adoption of progressive reforms. Whitman won the Republican nomination and was elected governor, defeating Democrat Martin H. Glynn and several other candidates.

In response to Roosevelt's accusation of a conspiracy between Barnes and Murphy, Barnes filed a libel suit in which he asked for $50,000 in damages. Barnes received advice not to follow through, with supporters suggesting that the publicity would breathe life into Roosevelt's now dormant political career while drawing unwanted attention to Barnes's political activities. Barnes disregarded this counsel, arguing that his honor had been called into question and he needed to reclaim his good name. Barnes may also have been motivated by a desire to end Roosevelt's career permanently; Barnes was known to have designs on the United States Senate seat that was up for election in 1916, and a politically viable Roosevelt might block a potential Barnes candidacy.

== Trial ==
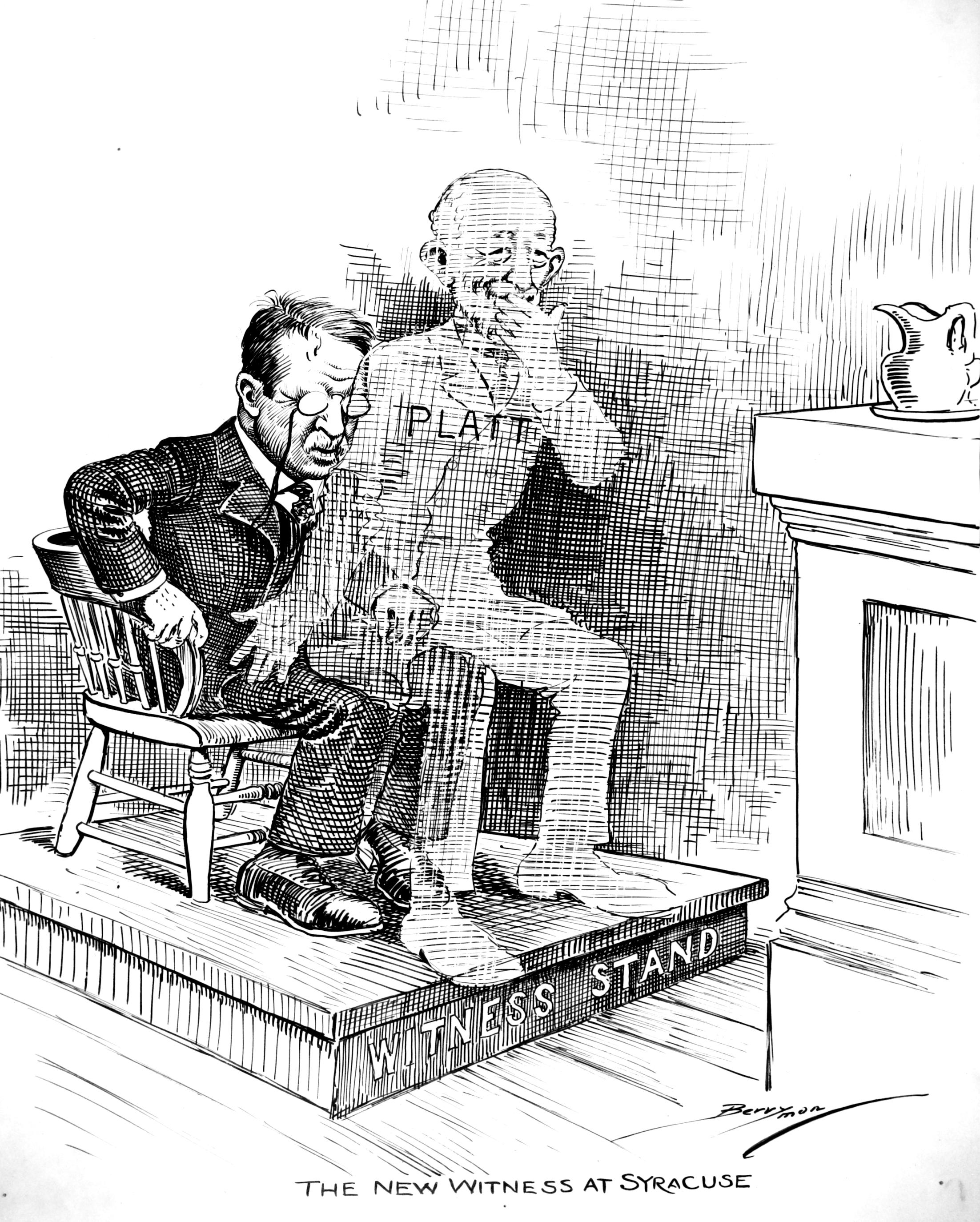
Cartoon by Clifford Berryman depicting Roosevelt on the stand and ghost of Thomas C. Platt smiling

Pretrial activities included a change of venue from Albany to Syracuse, owing to Barnes's supposed control over Albany's government. Roosevelt's chief counsel during the trial was John M. Bowers, while Barnes was represented by William Mills Ivins Sr. The trial began on April 19, 1915, and took five weeks.

With respect to libel, a defendant must prove his innocence; that is, Roosevelt was required to demonstrate that he had not intentionally imparted a malicious public falsehood about Barnes. Roosevelt testified for eight days. Rather than arguing that he had made a slip of the tongue or misspoken, or had been misquoted or taken out of context, or that what he had said was merely campaign rhetoric not meant to be taken literally, Roosevelt argued that what he had said was true. Roosevelt and his legal team provided details about several incidents which Roosevelt claimed proved that Barnes was an unsavory political boss, and that he did work cooperatively with Murphy. Two weeks into the trial, Roosevelt contacted Franklin D. Roosevelt for assistance; Franklin, then serving as Assistant Secretary of the Navy, was a former member of the State Senate. Franklin Roosevelt had disputes with Murphy during his senate tenure, and testified on Theodore Roosevelt's behalf.

The jury took several ballots over two days, and returned a verdict of acquittal. After the trial, it was revealed that until the last ballot, the jury consistently voted 11 to 1 for acquittal, with a lone juror arguing that trial costs ought to be divided between Barnes and Roosevelt. The judge ordered Barnes to pay $1,442.52; attorneys for both sides agreed that Roosevelt could have required Barnes to pay $2,000 more because of the length of the trial, but Roosevelt requested only the actual costs.

== Effects ==
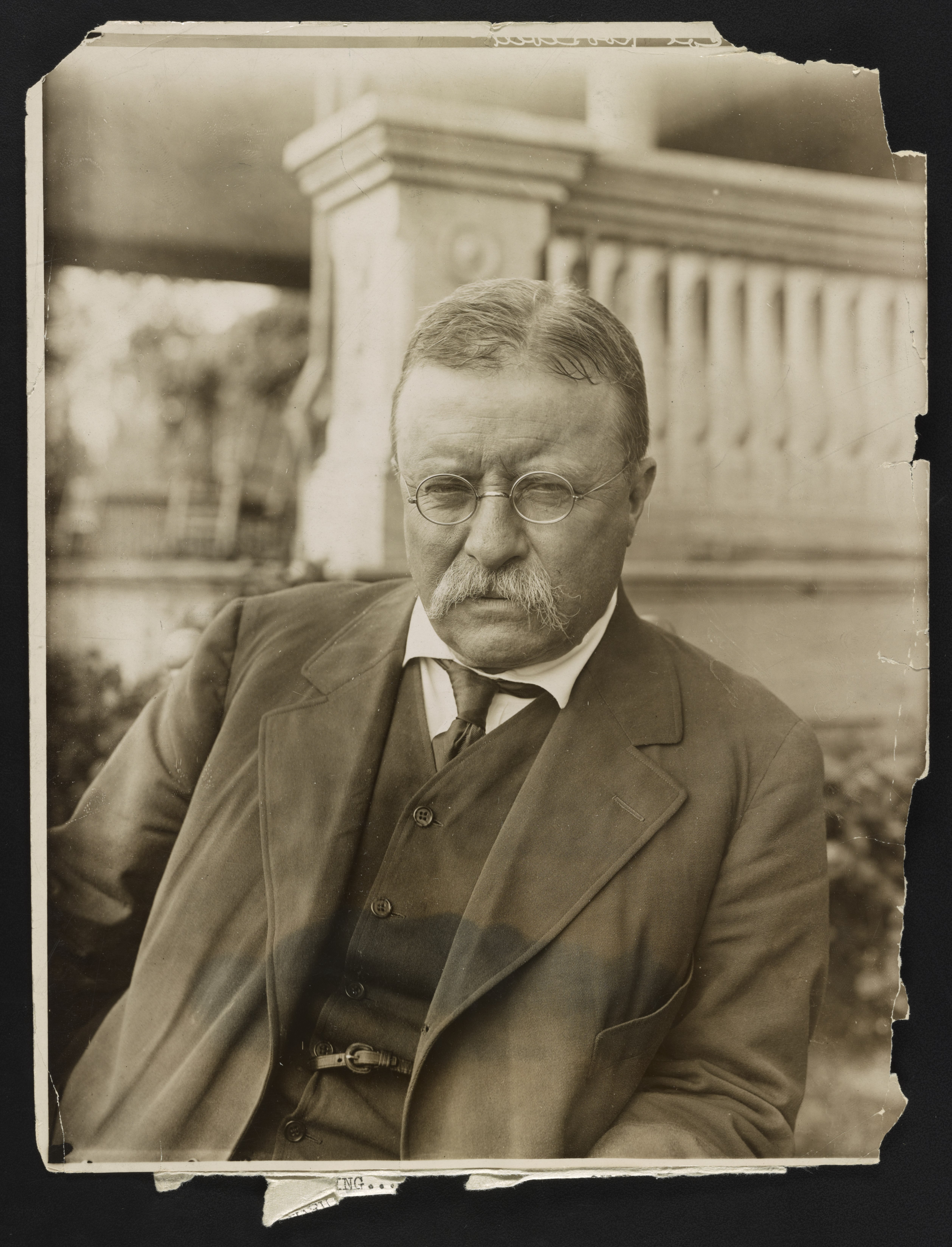
Roosevelt as he appeared in 1916, shortly after the end of the trial

The trial essentially ended Barnes's influence; he was not even considered for the 1916 Republican U.S. Senate nomination and soon left his state and national party posts. He permanently lost his grip on Albany city and county with the 1921 elections, when William Stormont Hackett won the mayor's office and ushered in an era of control by a new machine, this one controlled by Democrat Daniel P. O'Connell.

Roosevelt reclaimed a measure of his status as a national political figure; in 1916, he declined a Progressive presidential nomination and campaigned for Republican nominee Charles Evans Hughes; Hughes narrowly lost to incumbent Woodrow Wilson, but most of Roosevelt's supporters followed him back to the Republican Party. He also advocated for the Preparedness Movement, and when World War I broke out he supported U.S. intervention and made an unsuccessful attempt to raise a volunteer Army unit to command in combat. At the time of his death in 1919, Roosevelt's status had been restored to the point that he was the leading contender for the Republican nomination in the 1920 presidential election.

== Sources ==
- Eisenstadt, Peter R. (Syracuse University Press) (2005). The Encyclopedia of New York State. Binghamton, New York: Maple-Vail Book Manufacturing. ISBN 978-0-8156-0808-0.
- Abrams, Dan; Fisher, David (2019). Theodore Roosevelt for the Defense: The Courtroom Battle to Save His Legacy. Toronto, Canada: Hanover Square Press. ISBN 978-1-3350-1644-7 – via Google Books.
