= Digital Photography Review =

Website about digital cameras and digital photography

- Website type: Online digital camera reviews
- Available in: English
- Headquarters: Seattle, Washington, USA
- Owner: Gear Patrol
- Founder: Phil Askey
- Website: www.dpreview.com
- Launched: November 1998; 28 years ago
- Current status: Online

Digital Photography Review, also known as DPReview, is a website about digital cameras and digital photography, established in November 1998. The website provides comprehensive photography and camera news, reviews of digital cameras, lenses and accessories, buying guides, user reviews, and forums for individual cameras, as well as general photography forums. The website also has a database with information about individual digital cameras, lenses, printers and imaging applications. Originally based in London, Digital Photography Review and most of its team relocated to Seattle, Washington, in 2010. It was owned by Amazon from 2007 to 2023.

== Main features ==
DPReview has regularly published thorough, technically orientated camera reviews since the website launched in 1998. The content and scope of the reviews have changed over time, but the basic formula (extensive descriptions of controls and menus, consistent, repeatable studio tests, side-by-side pixel-level comparisons) has remained unchanged since the earliest days. In 2004, a shorter "concise" review format was introduced for compact cameras, and group tests were added in 2008. The website's camera reviews have always offered side-by-side comparison images and test results from competing cameras. In 2010, an interactive comparison widget was introduced that allowed visitors to compare studio results from any camera in the site's database. Later widgets added the ability to compare other test results (such as noise and dynamic range) between cameras. Extensive real-world sample galleries are available for all reviewed (and some unreviewed) cameras and lenses.

Until February 2010, DPReview did not score cameras numerically, but used a six-level rating system (from best to worst: Highly Recommended, Recommended, Above Average, Average, Below Average, Poor). The site now scores all cameras and lenses using up to 11 categories (which in turn are based on "nearly 60 aspects of camera performance and specification"). Two new discretionary awards ('Gold' and 'Silver') were introduced at the same time as the scoring system.

DPReview introduced lens reviews in 2008.

Although the vast majority of its published reviews are of digital cameras, DPReview also publishes occasional reviews of printers, software, photography books, accessories and mobile imaging devices.

DPReview has a database of digital cameras, lenses, printers and desktop imaging software packages. Camera product pages contain full specifications, product and sample images, user reviews and links to other internal and external resources. The product database offers browse, search and compare features.

DPReview has discussion forums and also commenting (on some, but not all content types), user-created articles and product reviews, photographic challenges and free personal galleries. A simple personal messaging system is available to registered users.

DPReview publishes non-review articles, covering imaging science and technology, photographic techniques, interviews with photographers and industry figures, and buying guides. In 2012, DPReview added a Link Directory that allows registered users to view and subscribe to RSS and Twitter updates from external resources without leaving the site.

DPReview publishes photography news, covering new releases in digital cameras, lenses, smartphones, software, drones, and more.

== Ownership history ==
Digital Photography Review was founded in December 1998 in the United Kingdom by Philip and Joanna Askey. On May 14, 2007, it was acquired by Amazon. DPReview employs a dedicated editorial team of in-house and freelance writers, and was editorially independent of Amazon.

The original founder, Phil Askey, is no longer involved in the day-to-day running of the site. The company directly employs 14 full-time workers. Askey was followed as general manager by Simon Joinson, who took on the role in 2010. Joinson joined the company in 2004, having previously founded and edited several UK digital photography magazines, including What Digital Camera.

The current manager is Scott Everett who joined DPReview in 2011 as a Product Manager.

In 2007, the site had "in excess of 7 million unique viewers monthly."

On March 21, 2023, DPReview announced that it would cease operations, but that its website would remain available as an archive. On June 20, 2023, DPReview was acquired by Gear Patrol and resumed operations.
