= William Chauncey Bartlett =

William Chauncey Bartlett (1818–1907) was an American writer, born December 30, 1818, in Haddam, Connecticut. He attended Williams College, and Ohio University in 1847. He was admitted to Ohio bar, and was a law partner of Hiram Strong in Dayton, Ohio from 1848 to 1855. In 1855 he joined the staff of the Dayton Gazette. In 1857 he preached against slavery in Indianapolis, Indiana.

He went San Francisco in 1860, and preached in California gold mining towns; he was pastor of the First Congregational Church in Santa Cruz from 1860 to 1864. (Note: Mark Twain Project (1990), Mark Twain's Letters, v.2, p.362n7) He was editor of the San Francisco Bulletin in 1866. When the Overland Monthly began in 1868 he was an assistant editor under Bret Harte, and was editor for about a year after Harte left in 1871. (Note: Mott, Frank Luther (1958–1968). “The Overland Monthly”. A history of American magazines, 1741–1930. 3: 402–9.) Later he was a school superintendent, and a board member of Mills College. (Note: http://www.oac.cdlib.org/findaid/ark:/13030/kt1m3nc3x7/)

He was the author of numerous works, including A breeze from the woods (1880). He died December 7, 1907, in Oakland, California.
