= William Barnes Jr. =

American journalist and politician (1866–1930)

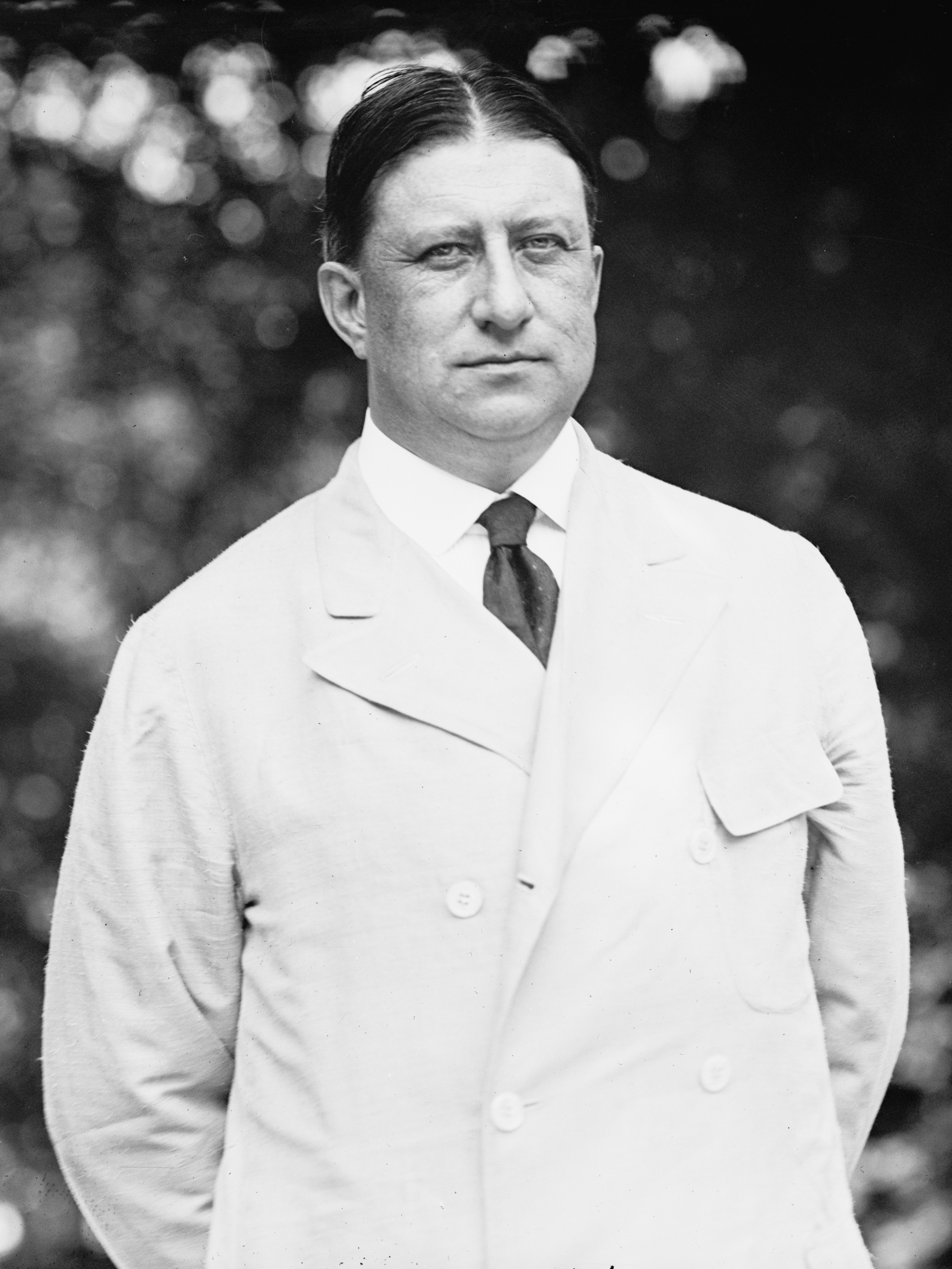
- Harris & Ewing photo of Barnes as a member of the Republican National Committee in 1912

Chairman of the New York Republican State Committee
- In office January 21, 1911 – September 30, 1914
- Preceded by: Ezra P. Prentice
- Succeeded by: Frederick C. Tanner

Member of the Republican National Committee from New York
- In office June 24, 1912 – June 9, 1916
- Preceded by: William L. Ward
- Succeeded by: Herbert Parsons

U.S. Surveyor of Customs for the Port of Albany
- In office January 31, 1899 – February 28, 1911
- Preceded by: John P. Masterson
- Succeeded by: Luther C. Warner

Personal details
- Born: November 17, 1866 Albany, New York, US
- Died: June 25, 1930 (aged 63) Armonk, New York, US
- Resting place: Albany Rural Cemetery, Menands, New York
- Party: Republican
- Spouse(s): Grace Davis, m. 1888–1922 (divorced); Maude (Fiero) Battershall, m. 1923–1929 (her death)
- Relations: Thurlow Weed (grandfather); Catherine Weed Barnes (sister)
- Children: 2
- Parent(s): William Barnes Sr. Emily Peck Weed
- Education: Harvard College
- Profession: Newspaper publisher

William Barnes Jr. (November 17, 1866 – June 25, 1930) was an American journalist and politician. The longtime owner and publisher of the Albany Evening Journal, Barnes was most notable as a major behind the scenes player in state and U.S. politics as a leader of New York's Republican Party.

Barnes was born in Albany, New York, and graduated from The Albany Academy in 1884 and Harvard University in 1888. He worked briefly as a newspaper reporter for the Albany Evening Journal before purchasing the Albany Morning Express, of which he was publisher and editor. In 1889 he purchased the Evening Journal, of which he was also editor and publisher. Barnes became active in New York politics as a leader of the Republican Party. In 1891, he became head of the party in both the city and in Albany County. In 1899, Republican nominee James H. Blessing won the election for mayor. This victory brought about Republican dominance in Albany, and Barnes went on to serve as a member of the New York Republican State Committee from 1892 to 1914, and the committee's chairman from 1911 to 1914. He was a delegate to the Republican National Conventions of 1904, 1908, and 1912, and a member of the Republican National Committee from 1912 to 1916. As an ally of Thomas C. Platt, Barnes became a major figure in national Republican politics; his support for successive Republican presidents William McKinley, Theodore Roosevelt, and William Howard Taft led to his appointment as the U.S. Surveyor of Customs for the Port of Albany, a lucrative position he held from 1899 to 1911. In 1915, he was a delegate to the New York state constitutional convention.

In 1912, Barnes was a key player in obtaining the Republican presidential nomination for the incumbent Taft; in response, Roosevelt ran as the candidate of the Progressive Party, and the split among Republicans helped elect the Democratic nominee, Woodrow Wilson. In a July 1914 editorial, Roosevelt accused Barnes of being a corrupt party boss who conspired with the Democratic Tammany Hall leader Charles Francis Murphy to block progressive reforms in New York. Barnes sued Roosevelt for libel, and the 1915 trial ended with a verdict in favor of Roosevelt. For several years afterwards, Barnes lived in New York City while maintaining his voting residence in Albany.

In 1921, Democrat William Stormont Hackett won the mayor's office, ending Barnes' dominance over Albany politics and ushering in more than 50 years of control by the Democratic organization of Daniel P. O'Connell. In 1925, Barnes sold the Evening Journal to Stephen Carlton Clark, after which he retired and lived in Armonk. He died at his home in Armonk on June 25, 1930, and was buried at Albany Rural Cemetery.

== Early life ==
William Barnes was born in Albany, New York on November 17, 1866, the son of William Barnes Sr. (1824–1913) and Emily Peck Weed (1827–1889). His father was an attorney who helped organize the first New York State convention of the new Republican Party in 1854, and served as state Insurance Commissioner from 1860 to 1870, the first person to hold the position after it was created. Emily Weed was the daughter of Thurlow Weed, a prominent newspaper publisher and the longtime head of New York State's Whig Party, who was also a founder of the Republican Party. The younger Barnes was an 1884 graduate of The Albany Academy, and an 1888 graduate of Harvard College.

== Early career ==
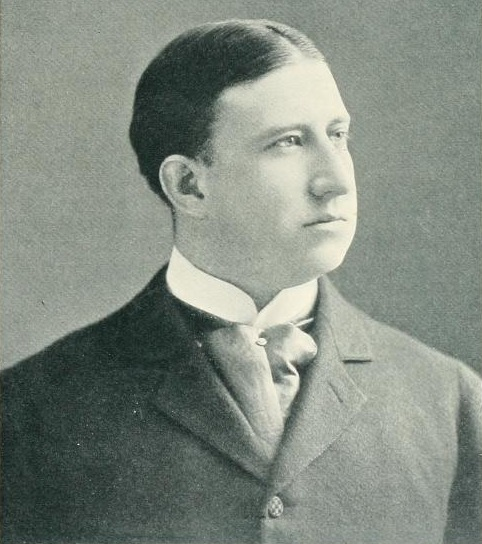
From 1898's The Men of New York, Volume II

Barnes worked briefly as a newspaper reporter for the Albany Evening Journal before purchasing the Albany Morning Express, of which he was publisher and editor. In 1889, he purchased the Evening Journal, of which he was also editor and publisher. During years when Republicans were in control of New York state's government, Barnes' publishing business was frequently selected to print official works, including the reports of government agencies and state government directories.

In addition to his newspaper career, Barnes became active in New York politics as a leader of the Republican Party. In 1891, he became head of the party in both the city and in Albany County. In 1899, the mayoral victory of James H. Blessing brought about over 20 years of Republican dominance in Albany, and Barnes went on to serve as a member of the New York Republican State Committee from 1892 to 1914. (Note: In 1894, Republican Oren Elbridge Wilson won the mayor's office, but his victory was made possible by a coalition of Democrats and anti-Barnes Republicans.)

== Continued career ==
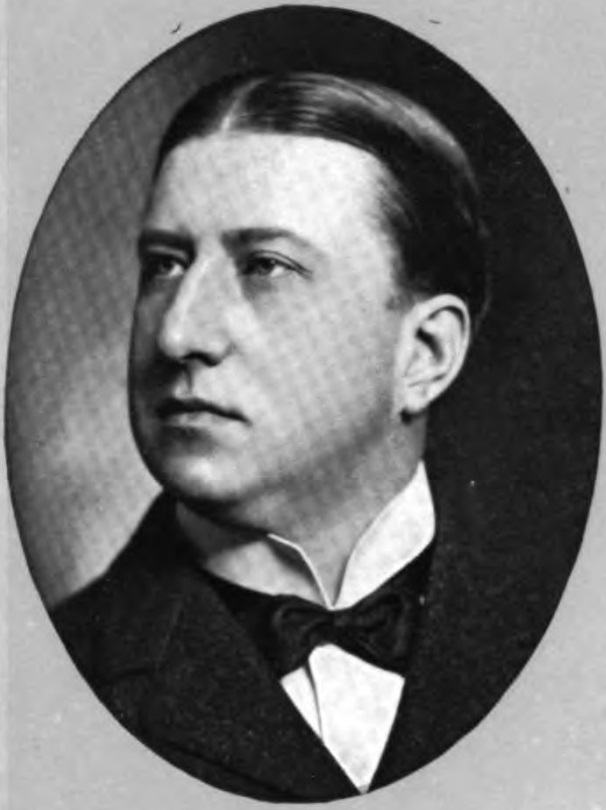
From Volume 1 of 1910's New York State Men

As an ally of Thomas C. Platt, Barnes became a major figure in Republican politics at the national level, and supported successive Republican presidents William McKinley, Theodore Roosevelt, and William Howard Taft. His prominence led to his appointment as the U.S. Surveyor of Customs for the Port of Albany, a lucrative position Barnes held from 1899 to 1911.

Barnes was a delegate to the Republican National Conventions of 1904, 1908, and 1912, and chairman of the state Republican Committee from 1911 to 1914. From 1912 to 1916, Barnes was a member of the Republican National Committee. In 1915, he was a delegate to the New York state constitutional convention.

Incumbent President Taft was a candidate for reelection in 1912. Former President Roosevelt, an advocate for a more active presidency and more liberal policies than Taft, opposed him for the Republican nomination. Barnes was a leader of the party's conservative wing, and was a key player in obtaining the nomination for Taft. In response, Roosevelt's supporters left the party, and Roosevelt ran as the candidate of the newly-organized Progressive Party. The Republican Party split between conservative Taft supporters and Progressive followers of Roosevelt, which enabled the election of the Democratic nominee, Woodrow Wilson.

== Later career ==
In a July 1914 editorial, Roosevelt accused Barnes of being a corrupt party boss who conspired with Charles Francis Murphy, the leader of the Democratic Tammany Hall organization, to block progressive reforms in New York. In response, Barnes sued Roosevelt for libel. Roosevelt argued that he was not liable because the charges he made were true, and the 1915 trial ended with a verdict in Roosevelt's favor.

For several years after the trial, Barnes lived in New York City while maintaining his voting residence in Albany, and he began to be opposed within the city and county Republican Parties. In his later years, his conservatism manifested itself as opposition to the selection of nominees for office by direct primary election, women's suffrage, and organized labor. In 1921, the Democratic organization led by Daniel P. O'Connell nominated William Stormont Hackett for mayor. Hackett won the election, defeating Republican William Van Rensselaer Erving, a Barnes loyalist who had served as the city's public safety commissioner and won the Republican nomination by defeating an anti-Barnes insurgency. Hackett's win ended Barnes' dominance over Albany city and county politics and ushered in more than 50 years of control by O'Connell's organization.

== Retirement and death ==
In 1925, Barnes sold the Evening Journal to Stephen Carlton Clark, after which he retired and lived in Armonk. He died at his home in Armonk on June 25, 1930, and was buried at Albany Rural Cemetery, Section 109, Lot 3.

== Family ==
On June 12, 1888, Barnes married Grace Davis of Cincinnati, Ohio. Their children included sons Thurlow Weed Barnes (1889–1976) and Landon Barnes (1894–1964). William and Grace Barnes divorced in 1922, and in 1923 he married Maude (Fiero) Battershall, who died in 1929.

Barnes' siblings included Thurlow Weed Barnes (1853–1918), an 1876 Harvard graduate who was active in New York's Republican Party and worked for the Albany Evening Journal. He authored a biography of Thurlow Weed, and later became a world traveler and international businessman with railroad and mining interests primarily in China. In addition, Barnes's sister Catherine Weed Barnes was a well-known photographer.

== Sources ==
=== Books ===
- Eisenstadt, Peter R. (Syracuse University Press) (2005). The Encyclopedia of New York State. Binghamton, NY: Maple-Vail Book Manufacturing. ISBN 978-0-8156-0808-0.
- Hills, Frederick Simon. (1910). New York State Men: Biographic Studies and Character Portraits. Vol. 1. Albany, NY: The Argus Company.
- New York State Bar Association (1913). Proceedings of the Thirty-Sixth Annual Meeting. Albany, NY: The Argus Company. pp. 713–716 – via Google Books.
- Perry, Elisabeth Israels; Smith, Karen Manners (2006). The Gilded Age & Progressive Era: A Student Companion. New York, NY: Oxford University Press. ISBN 978-0-19-515670-6.
- Robinson, Frank S. (1977). Machine Politics: A Study of Albany's O'Connells. New Brunswick, NJ: Transaction Books. ISBN 978-0-87855-147-7.
- United States Senate (1899). Congressional Record (1899). Vol. 32. Washington, DC: U.S. Government Printing Office.
- United States Senate (1911). Congressional Record (1911). Vol. 46, Part 3. Washington, DC: U.S. Government Printing Office.
- The Men of New York: A Collection of Biographies and Portraits of Citizens of the Empire State Prominent in Business, Professional, Social, and Political Life During the Last Decade of the Nineteenth Century. Vol. II. Buffalo, NY: G. E. Matthews & Company. 1898.

=== Newspapers ===
- "Seeking the State Printing" (PDF). the New York Times. New York, NY. December 5, 1894.
- "Roosevelt, Beaten, to Bolt Today; Gives the Word in Early Morning; Taft's Nomination Seems Assured". The New York Times. New York, NY. June 20, 1912.
- "William Barnes, Sr., Dead". Brooklyn Daily Eagle. Brooklyn, NY. February 24, 1913 – via Newspapers.com.
- "Barnes, State G.O.P. Leader, Dies". Binghamton Press. Binghamton, NY. Associated Press. June 26, 1930 – via Newspapers.com.
- "Thurlow Barnes, Capitalist, Dead". The Sun. New York, NY. June 28, 1918 – via Newspapers.com.
- "Barnes Genius At Setting up Political Machine". Binghamton Press. Binghamton, NY. June 26, 1930 – via Newspapers.com.
- "Former G.O.P. Chief is Dead". The Berkshire Eagle. Pittsfield, MA. Associated Press. June 26, 1930. p. 24 – via Newspapers.com.

=== Internet ===
- Albany Rural Cemetery (Menands, NY) (June 27, 1930). "Albany Rural Cemetery Burial Cards, 1791-2011, Entry for William Barnes". Ancestry.com. Provo, UT: Ancestry.com, LLC.
