= Frederick C. Tanner =

American politician

Frederick Chauncey Tanner (April 7, 1878 – June 23, 1963) was an American lawyer and politician from New York.

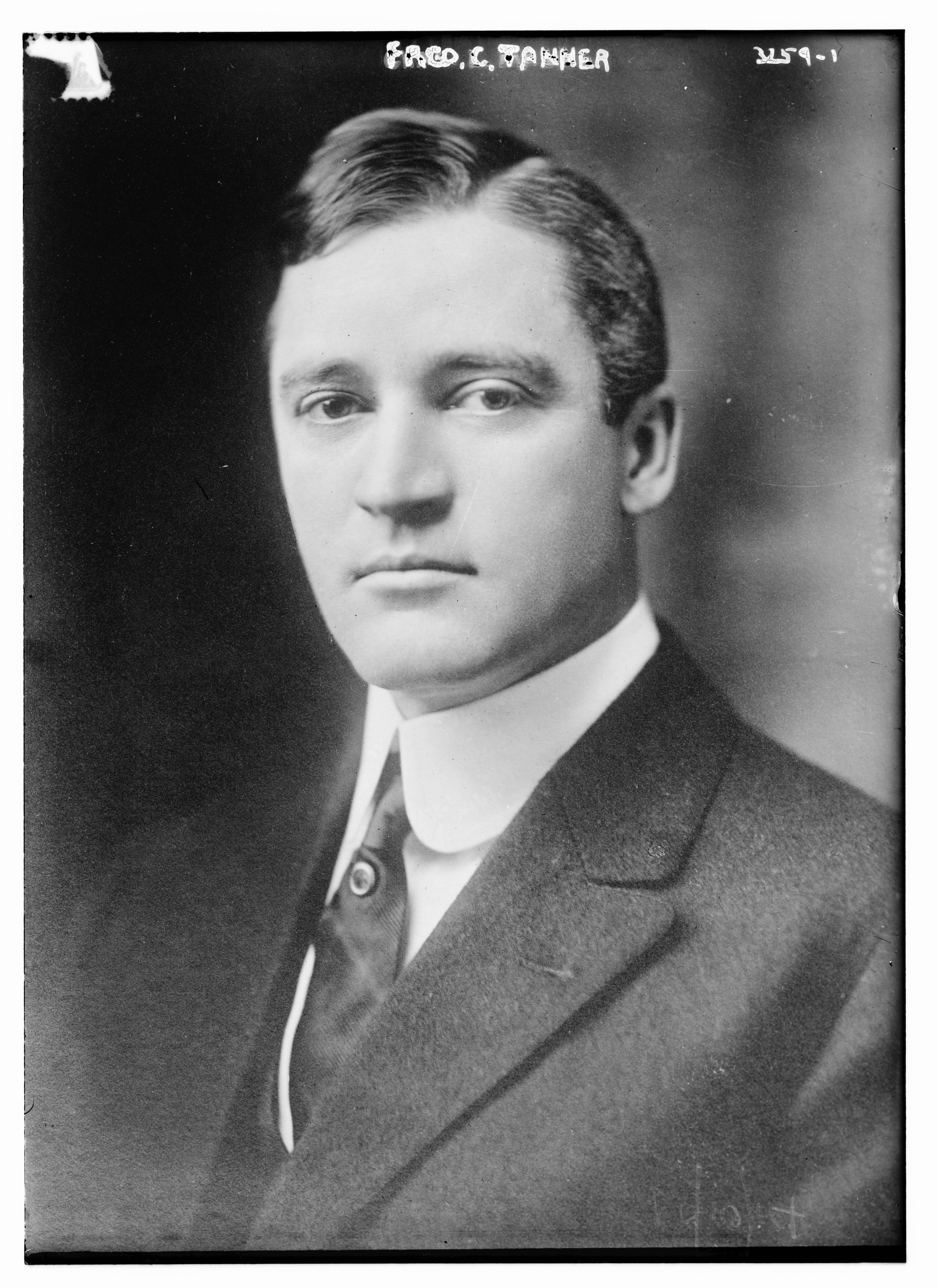
Frederick C. Tanner

== Life ==
Tanner was born on April 7, 1878, in Jacksonville, Illinois, the son of Edward Allen Tanner, president of Illinois College, and Marion Lucy Brown.

Tanner graduated from Illinois College when he was 19, receiving an A.B. and B.S. from there. He taught Latin and mathematics at a high school in Pueblo, Colorado, and spent a year in ranches and mining camps in the Rocky Mountains. In 1899, he moved to New York City and studied at the New York University School of Law. He was the president of his graduating class in 1901 with an LL.B. In 1899, he became associated with the law firm Ritch, Woodford, Bovee & Wallace, which his cousin Stewart L. Woodford was a member of. He rose to become the second member of the firm Woodford, Bovee & Butcher.

In 1910, Tanner was appointed First Deputy Attorney General of New York, in charge of the New York City office. He was a delegate to the 1912 and 1916 Republican National Conventions. He served as chairman of the New York Republican State Committee from 1914 to 1917. He was a delegate to the 1915 New York State Constitutional Convention, serving as chairman of the Committee on Governors and other State Officers. He was in the New York National Guard, serving as private, corporal, and sergeant in the 23rd Regiment, 2nd Lieutenant in the 12th Regiment, and 1st Lieutenant and Captain in the 14th Regiment. In the 1918 United States House of Representatives election, he was the Republican candidate for New York's 17th congressional district. He lost the election to Herbert Pell.

In 1932, Tanner became the senior member of the law firm Tanner, Sillcocks & Friend. The firm worked as attorneys for the Metropolitan Life Insurance Co., Home Life Insurance Co., John Hancock Mutual Life Insurance Co., the Union Dime Savings Bank, the City Savings Bank of Brooklyn, the Peoples' Saving Bank of Providence, Security Mutual Life Insurance Co., and Provident Mutual Life Insurance Co. of Philadelphia. He specialized in real estate and insurance law. He served as president of the Lower Broadway Properties, Inc., and was secretary and treasurer of Bar Building, Inc, both building firms. He also was founder and president of the Piping Rock Wild Game Bird Sanctuary in Locust Valley.

Tanner was a member of the New York State Bar Association, the New York City Bar Association, the New York County Lawyers' Association, the Union Club, the Players Club, the Apawamis Club, Phi Beta Kappa, Phi Delta Phi, the Mayflower Society, the Society of the Cincinnati, the Piping Rock Club, the National Golf Links of America, the Manhattan Club, and the New York Young Republican Club, the Sons of the American Revolution, and the General Society of Colonial Wars. He was a Congregationalist. In 1915, he married Mary Ogden of Albany. Their children were Frederick Chauncey, Jane Ogden, and Edward Ogden.

Tanner died at home in Locust Valley on June 23, 1963.

Party political offices
Preceded by William Barnes Jr.	Chairman of the New York Republican State Committee; 1914–1917	Succeeded by George A. Glynn
