= Anti-Masonic Enquirer =

Newspaper in Rochester, New York

- Type: Weekly
- Founder(s): Thurlow Weed and Samuel Heron
- Founded: 1828; 198 years ago
- Ceased publication: 1834
- Political alignment: Anti-Masonic Party
- Language: English
- City: Rochester, New York
- Country: United States
- OCLC number: 10508113

The Anti-Masonic Enquirer (also known as the Antimasonic Enquirer and the Rochester Antimasonic Inquirer) was an American weekly newspaper associated with the Anti-Masonic Party.

The Anti-Masonic Enquirer was established in Rochester, New York in February 1828 by Thurlow Weed and Samuel Heron, as a successor to Heron's previous publication the Rochester Balance. It was one of a large number of American newspapers during this period founded to support the activities of the Anti-Masonic Party. Andrew Burt described the newspaper as "the most prominent, Anti-Masonic newspaper in the country, pumping Anti-Masonic literature into communities throughout the nation".

Heron withdrew from ownership of the newspaper the following year, and Weed in 1830, with D.N. Sprague continuing as publisher until October 1831 when the newspaper was sold to Erastus Shepard. Shepard renamed the newspaper the Rochester Antimasonic Inquirer in November 1831, and the newspaper subsequently went through several additional name changes.

It was merged in 1834 with the National Republican.

== See also ==
- Solomon Southwick
