= Samuel Williams (American author) =

American newspaper editor and author

Samuel Williams (1826 – June 30, 1881) was an American newspaper editor and author of Welsh descent. He was born in Utica, New York. He worked for the Albany Evening Journal and San Francisco Evening Bulletin. After his death, his widow Elizabeth Balmer became the wife of William Barnes Sr.

== Sources ==
- Smith, Harriet E.; Bucci, Richard; Salamo, Lin, eds. (1990), Mark Twain's Letters, Volume 2: 1867-1868, University of California Press, p. 209, ISBN 9780520906075
- William C. Bartlett, "Samuel Williams, Journalist", Californian 4 (October): 323-30
- "Deaths", S.F. Evening Bulletin, July 1, 1881, p. 3
