= Henry Snowden Ward =

19th/20th-century English photographer and author

Henry Snowden Ward (27 February 1865 – 7 December 1911) was an English photographer and author. Often in collaboration with his wife, the photographer Catharine Weed Barnes, he produced periodicals and textbooks about photography and produced illustrated works of literature.

== Early life ==
Ward was born at Great Horton, Bradford, in 1865, eldest of five sons of William Ward, stuff manufacturer, and his wife Mary, only daughter of Henry Snowden, manufacturer. He was educated at Bradford Grammar School and at Bradford Technical College, and entered in 1880 his father's business.

With Herbert James Riley he established the periodical The Practical Naturalist (afterwards amalgamated with The Naturalist's World), and founded the Practical Naturalists' Society. In 1885 he joined the printing and publishing firm Percy Lund & Co. of Bradford, for whom in 1890 he founded and edited the monthly periodical, the Practical Photographer. He soon became a recognised authority on photography and kindred technical subjects.

== In America ==
Ward left Bradford for London in 1891 and paid his first visit to America in 1892. In America, he married on 15 July 1893 Catharine Weed Barnes, daughter of William Barnes of Albany, New York, and granddaughter of Thurlow Weed, a prominent New York journalist and politician.

After returning to England they lived for many years at Golden Green, Hadlow, Kent.

== Publications ==
=== Periodicals and technical works ===
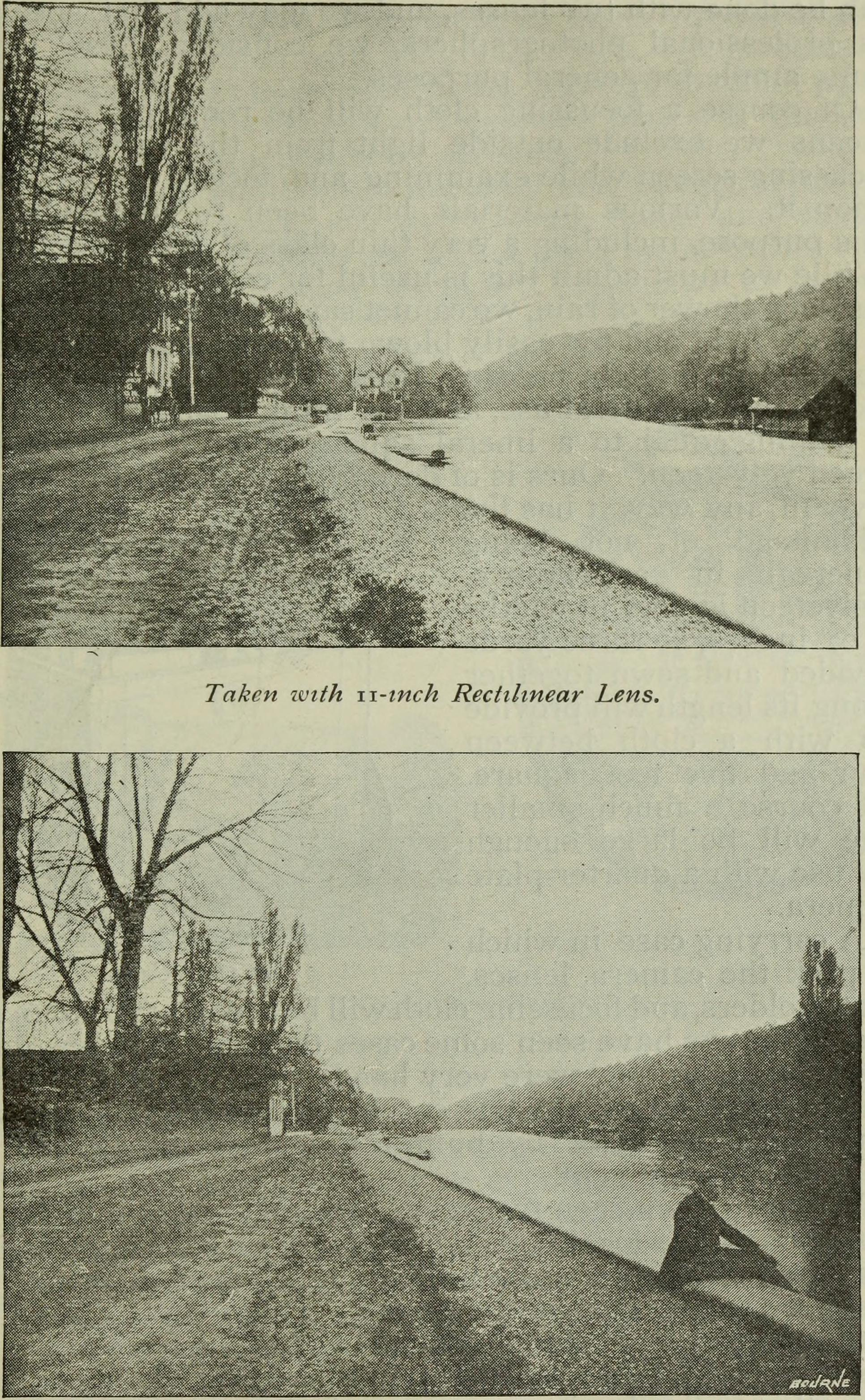
Illustration from Early work in Photography: a text-book for beginners by W. Ethelbert Henry and H. Snowden Ward (1896)

He and his wife, an accomplished photographer, edited in London The Photogram (1894–1905), continued from 1906 as The Photographic Monthly; The Process Photogram (1895–1905), continued from 1906 as The Process Engravers' Monthly; also Photograms of the Year (from 1896) and The Photographic Annual (from 1908).

He also compiled many technical handbooks, of which the chief were Practical Radiography, the first handbook in English on X-rays, then known as Röntgen rays (with A. W. Isenthal, 1896; new editions in 1897, 1898, and 1901); The Figures, Facts, and Formulæ of Photography (3 editions, 1903); Photography for the Press (1905; 3rd edition 1909); and Finishing the Negative (1907). For the photographic firm of Dawbarn & Ward (in existence from 1894 to 1911), of which he was a joint director, he edited the Useful Arts Series (1899), the Home Workers' Series, and Rural Handbooks (1902).

=== Literature ===
Literature and topography also attracted Ward, and he and his wife wrote and copiously illustrated with photographs taken by themselves: Shakespeare's Town and Times (quarto, 1896; 3rd enlarged edit. 1908); The Shakespearean Guide to Stratford-on-Avon (1897); The Real Dickens Land (quarto, 1903); and The Canterbury Pilgrimages (1904). Ward also edited, with notes and introduction, an edition, elaborately illustrated by his wife, of R. D. Blackmore's Lorna Doone in 1908.

== Societies, travels and death ==
He became a member of the Royal Photographic Society in 1892 and a fellow in 1895. He was one of the first members in 1897 of the Röntgen Society, and was president in July 1909 of the Canterbury meeting of the Photographic Convention of the United Kingdom, founded in 1886 to promote photographic research.

Ward was an ardent traveller and made many lecturing tours in Great Britain, Canada, and the United States. His topics were both technical and literary. An enthusiastic admirer of Dickens, he was an original member of the Dickens Fellowship, was chairman of council (1907–8), and was mainly responsible for the acquisition for the Guildhall Library of Frederick George Kitton's collection of Dickensiana in 1908.

As commissioner of the Dickens Fellowship, he went in October 1911 to America on a six months' lecture tour to stimulate American interest in the Dickens centenary; but he died suddenly in New York from mastoiditis-meningitis on 7 December 1911, and was buried at Albany, New York.
