= Catharine Weed Barnes =

American photographer (1851–1913)

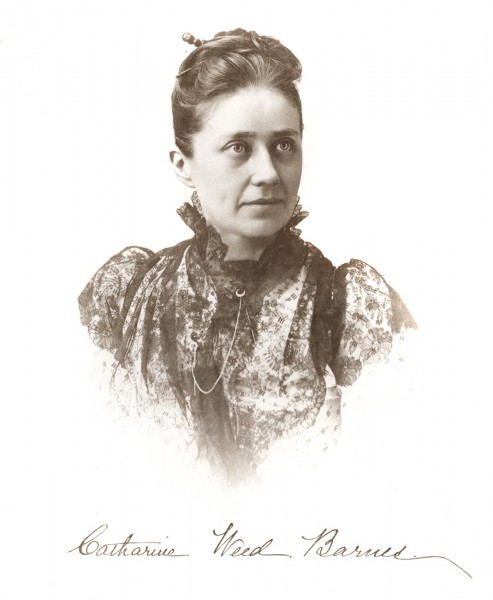
- Photographed by Edward S. Sterry (1890)
- Born: Catharine Weed Barnes; January 10, 1851; Albany, New York, United States
- Died: July 31, 1913 (aged 62); Hadlow, England
- Known for: photographer

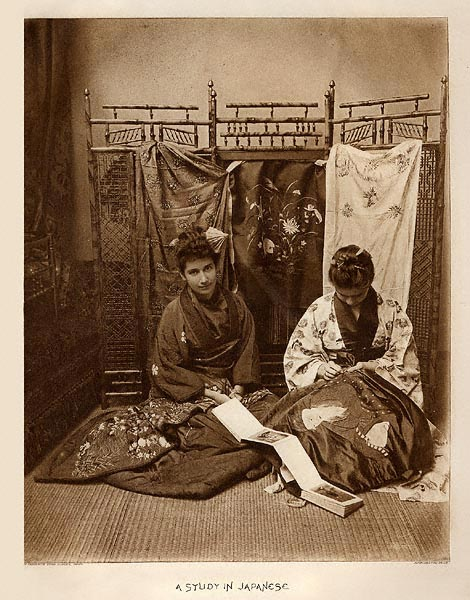
Catharine Weed Barnes, A Study in Japanese, photogravure, 1890

Catharine Weed Barnes (January 10, 1851 – July 31, 1913) was an early American photographer who later lived in England. She was a strong supporter of women photographers.

== Early life and education ==
Catharine Weed Barnes was born in Albany, New York, the oldest child of well-to-do parents William Barnes Sr. and Emily P. (Weed) Barnes (daughter of the politician Thurlow Weed). Her siblings included brother William Barnes Jr., a newspaper publisher and leader of New York's Republican Party. She attended Vassar College but her time was cut short by familial obligations. In 1872, she went to Russia with her father, who was a delegate to an international congress.

She took up photography in 1886 and in 1890 became an editor for American Amateur Photographer magazine, contributing a column entitled "Women's Work". She later also contributed to Frank Leslie's Weekly. She joined several associations that were usually reserved for men, including the National Photographers' Association of America and the Camera Club of New York. Her work, including prints and magic lantern slides, won prizes at amateur photography exhibitions.

In 1892, she travelled to Britain to address the Photographic Convention of the United Kingdom in Edinburgh. In London, she met Henry Snowden Ward, an editor of photography journals, who soon became her husband. She settled in England and with him edited in London The Photogram (1894–1905), continued from 1906 as The Photographic Monthly; The Process Photogram (1895–1905), continued from 1906 as The Process Engravers' Monthly; also Photograms of the Year (from 1896) and The Photographic Annual (from 1908). The couple's punctilious insistence on the term 'photogram' in these titles, at least until 1906 when they bowed to common usage, was a result of their conviction that the etymology of 'photography' demanded that the word 'photograph' was the verb, and that the product of the act of photography was the photogram, just as one 'telegraphs' a 'telegram'.

She also illustrated several books by her husband with photographs she had taken, including Shakespeare's Town and Times (1896), The Canterbury Pilgrimages (1904), and The Real Dickens Land (1904). Throughout her career, Barnes spoke in support to women in photography, insisting that their work should be judged according to the same criteria as those applied to men.

Catharine Weed Barnes died in Hadlow, England.

== Legacy ==
Barnes took some 10,000 photographs on glass plates negatives over the course of her career but only about a fifth are known to have survived. Archives of her work are held by the George Eastman Museum in Rochester, New York, and by the Kent Archaeological Society in Maidstone, England. The latter collection features photographs Barnes made for her husband's books.
