= San Francisco Evening Bulletin =

Newspaper in San Francisco, California

Photograph of the Bulletin office at the corner of Montgomery and Merchant Streets by I. W. Taber, 1880

The San Francisco Evening Bulletin was a newspaper in San Francisco, founded as the Daily Evening Bulletin in 1855 by James King of William. King used the newspaper to crusade against political corruption, and built it into having the highest circulation in the city. He died a year after its founding, assassinated by rival newspaperman and local politician James P. Casey, whom King had exposed as an ex-felon.

== Editors ==
Bulletin staff, 1901

R. A. Crothers, Proprietor

Thomas F. Boyle, Business Manager

Fremont Older, Managing Editor

William Chauncey Bartlett and Samuel Williams were among its editors, with Williams "responsible for dramatic criticism and book reviews". In December 1894, Robert Alexander Crothers purchased the San Francisco Evening Bulletin from the estate of Loring Pickering. Fremont Older became editor-in-chief in 1895, at a time when the newspaper had diminished in influence, and he built it up by again attacking corruption, especially during the San Francisco graft trials. He was forced to step down in 1918.

== Writers ==
On 13 June 1913, "Alice Smith", an anonymous sex worker in San Francisco, began sharing stories of her Red Light life in the San Francisco Evening Bulletin, with "A voice from the Underworld".

== Merger ==
In 1929 the newspaper was bought by William Randolph Hearst, who merged it with The San Francisco Call.

== See also ==
- List of San Francisco newspapers
