= The Photogram =

Photography magazine published in the United Kingdom and USA 1894-1920

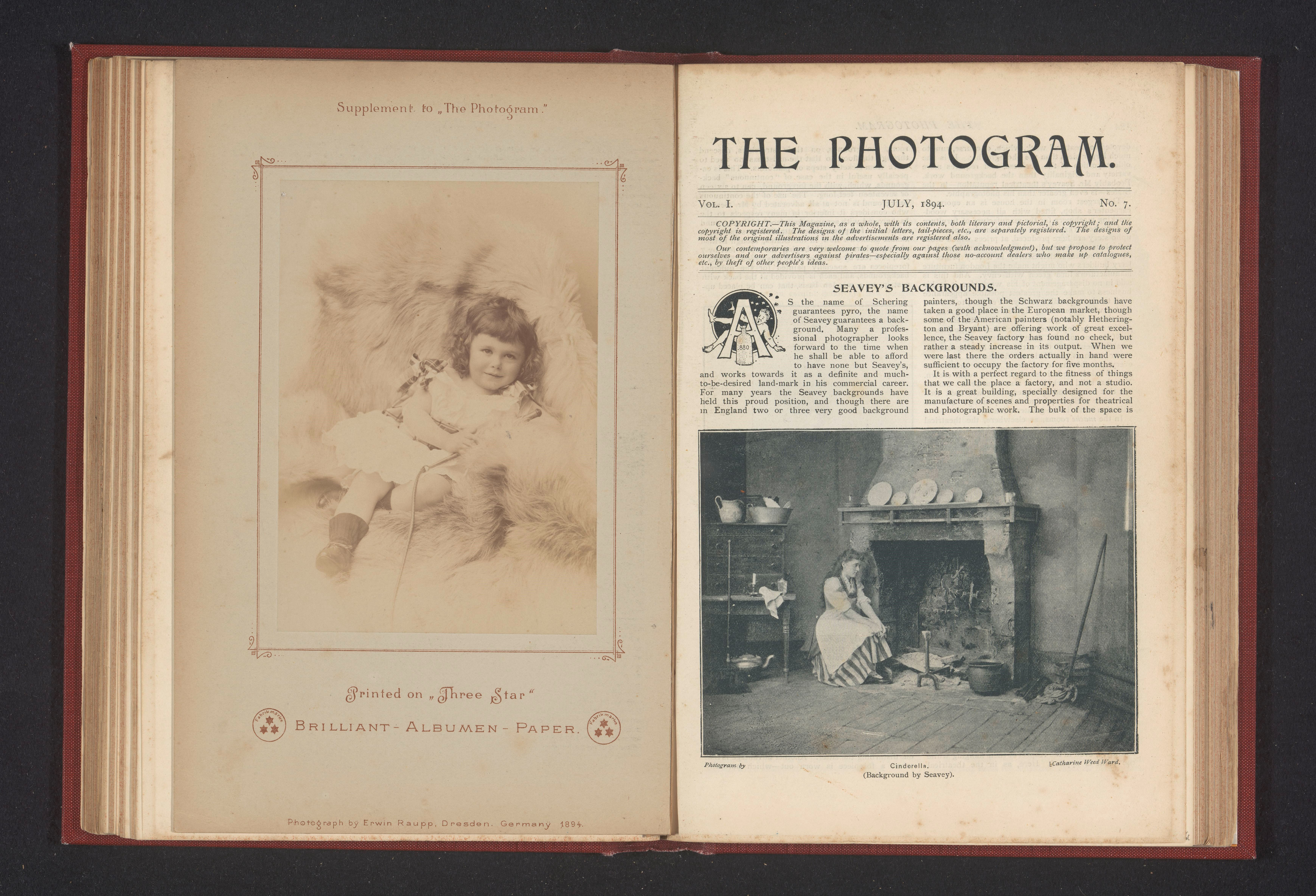
The Photogram

The Photogram (1894–1920) was a photography magazine published in the United Kingdom with an edition printed in America.

== The publication ==
The two founders of The Photogram were Henry Snowden Ward and the significant American feminist photographer Catharine Weed Barnes who married in 1893. She, who was born in Albany, had become a photographer in 1886 and in 1890 became an editor of American Amateur Photographer magazine, contributing a column entitled 'Women's Work'. He was born in Bradford, where by 1884 he was working with Percy Lund & Co., and for them in 1890 launched and edited The Practical Photographer, which he left when together the couple started The Photogram, published in London by Dawbarn and Ward, which continued until 1920.

The couple's punctilious insistence on the term 'photogram' in this title and many of their others was a result of their conviction that the etymology of 'photography' demanded that the word 'photograph' was the verb, and that the product of the act of photography was the photogram, just as one 'telegraphs' a 'telegram'. From 1906 they appear to have bowed to common usage, renaming The Photogram as The Photographic Monthly; 'Photogram' has since come to mean a camera-less form of photography.

== Format and contents ==
The monthly magazine catered to the advanced amateur and professional and promoted Pictorialism, which was emerging in the 1890s, and art photography, with contributions from by Francis Meadow Sutcliffe, member of The Linked Ring, among other significant authors. Each issue was of about 24 pages measuring about 15 × 23 cm (9 × 6 inches) and a regular feature was a supplement of full-page photographs printed in high quality; it was a little smaller than the pages of its contemporary the British Journal of Photography and other early photographic journals. As an example of the magazine's contents, the March 1895 issue contained articles on Henry Peach Robinson (pp. 65–72) and a brief biography of Scottish-born J. Traill Taylor FRPS, founder of the Edinburgh Photographic Society and editor of the British Journal of Photography who was to die of dysentery in Florida later that year in November (pp. 57–58). These articles were accompanied by portraits of the two men and reviews of their books; Picture Making by Photography by HP Robinson and Optics of Photography and Photographic Lenses by J Traill Taylor. The picture supplement was devoted to photo-micrographic work by Scottish microbiologist A.H. Baird.

== Other titles ==
=== Photograms of the Year ===
This was edited and by Ward and Barnes and published from 1895, and published by The Photogram's published by Dawbarn & Ward Ltd. It provided an overview of progress in photography by the editors and from international contributors, and a series of plates illustrative of international art photography. The publication was later edited by F J Mortimer FRPS and was published by Iliffe and Co Ltd, publishers of Amateur Photographer magazine. It ceased publication in 1962 after a late revamp and title change to New Photograms.

=== The American Photogram ===
The Photogram was simultaneously published in America as The American Photogram with an American section “with the latest home news" edited there by F.J. Harrison, with its own numbering.

=== The Process Photogram ===
Due to Ward’s and Barnes' own interest in the growing industry of photomechanical reproduction, and increasingly, that of a cohort of their readers, they added a small supplement on the technology. By 1896 it had increased in size and was released as a separate trade journal The Process Photogram.

=== The Photographic Monthly ===
The Photogram was renamed and continued as The Photographic Monthly after 1906.

=== The Photogram newsletter ===
There is an unrelated recent title, also The Photogram, that is the newsletter of the Michigan Photographic Historical Society, published quarterly since 1972.
