= Thurlow Weed =

United States political manager and journalist

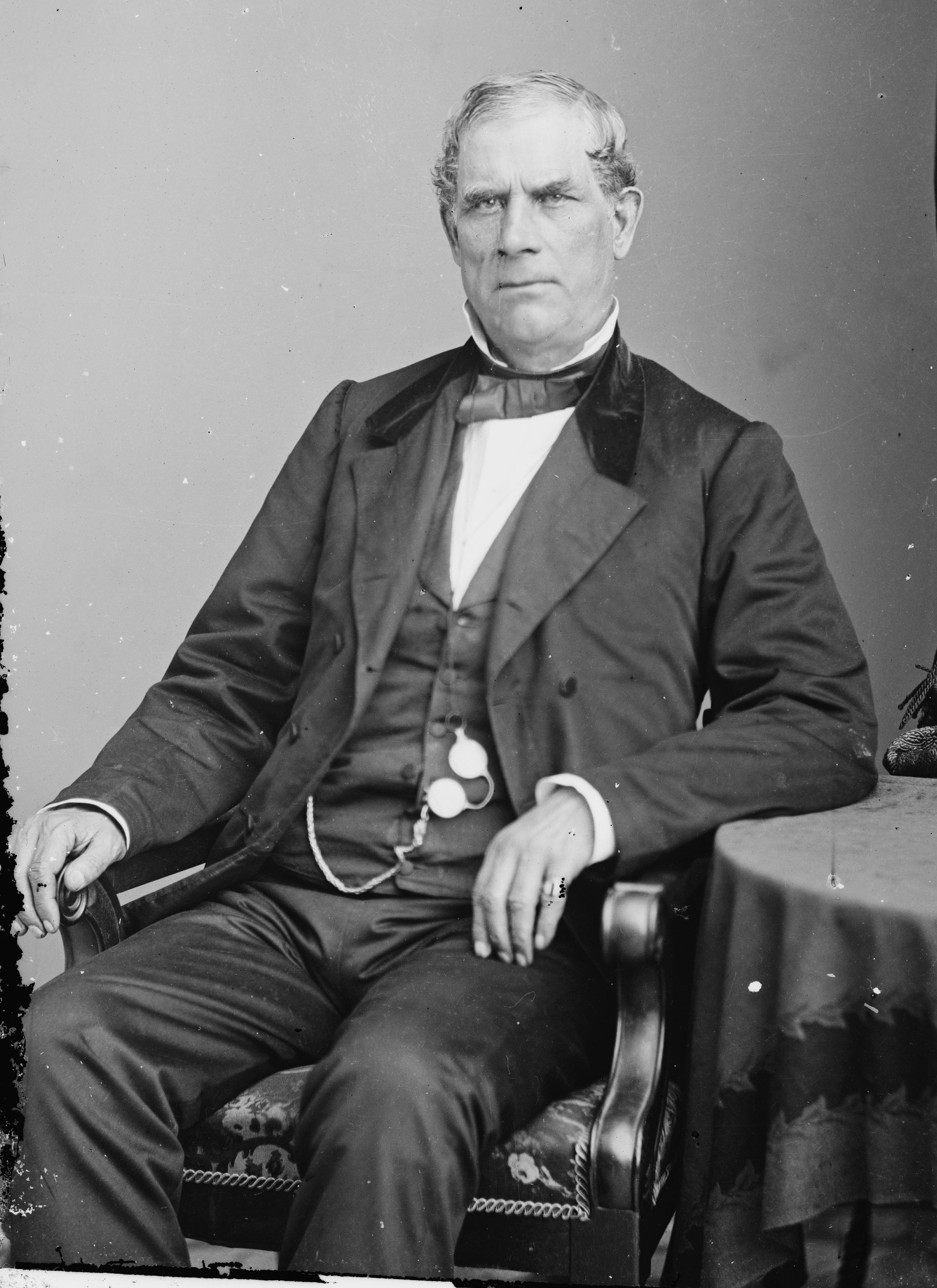
- Weed at the height of his influence, c. 1860. Brady-Handy photograph, Prints and Photographs Division, Library of Congress.

Member of the New York State Assembly from Monroe County
- In office January 1, 1830 – December 31, 1830 Serving with Ezra Sheldon Jr., Joseph Randall
- Preceded by: John Garbutt, Heman Norton, Reuben Willey
- Succeeded by: Samuel G. Andrews, Isaac Lacey, Peter Price
- In office January 1, 1825 – December 31, 1825 Serving with Gustavus Clark, Henry Fellows
- Preceded by: Peter Price, Major H. Smith, Enos Stone
- Succeeded by: Henry Fellows, Isaac Lacey, Vincent Mathews

Personal details
- Born: Edward Thurlow Weed; November 15, 1797 Cairo, Greene County, New York, U.S.
- Died: November 22, 1882 (aged 85) New York City, New York, U.S.
- Resting place: Albany Rural Cemetery
- Party: Democratic-Republican; Adams Republican; Anti-Masonic; Whig; Republican
- Spouse: Catherine Ostrander (m. 1818; died 1858)
- Relations: William Barnes Jr. (grandson); Catharine Weed Barnes (granddaughter)
- Children: 4
- Occupation: Printer, publisher and editor
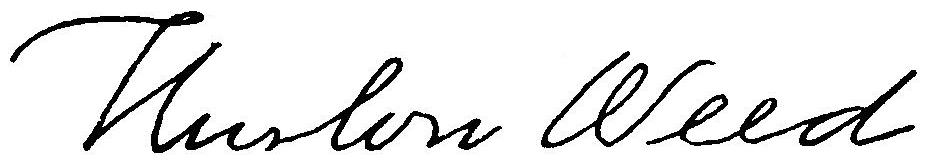
- Signature

Military service
- Allegiance: United States; New York
- Branch/service: New York Militia
- Years of service: 1812–1814
- Rank: Sergeant
- Unit: 40th Regiment
- Battles/wars: War of 1812

Edward Thurlow Weed (November 15, 1797 – November 22, 1882) was an American printer, newspaper publisher, and Whig and Republican politician. He was the principal political advisor to prominent New York politician William H. Seward and was instrumental in the presidential nominations of William Henry Harrison (1840), Zachary Taylor (1848), and John C. Frémont (1856).

Born in Cairo, New York, Weed apprenticed as a printer under William Williams and served with him in the War of 1812 before winning election to the New York State Assembly. He met Seward in the assembly, and they formed a close political alliance that lasted for several decades. Weed and Seward became leaders of the New York Anti-Masonic Party, and Weed established the Albany Evening Journal as the party's main newspaper. Weed supported the American System of Henry Clay and helped establish the Whig Party in the 1830s. He helped Seward win election as Governor of New York and supported the successful presidential candidacies of Harrison and Taylor.

Weed led New York's Whigs for much of the 1830s and 1840s but abandoned the party following the passage of the Kansas–Nebraska Act. He helped organize the Republican Party and supported Frémont's nomination at the 1856 Republican National Convention. He led the effort to nominate Seward at the 1860 Republican National Convention, but the convention nominated Abraham Lincoln. After the Civil War, Weed and Seward allied with President Andrew Johnson and supported Johnson's approach to Reconstruction. Weed retired from public life in 1867 and died in 1882.

== Early life ==
Edward Thurlow Weed was born on November 15, 1797, in the hamlet of Acra, part of the town of Cairo in Greene County, New York. His father, Joel Weed (1773–1819) and mother Mary (Ellis) Weed (1771–1841) were Connecticut natives who moved to New York to farm, and Weed was the eldest of five siblings, three brothers and two sisters. Neither of his sisters reached adulthood. His brother Orrin was apprenticed to a New York City shipbuilder, Henry Eckford, and died in 1823 during a yellow fever epidemic. His brother Osborn moved to Tennessee, where he was a successful merchant and hotelier before he died in 1851. Weed was christened Edward Thurlow Weed, named for a presumed family connection to Edward Thurlow, England's Lord Chancellor. As a boy, Weed dropped his first name; as an adult, he attempted to document the family connection during a visit to England, but was unsuccessful.

Weed's father later moved the family to the village of Catskill where he operated a business hauling freight by wagon from the Hudson River docks. Joel Weed's business suffered reverses because of his ill health, the sickness of his horses, accidents, and occasional non-payment by his customers, so his family struggled financially. Joel Weed was eventually sentenced to debtors' prison, but friends and customers signed bonds on his behalf. These guarantees permitted him to take advantage of the freedom of the prison, which allowed debtors to travel within permitted limits to earn money to satisfy their obligations, and to spend Sundays with their families. Thurlow Weed received about a year of formal education in Catskill before beginning to work so he could help support his family. At age eight, he was hired to operate a blacksmith's bellows for six cents a day. He later worked as an errand boy at a Catskill tavern and hotel, then at a print shop, after which he spent much of his youth working as a cabin boy on boats that traveled the Hudson River.

In 1808, Joel Weed's family moved to Cincinnatus, New York, where he worked as a woodcutter, maple syrup maker, and farm laborer with Thurlow's assistance. While living in Cincinnatus, Weed attended a local school for a brief period before the family moved again, this time to Onondaga. In both Cincinnatus and Onondaga, Weed worked to improve on his formal education by diligent self-study, sometimes walking several miles to visit neighbors who would allow him to borrow books. In Onondaga, Joel Weed earned a living by cutting wood for a potash maker, again with his son's aid. Thurlow Weed later worked at an Onondaga iron forge, where his task was to temper the sand used in casting and molding. During a period when the forge was not in operation, Weed obtained a position as a groomsman and gardener for the Onondaga County Clerk, which included his room and board, as well as the promise of additional schooling. For several months, Weed was able to attend a private academy run by the Reverend Caleb Alexander. When the forge resumed operations, Weed returned to his position there.

== Start of career ==
=== Printer ===
Weed learned in 1810 that Thomas Chittenden Fay intended to start a newspaper in Onondaga, the Lynx. Having decided on a career in printing and publishing, Weed and his father convinced Fay to take Weed on as a second apprentice. His first tasks included cutting wood and stoking fires, as well as preparing the sheepskins used in making ink balls. Weed soon began to take on additional responsibilities, including building and maintaining files of newspapers with which the Lynx exchanged stories, which enabled Fay to develop a network of affiliated newspapers. In 1812, Fay left the newspaper after a dispute with his creditors; Weed printed a handful of issues to publish advertisements that had already been paid for, after which the Lynx became defunct. He then moved to Scipio, where he worked briefly on another newspaper, the Tocsin, before it too went out of business. Weed then returned to the forge in Onondaga, the owner of which had received a contract to produce round shot iron cannonballs for use by U.S. forces during the War of 1812. After earning enough money to resume searching for work as a printer, Weed traveled to Utica, where he was employed in the printing shop of Seward & Williams.

=== Military service ===
In February 1813, Weed was working for and residing in the home of William Williams in Utica, New York. During the War of 1812, he joined a volunteer militia company that Williams commanded as a captain, which responded to threat of a British invasion from Canada, and briefly served near Sackets Harbor. The alarm soon passed, and Weed returned to Utica, where he began work on the Columbian Gazette, a newspaper published by Thomas Walker. When the militia again called for recruits to respond to the threat of an invasion from Canada, Weed obtained Walker's permission to go, and joined a company in the regiment commanded by Elijah H. Metcalf, which performed duty in and around Sackets Harbor.

When the second alarm passed in October 1813, Weed returned to Utica. He soon left for Albany, where he was employed at Webster & Skinner, book publishers and publishers of the Albany Gazette. When his work in Albany ended, Weed lived briefly in Herkimer, then moved to Cooperstown, where he continued to work as a printer. After several months in Cooperstown, he returned to Herkimer to take charge of his former employer's business while the owner traveled to Connecticut to attend a political convention.

In October 1814, Weed again joined the militia and was appointed quartermaster sergeant of the 40th Regiment of the New York State Militia under quartermaster officer George Petrie. Weed's regiment performed duty in Sackets Harbor, and twice successfully paraded to dissuade British commanders on Lake Ontario from landing troops. In January 1815, Weed's regiment was mustered out of the service and he returned to Utica.

=== Arrest and trial ===
While residing in Cooperstown in July 1814, Weed was one of five men arrested the day after a Sunday evening Methodist religious service and accused of harassing several women who had departed the village by wagon after leaving the church. Newspaper publisher Israel W. Clark posted a bond to secure Weed's release, while attorney Ambrose L. Jordan volunteered to act as his counsel. Unbeknownst to Weed, Catherine Ostrander, the daughter of the owners of the Cooperstown rooming house where Weed had been staying, had arranged for his bail and legal representation.

The trial was postponed several times because of events surrounding the war, and took place in early 1815. District attorney Charles P. Kirkland decided to try Weed first, separately from the other defendants. Three of the girls who had been in the wagon denied seeing Weed after the church service. The fourth was Catherine Ostrander, who testified that after leaving the church, she had walked through the village with Weed until they reached the road that led to her home, where she boarded the wagon, after which she had not seen Weed again that night. Jordan opted not to call any witnesses, while Kirkland apologized for not having investigated the story of the initial complainant more fully and offered to dismiss the case. The judge told Jordan he would dismiss the case unless Weed preferred that the jury decide. Wanting his innocence on the record, Weed opted for a jury verdict, and the jurors immediately acquitted him, not even rising from their seats to leave the courtroom for deliberations. The charges against the other defendants were soon dismissed. Weed included the details of his arrest and trial in his autobiography because his political opponents had previously attempted to use it against him. (Weed and Ostrander married in 1818.)

== Continued printing career ==
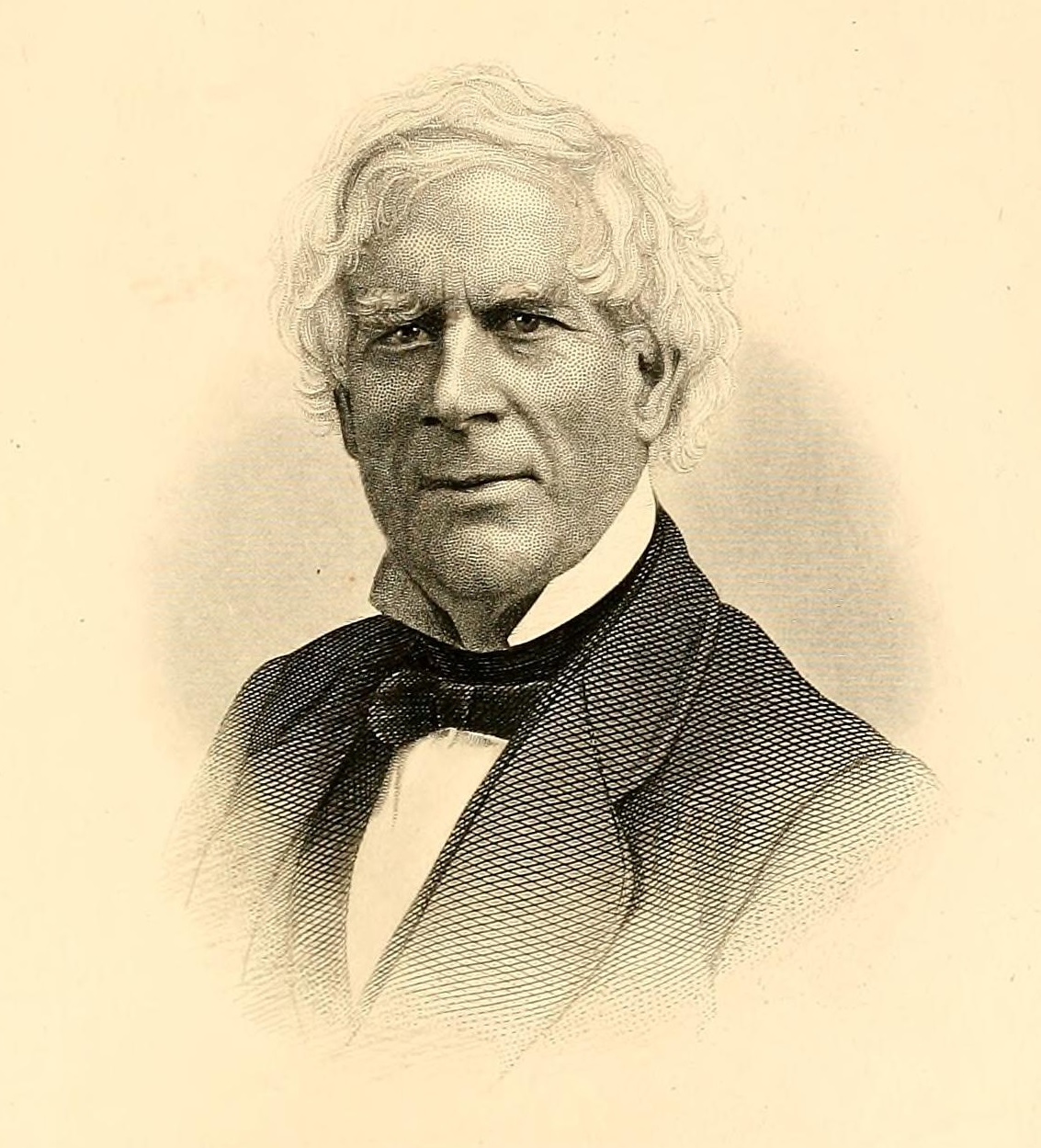
Thurlow Weed, engraved portrait, taken from his autobiography

After Weed's trial, he again enlisted in the militia, but when news of the passage of the Treaty of Ghent that ended the War of 1812 made its way to central New York, Weed's militia company was disbanded. He then traveled to Albany, where he obtained employment running the printing presses for the Albany Register, which was published by Henry C. Southwick and edited by his brother Solomon Southwick. In 1816, Weed moved to the Albany Argus, published by Jesse Buel, whose lucrative appointment as state printer required him to publish state reports, legislative manuals, and legal notices. The additional responsibility Buel delegated to Weed enabled Weed to more than double his salary, and also kindled an interest in politics, since Weed had to set type for or proofread state documents. Weed began attending sessions of the state legislature, and was an early supporter of DeWitt Clinton.

In early 1817, Weed took advantage of a lull in state printing to travel to New York City, where he obtained employment with the Winkle and Wiley book publishing firm. He then moved to a position with the Political Register, which was published by William Cobbett after Cobbett fled England to avoid prosecution for sedition. After leaving Cobbett, Weed worked for several other publishers in New York City, including Jonathan Seymour, James Harper, and William A. Mercien. During his hours away from work, Weed attended the theater frequently and continued to observe political meetings.

In mid-1817, Israel W. Clark, a Cooperstown newspaper editor, purchased the Albany Register from Henry C. Southwick and offered Weed the job of press foreman, so Weed returned to Albany. In addition to running the presses, Weed began to try his hand at composing editorials on the political topics of the day; under Clark's tutelage, he worked to improve his grammar, spelling, and writing style. Over time, he became adept at composing editorials and articles as he set them in type, rather than first preparing a manuscript, which gave him a competitive advantage by enabling him to publish them more quickly than could rival editors.

In 1818, a group of pro-DeWitt Clinton Democratic-Republican political figures purchased the Norwich newspaper and publishing business of John F. Hubbard. This group, which included James Birdsall and Obadiah German, then sold the works to Weed, who moved to Norwich to publish the Agriculturist. Hubbard was later convinced to start a rival paper opposed to Clinton, the Norwich Journal. While living in Norwich, Weed also received a state appointment as commissioner to acknowledge the transfer of deeds and other sale documents, and the two to three dollars in fees he received each month enabled him to continue the Agriculturist during the earliest days of its existence.

Weed recognized in 1820 that Norwich was not able to support two newspapers, and that the anti-DeWitt Clinton faction of New York's Democratic-Republican Party was in the ascendancy, so he sold his publishing works that December and returned to Albany. Weed found employment at the Albany Argus working on documents produced as part of the state printing contract, but when the state printers, Leake & Cantine, discovered that Weed was a Clinton supporter, they discharged him. He then accepted a job with Solomon Southwick as a subscription salesman for Southwick's publications, the Ploughboy and the Christian Visitant. Weed traveled throughout central and western New York on Southwick's behalf in the spring of 1821, but found few new readers willing to sign up to receive Southwick's papers. Discovering that the Federalist-leaning Manlius Times had gone out of business years previously and its printing press was idle, in June Weed purchased the equipment on credit and began publication of the Onondaga Republican.

While living in Manlius, Weed established a close friendship with Addison Gardiner. Gardiner moved to Rochester after attaining admission to the bar in 1822, and suggested to Weed that his prospects might be better there than in Manlius. Weed decided to relocate again, and closed down the Republican. Upon arriving in Rochester, he obtained employment with Everard Peck, the editor of the Telegraph, the city's pro-DeWitt Clinton newspaper, who decided to publish a long-delayed book as a way to provide Weed with temporary employment. Immediately impressed with Weed's talents, Peck hired him to run the day-to-day operations of the Telegraph. In addition to managing the paper during the day, Weed composed its editorial content at night, and soon established the Telegraph as an important pro-Clinton outlet in central and western New York.

== Start of political career ==
In 1824, Weed was a strong backer of the presidential bid of John Quincy Adams; the Rochester Telegraph announced its support in early 1823, and carried his name on the masthead throughout 1823 and 1824. Appointed by Rochester's business leaders as their agent for obtaining a charter for a Rochester-based bank, Weed attended all three sessions of the legislature in 1824, and succeeded in obtaining approval for the Bank of Rochester. Nominated by Monroe County's Adams supporters, Weed was a candidate for the New York State Assembly. He won his race by a significant margin and represented Monroe County in 1825's 48th New York State Legislature. While serving in the Assembly, he befriended William H. Seward, whose legal and political careers were just beginning.

In 1825, Weed bought the Rochester Telegraph. During 1827, he became involved in the controversy surrounding the disappearance of William Morgan, a former Mason who had threatened to publish a book revealing the secrets of Masonic rituals and degree ceremonies. Weed recognized an opportunity to harness sentiment against the Masons and use it to oppose the policies of Democrat Andrew Jackson at the national level, and the Albany Regency of Martin Van Buren at the state level. He was an organizer of the Anti-Masonic Party, and used the pages of the Telegraph to keep Morgan's disappearance in the news. Morgan was presumed to have been carried away by Masons and drowned in the Niagara River. When a body washed ashore in September 1827, many Upstate New York residents assumed it was Morgan's. Though it was positively identified as Canadian Timothy Munro (or Munroe) by his wife, many Anti-Masons persisted in believing it was Morgan's. Weed was alleged to have said the body was a "good enough Morgan" to stoke the controversy until after the upcoming election, a remark Weed denied making. Though the party's 1828 candidate for governor of New York, Solomon Southwick, was defeated, Weed and other organizers succeeded in making it the main opposition to the Democratic Party, and experienced electoral success in several northern states, including Vermont and Pennsylvania.

In 1828, Masons succeeded in forcing Weed out of the Telegraph. In 1829, he was again elected to the Assembly from Monroe County, this time as an Anti-Mason. He served a one-year term in 1830, which included the sessions of the 53rd New York State Legislature. He also started the Albany Evening Journal. The Evening Journal became the largest Anti-Masonic newspaper; Weed was editor, chief reporter, proofreader, and political expert.

In 1832, Weed supported Adams's ally Henry Clay, who ran for president as the candidate of the National Republican Party. He was a strong advocate of Clay's "American System" for economic development, including a national bank, "internal improvements" such as roads and railroads, and a protective tariff.

By 1834, the Adams-Clay organization that had been the National Republicans was forming into the Whig Party. Most Anti-Masons joined the Whigs, regarding the new party as the best alternative to Jackson and Van Buren, and enabling Weed to assume a leadership role in a larger and more orthodox political organization. His Evening Journal became the main Whig newspaper, and by the 1840s it had the largest circulation of any political newspaper in the United States.

Weed and other Whigs worked to blame Van Buren and the Democratic Party for the Panic of 1837. In 1838, he was one of William H. Seward's main supporters in Seward's successful campaign for governor, and was largely credited with Seward's victory. Weed was also a main supporter of William Henry Harrison's successful presidential bid in 1840, in which Harrison defeated Van Buren to become the first Whig president.

In the 1830s and 1840s, Weed became active in the abolitionist movement. When former slave Stephen Myers of Albany began creation of a transportation network and system of safe houses for escaping slaves, Weed was among the prominent individuals to whom he turned for financing. In addition, Weed and his wife made their own home available to fleeing slaves as part of the Underground Railroad.

In 1843, Weed, his son James, and John D. Parsons co-founded Albany's Weed, Parsons & Company, which became a successful book publisher.

== Political organizer ==
Weed was generally seen as the "boss" of New York's Whig Party, using the same tactics as the Regency—patronage and political favors—to attract supporters and keep order in the ranks, efforts he was able to reinforce through the Evening Journal. Under Weed's leadership, the Whigs became the dominant force in state politics for several years, and Weed was arguably the most powerful politician in New York.

As a practical politician, Weed was a pragmatist, rather than an idealist, always taking care to avoid controversial issues and positions that would decrease Whig support on election day. One exception was the issue of slavery, a subject on which Weed made public statements in opposition while trying to avoid the most radical language of those seen as uncompromising abolitionists.

Harrison died in April 1841, only a month after taking office, and was succeeded by John Tyler, a former Democrat, who disappointed Weed by abandoning Whig policies. Weed backed Clay in 1844, but his frustration continued when Clay was narrowly defeated. Following the Mexican–American War, Zachary Taylor emerged as a likely Whig candidate for president, and Weed supported his successful effort. But Taylor, like Harrison, died in office.

Weed played a leading role in the passage of New York's Consolidation Act, which created the New York Central Railroad, at the time the largest corporation in the United States. Weed's role was noteworthy in that he worked for approval of the Consolidation Act largely as a favor to his friend Erastus Corning, one of the financial backers of the project, though Corning was a Democrat and opposed to Weed politically.

Weed used his political influence to effect improvements and reforms in New York City. In 1847, he was largely responsible for the designation of Castle Garden as the main depot for arriving immigrants and the passage of laws to protect them as they entered the United States. His efforts in the mid-1850s led to the creation of the New York Harbor Commission, a state panel that sought to improve commerce by recommending enhancements to New York City's waterways. When construction of Central Park commenced in 1855, Weed played a major role in the selection of the first park commission. As movements for prison reform and reform of charitable services provided by government grew in the mid-19th Century, Weed was largely responsible for the appointment of a non-partisan Board of Charities and Correction for New York City. Weed also influenced efforts to reform the New York City Police Department, including creation of the Board of Police Commissioners.

== 1852 campaign ==
In 1852, the leading Whig candidates for president were incumbent Millard Fillmore, Secretary of State Daniel Webster, and General Winfield Scott. Fillmore, a former Weed protégé, had succeeded to the presidency after the death of Zachary Taylor and rejected Weed's influence. As a result, Weed refused to support him for election to a full term and instead backed Scott. Seward, long a Fillmore rival, also decided to back Scott. Weed concluded during the campaign that support for the unpopular Compromise of 1850 meant the Whig Party was on the verge of disintegrating and destined to lose, so he ensured he would not be blamed by taking an extended trip to Europe, visiting England, France, and Germany among other places. He remained abroad for over a year—well after the November 1852 election, which was won by Democrat Franklin Pierce.

== Republican Party leader ==
=== Founder ===
When Weed returned to the United States, the Whig Party had splintered over the Kansas–Nebraska Act, with southern Whigs leaving the party to join the Democrats, and northern Whigs including Seward, forming the Republican Party as an anti-slavery party and the main opposition to the Democrats. Weed joined the Republicans, and the Evening Journal became a leading Republican newspaper. Weed supported Seward's re-election to the Senate in 1854, and the Republican presidential nomination of John C. Frémont in 1856. Frémont narrowly lost the 1856 election to Democrat James Buchanan.

=== 1860 election ===
Buchanan's failed administration and the fracturing of the Democrats over the slavery issue made likely a Republican victory in 1860. Weed worked for Seward's nomination at the 1860 Republican National Convention, which appeared to most observers to be a foregone conclusion. But Seward's strong anti-slavery views and reputation as a Whig political boss offended many former Democrats in the still new Republican party. Abraham Lincoln's managers exploited these vulnerabilities to obtain Lincoln's nomination. Though disappointed, Weed and Seward both supported Lincoln in the general election. Lincoln won the election handily, defeating John C. Breckinridge, John Bell, and Stephen A. Douglas.

=== Civil War ===
After Lincoln's inauguration, Seward became Secretary of State. Weed became an unofficial envoy and political advisor, with both Seward and Weed providing critical support to Lincoln and the Union during the American Civil War.

In 1861, Weed traveled to Paris with Winfield Scott, where they aided American consul John Bigelow in defusing the Trent Affair, a diplomatic incident with Britain. Later that year, Weed visited Europe with Archbishop John Hughes, and they worked to influence government and public opinion in England and France in favor of the Union.

In December 1862, Lincoln asked Weed to convey a message to Governor Horatio Seymour of New York, a "Peace Democrat", promising to make way for Seymour's succession to the presidency if Seymour would persuade other Peace Democrats to support restoration of the Union. Weed delivered the message, but Seymour took the path of most other Peace Democrats, supporting the Union but remaining critical of what they viewed as the excesses of Lincoln's administration.

In February 1863, Weed undertook a special mission for Lincoln when Lincoln asked him to secretly raise $15,000 (about $390,000 in 2020) for an unspecified purpose. Weed was in New York City when he received a telegram asking him to be in Washington the following morning. When they met the next day, Lincoln explained that there was urgent need for the money and that it could not be taken from any available government appropriations. Weed raised the cash, but Lincoln never explained why he needed it or how it was used.

Weed was critical of Lincoln's decision to issue the Emancipation Proclamation, regarding it as too radical and controversial and unsuccessfully arguing for a system of gradual emancipation. In early 1863, he retired as editor of the Evening Journal because he disagreed with the Radical Republican view on prosecuting the war and post-war Reconstruction, but as a loyal Republican did not want to make this disagreement public. Weed publicly announced his retirement from the printing and publishing business on January 27, 1863. In the ensuing days his "valedictory address" was printed in full in several newspapers.

Federal patronage in New York caused Lincoln difficulty as Weed and his opponents vied for control of government appointments. In 1864, Lincoln appeased Weed by blocking Secretary of the Treasury Salmon P. Chase's choice for a new assistant secretary in charge of the New York sub-treasury, which led to Chase's resignation. Lincoln then ensured he would have Weed's support in the 1864 election by dismissing Hiram Barney, a Radical Republican, as Collector of the Port of New York, and replacing him with Simeon Draper, a Weed ally.

After Lincoln's death and the end of the war, Weed and Seward allied with President Andrew Johnson against the Radical Republicans. Both endorsed Johnson's more conservative approach to Reconstruction and Seward continued as Secretary of State under Johnson.

== Retirement ==
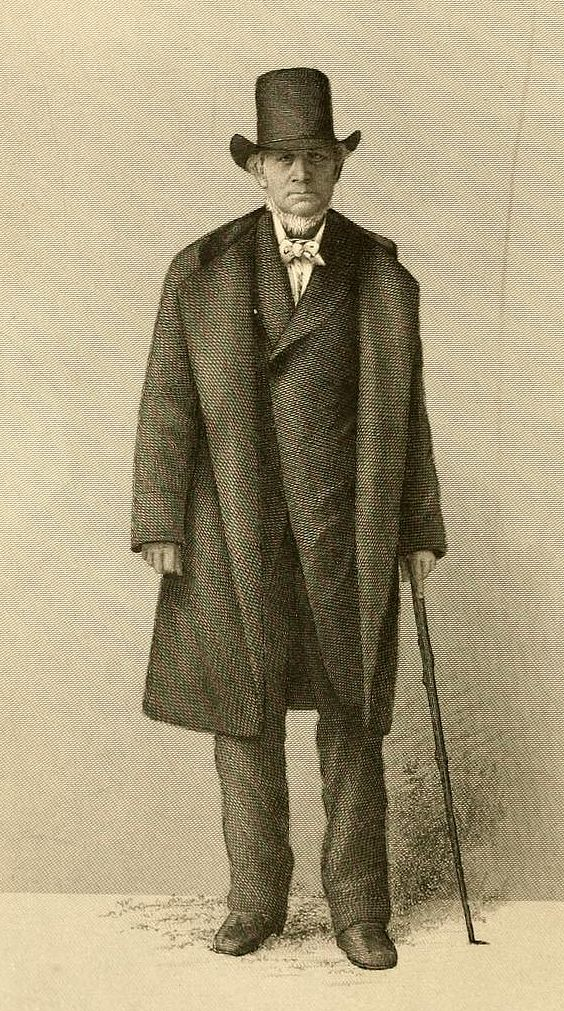
Thurlow Weed in his later years

In 1867 Weed retired from public life and moved from Albany to New York City. He briefly owned and edited a newspaper, the Commercial Advertiser, and remained peripherally engaged in politics, but did not exert the same level of influence that he had had in the past. Weed offered public support to the presidential administration of Ulysses S. Grant. He also engaged in a public feud with Mary Todd Lincoln, who criticized him for opposing efforts to provide her federal financial aid after Lincoln's assassination.

During his later years, Weed wrote frequent letters to authors who sought information on New York's history, especially details on the growth of towns where Weed had lived as a young man. He also resumed work on an autobiography which he had begun in the 1840s, and which was published by his daughter Harriet in 1883. Weed's grandson Thurlow Weed Barnes also published a biography, 1884's Life of Thurlow Weed.

== Death and burial ==
Weed became ill in his final months and suffered from blindness and vertigo. He died in New York City on November 22, 1882. His funeral took place at Manhattan's First Presbyterian Church. Pallbearers included James Watson Webb, Hamilton Fish, Frederick W. Seward, John McKeon, and James Bowen. Attendees included James G. Blaine, William M. Evarts, Edwin D. Morgan, Edwards Pierrepont, Hamilton Fish II, Frederick A. Conkling, and many other current and former office holders and newspaper publishers. Weed was buried at Albany Rural Cemetery.

== Family ==
On April 26, 1818, Weed married Catherine Ostrander (1798–1858) of Cooperstown. They had agreed to marry in 1814, but acceded to the wishes of her parents that they wait until they were older and Weed was more established in his profession. Their children included: James Birdsall (1820–1851), who worked with his father in the publishing business; Harriet Ann (1819–1893), who never married and acted as her father's secretary; Emily (1827–1889), the wife of William Barnes Sr.; and Maria (1823–1896), who married Ogden M. Alden.

Weed's grandson William Barnes Jr. owned and published the Albany Evening Journal. He was also a longtime leader of New York's Republican Party. Weed's granddaughter Catharine Weed Barnes was a well-known photographer.

In addition to authoring Life of Thurlow Weed, grandson Thurlow Weed Barnes (1853–1918) was a publishing executive at Houghton, Mifflin & Co. He also pursued business interests in China as operator of the railroad between Hankou and ports in the province of Shandong.

== Photos ==
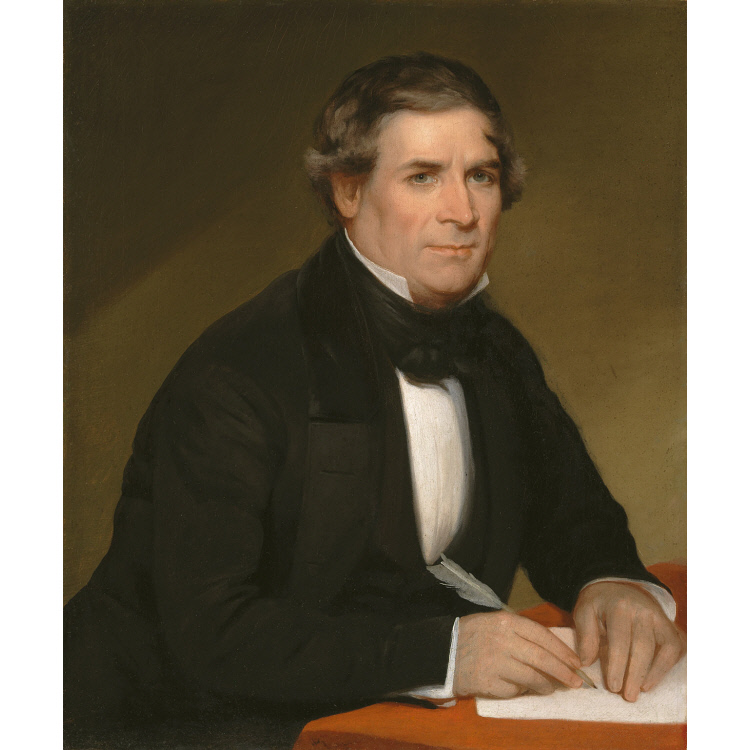
Chester Harding portrait of Weed in 1843

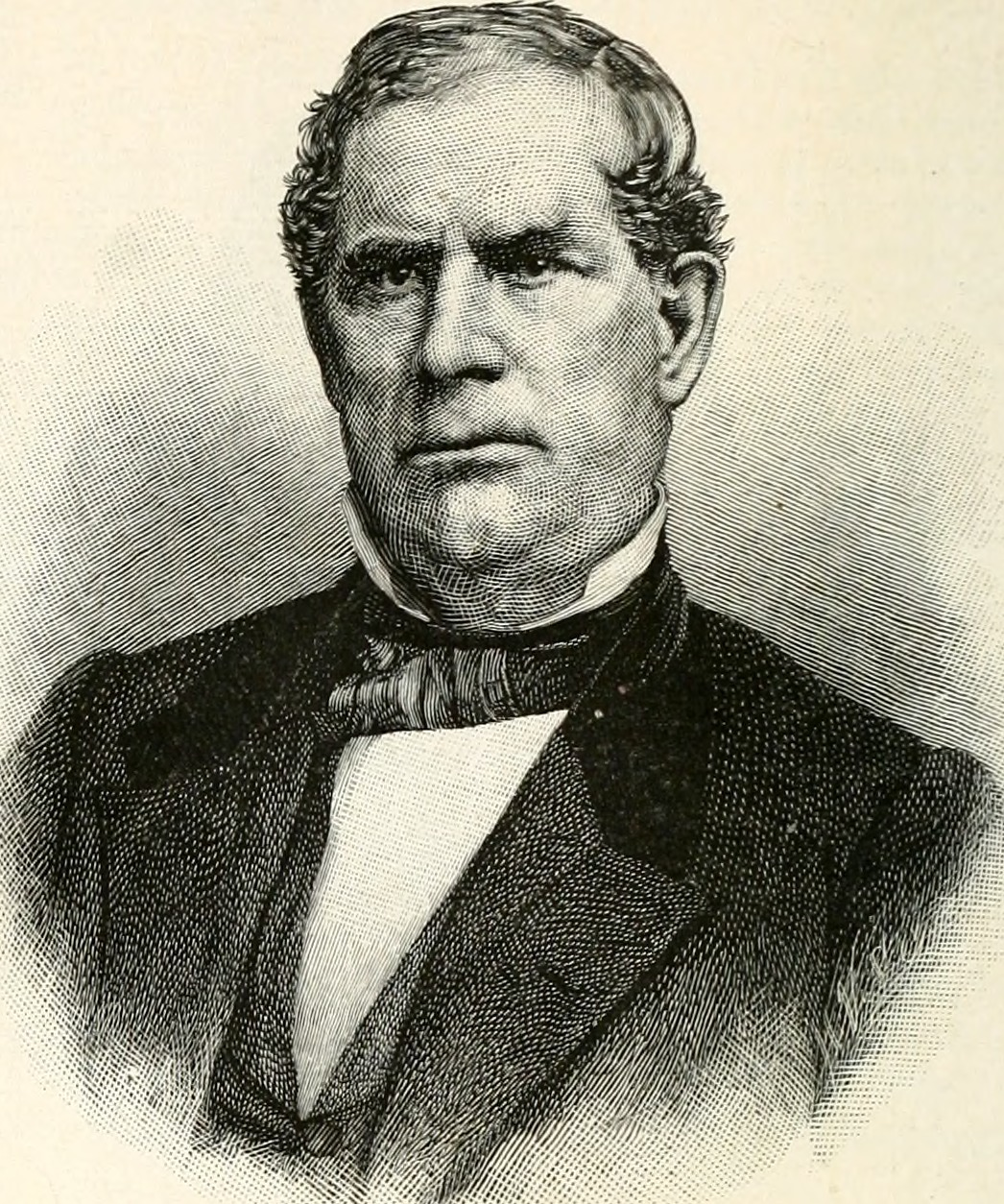
1908 magazine illustration based on 1860 Brady-Handy photograph

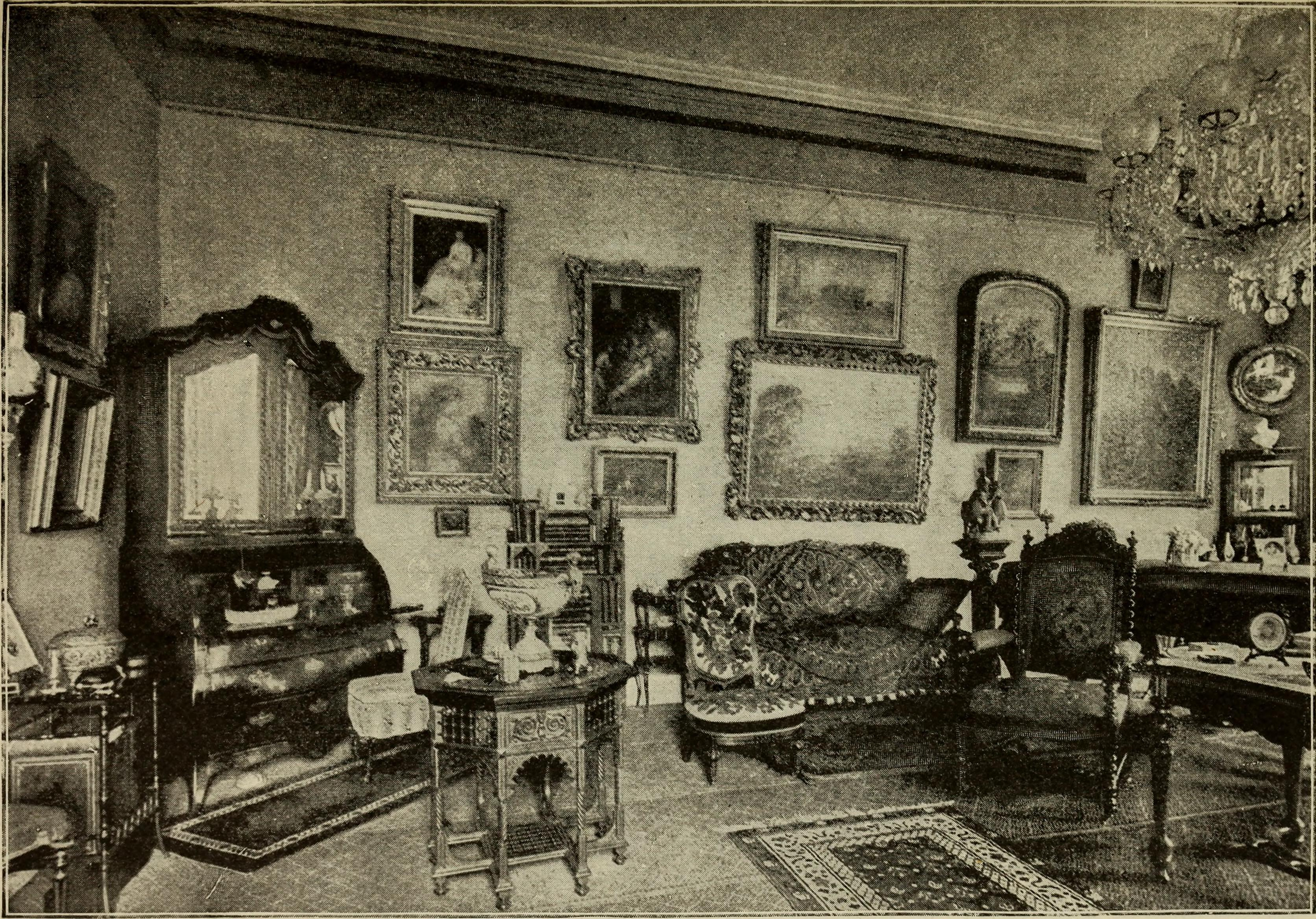
The living room of Weed's New York City home, as depicted in an 1877 magazine article

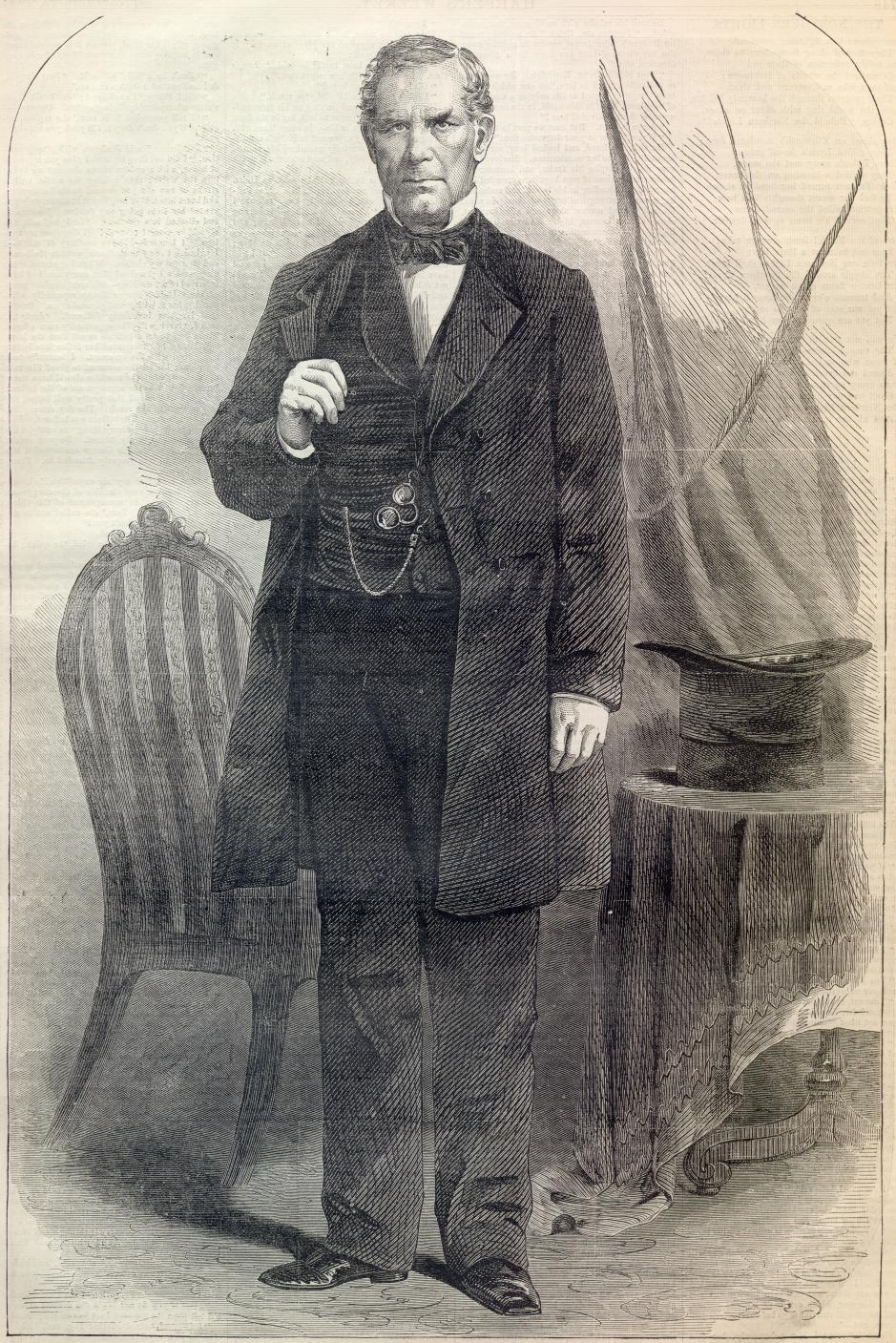
Weed illustration in the November 21, 1861 issue of Harper's Weekly

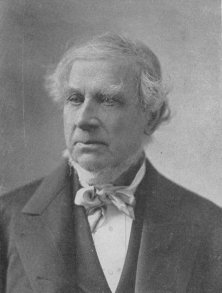
Weed in his later years. From 1901's An Iron Will, by Orison Swett Marden

== See also ==
- Anti-Masonic Enquirer

== Sources ==
=== Books ===
- Alexander, DeAlva Stanwood (1906). A Political History of the State of New York. Vol. I. New York, NY: Henry Holt and Company. ISBN 9781450582308 – via Google Books.
- Anbinder, Tyler (1992). Nativism and Slavery: The Northern Know Nothings and the Politics of the 1850s. New York, NY: Oxford University Press. ISBN 978-0-1950-8922-6 – via Google Books.
- Barnes, Thurlow Weed (1884). Life of Thurlow Weed. Boston, MA: Houghton, Mifflin and Company – via HathiTrust.
- Calarco, Tom (2008). People of the Underground Railroad: A Biographical Dictionary. Westport, CT: Greenwood Press. ISBN 978-0-3133-3924-0 – via Google Books.
- Craig, Adam (1883). Room At the Top, Or, How to Reach Success, Happiness, Fame and Fortune. Chicago, IL: Henry A. Sumner & Company. p. 265 – via Internet Archive.
- Eisenhower, John S. D (1999). Agent of Destiny: The Life and Times of General Winfield Scott. Norman, OK: University of Oklahoma Press. ISBN 978-0-8061-3128-3 – via Google Books.
- Formisano, Ronald P. (2008). For the People: American Populist Movements from the Revolution to the 1850s. Chapel Hill, NC: University of North Carolina Press. ISBN 978-0-8078-8611-3 – via Google Books.
- Gerber, Morris (1961). Old Albany. Vol. 4. Saratoga Springs, NY: Portofino Publishing.
- Good, Timothy S. (2009). Lincoln for President: An Underdog's Path to the 1860 Republican Nomination. Jefferson, NC: McFarland & Company. ISBN 978-0-7864-3957-7 – via Google Books.
- Guelzo, Allen C. (2004). Lincoln's Emancipation Proclamation: The End of Slavery in America. New York, NY: Smon & Schuster. p. 137. ISBN 978-0-7432-6297-2 – via Internet Archive.
- Heisser, David C. R.; White, Stephen J. Sr. (January 27, 2015). Patrick N. Lynch, 1817-1882: Third Catholic Bishop of Charleston. Columbia, SC: University of South Carolina Press. ISBN 978-1-6111-7405-2 – via Google Books.
- Laone, Ronald; Laone, Jay (March 16, 2012). The Republican Party: A Father-And-Son Review of GOP History. Bloomington, IN: iUniverse. ISBN 978-1-4697-4705-7 – via Google Books.
- Nester, William R. (2013). The Age of Jackson and the Art of American Power, 1815–1848. Washington, DC: Potomac Books. ISBN 978-1-61234-605-2 – via Google Books.
- Neu, Irene D. (1960). Erastus Corning: Merchant and Financier, 1794–1872. Ithaca, NY: Cornell University Press. ISBN 978-1-5017-2914-0 – via Google Books.
- Onofrio, Jan (January 1999). Pennsylvania Biographical Dictionary. Vol. 1. St. Clair Shores, MI: Somerset Publishers. ISBN 978-0-4030-9950-4 – via Google Books.
- Ostrander, Emmett; Ostrander, Vinton Pierce; Ostrander, Collin (1999). Ostrander: A Genealogical Record, 1660–1995. Marceline, MO: Walsworth Publishing Company – via Google Books.
- Pasko, Wesley Washington (1894). American Dictionary of Printing and Bookmaking. New York, NY: Howard Lockwood & Co. p. 584 – via Internet Archive.
- Snay, Mitchell (2011). Horace Greeley and the Politics of Reform in Nineteenth-Century America. Lanham, MD: Rowman & Littlefield. ISBN 978-0-7425-5100-8 – via Google Books.
- Snodgrass, Mary Ellen (2015). The Underground Railroad: An Encyclopedia of People, Places, and Operations. Vol. 1–2. New York, NY: Routledge. ISBN 978-1-3174-5416-8 – via Google Books.
- Tanner, Hudson C. (1888). "The Lobby," and Public Men from Thurlow Weed's Time. Albany, NY: George MacDonald – via Google Books.
- Weed, Thurlow (1883). Weed, Harriet A. (ed.). Autobiography of Thurlow Weed. New York, NY: Houghton, Mifflin and Company.
- Wilson, J. G.; Fiske, J., eds. (1889). "Weed, Thurlow" . Appletons' Cyclopædia of American Biography. New York: D. Appleton.
- Whitman, T. Steven (2012). Antietam 1862: Gateway to Emancipation. Santa Barbara, CA: ABC CLIO. ISBN 978-0-3133-9734-9 – via Google Books.
- Williams, Robert C. (2006). Horace Greeley: Champion of American Freedom. New York, NY: New York University Press. p. 44. ISBN 978-0-8147-9402-9 – via Internet Archive.

=== Newspapers ===
- "Death of James B. Weed". Watertown Chronicle. Watertown, WI. July 2, 1851 – via Newspapers.com.
- Weed, Thurlow (January 29, 1863). "Thurlow Weed's Valedictory". Buffalo Commercial Advertiser. Buffalo, NY – via Newspapers.com.
- "Thurlow Weed has purchased an interest in the Commercial Advertiser". The Wheeling Daily Intelligencer. Wheeling, WV. March 4, 1867 – via Newspapers.com.
- "Death of Thurlow Weed". Brooklyn Daily Eagle. Brooklyn, NY. November 22, 1882 – via Newspapers.com.
- "Passed Away: Thurlow Weed, Journalist and Statesman". Brooklyn Daily Eagle. Brooklyn, NY. November 22, 1882 – via Newspapers.com.
- "Dust to Dust: Impressive Funeral Services of the Late Thurlow Weed". Brooklyn Daily Eagle. Brooklyn, NY. November 24, 1882 – via Newspapers.com.
- "Personal: Thurlow Weed". The Morning News. Wilmington, DE. February 8, 1883 – via Newspapers.com.
- "Table Gossip: Mr. and Mrs. Thurlow Weed Barnes". The Boston Globe. Boston, MA. February 3, 1884 – via Newspapers.com.
- "Thurlow Weed's Daughter: Death of Mrs. Emily Weed Barnes". Buffalo Express. Buffalo, NY. February 11, 1889 – via Newspapers.com.
- "An Eventful Life Ended: Harriet A. Weed Dies Among her Father's Treasures". The New York Times. New York, NY. November 2, 1893 – via Newspapers.com.
- "Funeral of Mrs. Alden". Star-Gazette. Elmira, NY. January 29, 1896 – via Newspapers.com.
- "Thurlow Weed Barnes Dies in this City". New-York Tribune. New York, NY. June 28, 1918 – via Newspapers.com.
- "Barnes Genius At Setting up Political Machine". Binghamton Press. Binghamton, NY. June 26, 1930 – via Newspapers.com.
- Grondahl, Paul (December 5, 2013). "Thurlow Weed (1797–1882): Republican boss, Lincoln adviser, newspaper publisher". Times Union. Colonie, NY.

=== Magazines ===
- Adams, W. I. Lincoln, ed. (August 29, 1890). "Miss Catharine Weed Barnes". The Photographic Times. Vol. XX, no. 467. New York, NY: The Photographic Times Publishing Association – via Google Books.
- Eriksson, Erik McKinley (November 1925). "Thurlow Weed: Anti-Masonic Editor and Politician". Grand Lodge Bulletin. Vol. XXIV–XXVI. Cedar Rapids, IA: Grand Lodge of Iowa, Ancient Free and Accepted Masons – via Google Books.
- Van Deusen, Glyndon G. (April 1, 1944). "Thurlow Weed: A Character Study". The American Historical Review. Oxford, England, UK: Oxford University Press. JSTOR 1841027.

=== Internet ===
- "Biography, Thurlow Weed". Crisis at Fort Sumter. New Orleans, LA: Tulane University.
- "Biography, William H. Seward". Crisis at Fort Sumter. New Orleans, LA: Tulane University.
- "Historic Marker: Thurlow Weed, Acra, New York". WGP Foundation.org. Syracuse, NY: William G. Pomeroy Foundation. December 19, 2018.
- "American History: 1840 U.S. Presidential Campaign". History Net.com. Leesburg, VA: World History Group. June 12, 2006.
- "1860 Republican Convention". America's Civil War. Georgia's Blue and Gray Trail. Archived from the original on May 5, 2015.
- Leidner, Gordon (2019). "How Lincoln Won the 1860 Republican Nomination". Great American History.
- "Notable Visitors: Thurlow Weed (1797–1882)". Mr. Lincoln's White House. New York, NY: The Lehrman Institute. 2016.
- "The Election of 1860". US History.org. Philadelphia, PA: Independence Hall Association.
- "The Journalists: Thurlow Weed (1797–1882)". Mr. Lincoln and Friends. Philadelphia, PA: Independence Hall Association. 2016.
