= What Digital Camera =

- Editor: Nigel Atherton
- Categories: Digital cameras
- Circulation: 14,978 (ABC Jan - Dec 2013); Print and digital editions.
- Publisher: TI Media
- First issue: 14 August 2003
- Final issue: December 2016
- Country: United Kingdom
- Language: English
- Website: www.whatdigitalcamera.com

What Digital Camera was a monthly magazine and website about digital cameras published by TI Media. Its editor was Nigel Atherton.

== History ==
The magazine was launched fully after a few one-off editions on 14 August 2003 and describes itself as "world's oldest digital photography magazine". Its last issue was published in December 2016.
