= Alabama Claims =

US-UK disagreement over naval affairs

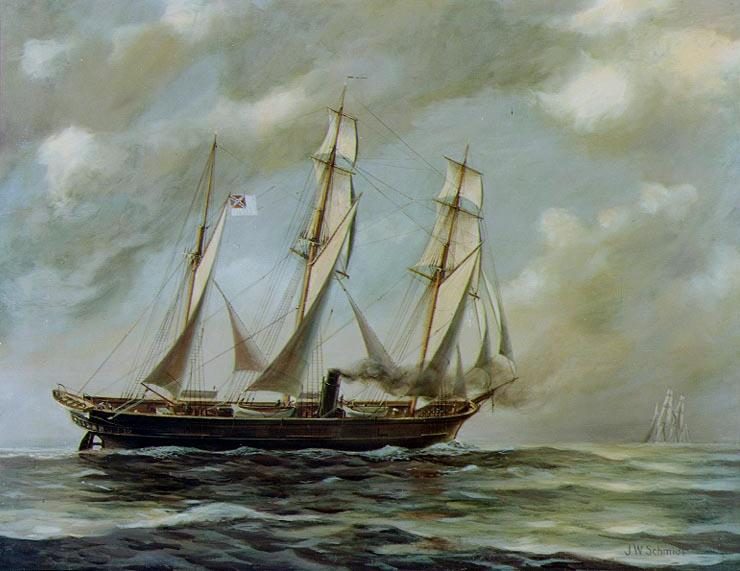
Painting of the CSS Alabama, the Confederate raider built in Britain.

The Alabama Claims were a series of demands for damages sought by the government of the United States from the United Kingdom in 1869, for the attacks upon Union merchant ships by Confederate Navy commerce raiders built in British shipyards during the American Civil War. The claims focused chiefly on the most famous of these raiders, the CSS Alabama, which took more than sixty prizes before she was sunk off the French coast in 1864.

After international arbitration endorsed the American position in 1872, Britain settled the matter by paying the United States $15.5 million, ending the dispute and leading to a treaty that restored friendly relations between Britain and the United States. That international arbitration established a precedent, and the case aroused interest in codifying public international law. The case too resulted in the warming of relations between Britain and the US, which had begun the 1800s as rivals, and ended the century as something of partners.

== British political involvement ==
The British Prime Minister Lord Palmerston and Foreign Secretary Lord John Russell failed to stop the Alabama from putting to sea from the shipyards of John Laird Sons and Company in Birkenhead. The United States Legation in London had explicitly opposed this, and the American Minister to Britain, Charles Francis Adams, charged that the ship was bound for the Confederacy, where it would be used against the United States.

Though both the Prime Minister and Foreign Secretary were thought to favor the Confederacy at the time of Alabama's construction, British public opinion was divided on the issue, and MPs such as Richard Cobden campaigned against it. The subsequent departure of the Alabama proved to be publicly embarrassing, and Palmerston and Russell were later forced to admit that the ship should not have been allowed to depart. The Government had requested advice from the Lord Chief Justice of England and Wales, Sir Alexander Cockburn, who ruled that her release did not violate Britain's neutrality, because she was not outfitted with guns at the time that she left British ports.

In the next year, Britain detained two ironclad warships constructed in Birkenhead and destined for the Confederacy. As a result of the uproar over the Alabama, Palmerston instructed the British Admiralty to tender an offer for the purchase of the ships. They had been bought by a go-between, Monsieur Bravay of Paris (who had ordered their construction as an intermediary for Confederate principals).

John Bull (Great Britain) is dwarfed by a gigantic inflated American "Alabama Claim" cartoon in Punch--or the London Charivari 22 Jan 1872.

== The claims ==
In what were called the Alabama Claims, in 1869 the United States claimed direct and collateral damage against Great Britain. In the particular case of the Alabama, the United States claimed that Britain had violated neutrality by allowing five warships to be constructed, especially the Alabama, knowing that it would eventually enter into naval service with the Confederacy.

Other particulars included the following: In the summer of 1862, the British-built steam warship Oreto was delivered to Nassau in the Bahamas with the secret understanding that it would be later transferred to the Confederate States Navy. Upon transfer, it was commissioned CSS Florida. British Royal Navy Admiral George Willes Watson (1827–1897) aided the transfer, and Watson's actions were reviewed by the tribunal.

Other warships included the CSS Shenandoah (built at Alexander Stephen and Sons in Glasgow), CSS Lark (built at John Laird and Sons, like the Alabama), and CSS Tallahassee (built at J & W Dudgeon in London).

Senator Charles Sumner of Massachusetts, the chairman of the U.S. Senate Foreign Relations Committee, also demanded that "indirect damages" be included, specifically the British blockade runners. British blockade runners played a pivotal role in sustaining the war effort of the Confederacy, smuggling through the Union blockade thousands of tons of gunpowder, half a million rifles, and several hundred cannons to the Confederacy. Such acts may have lengthened the Civil War by two years and cost 400,000 more lives of soldiers and civilians on both sides.

=== Payment ===
Sumner originally asked for $2 billion in damages, or alternatively, the ceding of Canada to the United States. When American Secretary of State William H. Seward negotiated the Alaska Purchase in 1867, he intended it as the first step in a comprehensive plan to gain control of the entire northwest Pacific Coast. Seward was a firm believer in "Manifest Destiny", primarily for its commercial advantages to the United States. Seward expected the West Coast Province of British Columbia to seek annexation to the United States and thought Britain might accept this in exchange for the Alabama claims. Soon other U.S. politicians endorsed annexation, with the goal of annexing British Columbia, the central Canadian Red River Colony (later Manitoba), and eastern Nova Scotia, in exchange for dropping the damage claims.

The idea reached a peak in the spring and summer of 1870, with American expansionists, Canadian separatists, and British anti-imperialists seemingly combining forces. The plan was dropped for several reasons: London continued to stall, American commercial and financial groups pressed Washington for a quick settlement of the dispute in cash, Canada offered to have British Columbia enter the Canadian Confederation on very generous terms, which bolstered nationalist sentiment in British Columbia that already favored fealty to the British Empire, Congress became preoccupied with Reconstruction, and most Americans showed little interest in territorial expansion after the long years, expenses and losses of the Civil War.

=== Treaty of Washington ===
In 1871, Hamilton Fish, President Ulysses S. Grant's Secretary of State, worked out an agreement with British representative Sir John Rose to create a commission in Washington comprising six members from the British Empire and six members from the United States. Its assignment was to resolve the Alabama claims, refinancing, and other international disputes between Canada and the United States by treaty. On March 8, 1871, the Treaty of Washington was signed at the State Department and the U.S. Senate ratified the treaty on May 24, 1871. In accord with the treaty, an international arbitration tribunal met in Geneva. The treaty had provisions regarding the settlement process for the Alabama Claims but did not include "indirect damages", settled disputed Atlantic fisheries and the San Juan Boundary (concerning the Oregon boundary line). Britain and the United States became perpetual allies after the treaty, with Britain having expressed regret over the Alabama damages.

== The tribunal ==
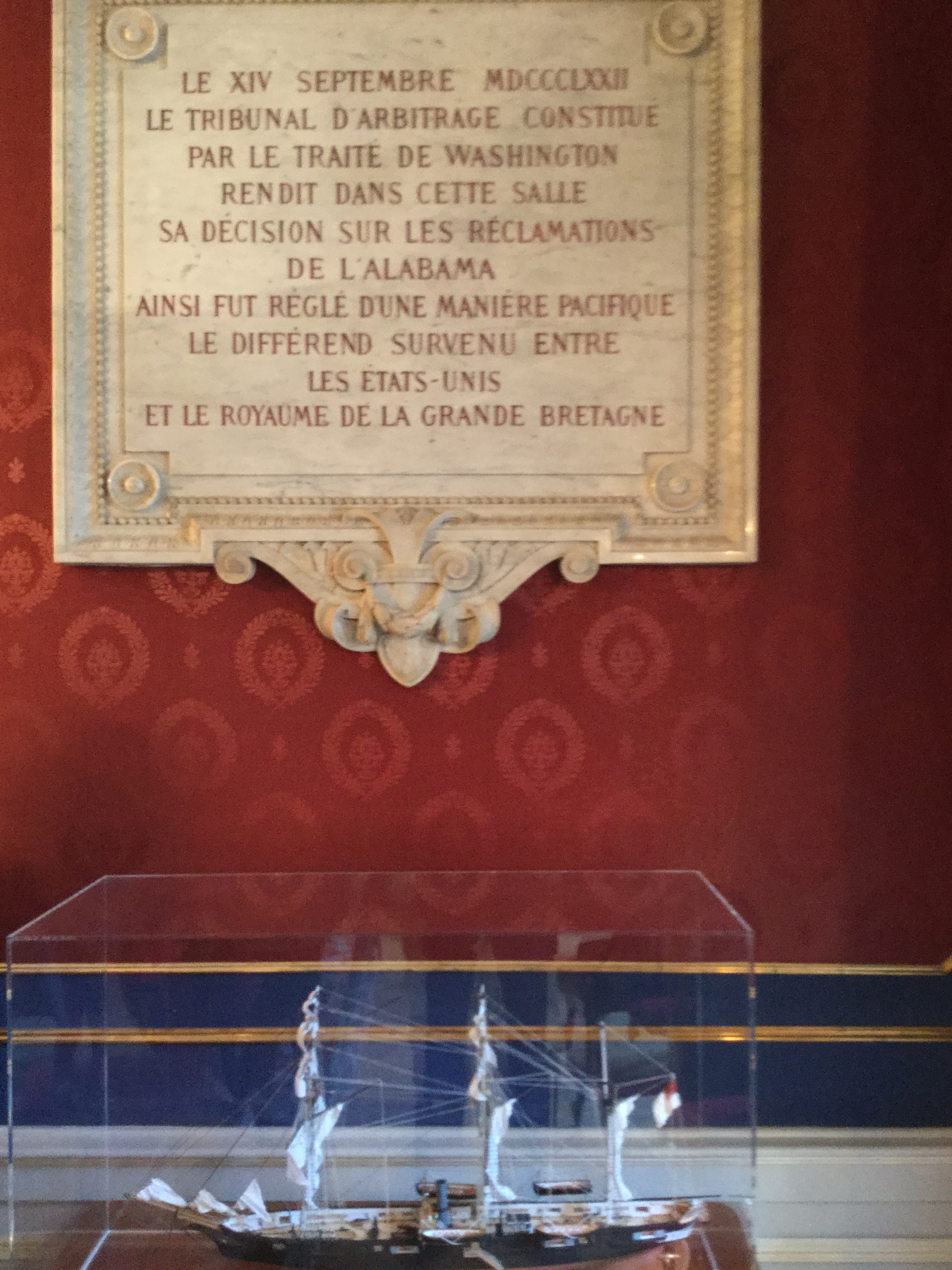
Commemorative plate and model of the CSS Alabama in the Salle de l'Alabama of the Geneva town hall.

The tribunal was composed of representatives:

- Britain: Sir Alexander Cockburn
- United States: Charles Francis Adams, with William Maxwell Evarts serving as counsel
- Italy: Federico Sclopis
- Switzerland: Jakob Stämpfli
- Brazil: Marcos Antônio de Araújo, Viscount of Itajubá.

Negotiations had taken place in Suitland, Maryland, at the estate of businessman Samuel Taylor Suit. The tribunal session was held in a reception room of the Town Hall in Geneva, Switzerland. This has been named salle de l'Alabama.

The final award of $15,500,000 formed part of the Treaty of Washington and was paid out by Great Britain on September 8, 1873. This was balanced against damages of $1,929,819 paid by the United States to Great Britain for illegal Union blockade practices and ceded fishing privileges.

== Legacy ==
This established the principle of international arbitration and launched a movement to codify public international law with hopes for finding peaceful solutions to international disputes. The arbitration of the Alabama claims was a precursor to the Hague Convention, the League of Nations, the World Court, and the United Nations. The Alabama Claims inspired international jurist Gustave Moynier to pursue legal arrangements to enforce international treaties in the 1870s. The Soviet Union carefully studied the Alabama claims when assessing whether it could claim damages in response to Allied intervention in the Russian Civil War.

According to Vladimir Nabokov, the core incident has a legacy in literary reference, being used as a plot device in Anna Karenina, by Leo Tolstoy. In one early passage, Stiva Oblonsky has a dream that may show his having read of the Alabama Claims through the Kölnische Zeitung. In the Jules Verne novel Around the World in Eighty Days, Inspector Fix warns Phileas Fogg that the riot they encounter in San Francisco may be connected to the claim.

== See also ==
- Blockade runners of the American Civil War
- The Great Rapprochement
- Prize (law)

== Bibliography ==
- Adams, E. D. (1924). Great Britain and the American Civil War. New York: Russell & Russell. (see external links)
- Balch, T. W. (1900). The Alabama Arbitration. Philadelphia: Allen, Lane & Scott.
- Beaman, C. C. (1871). The National and Private Alabama Claims and their Final and Amicable Settlement. Washington: W. H. Moore., reprinted in the Michigan Historical Reprint Series, ISBN 1-4181-2980-1
- Bingham, T. (2005). "The Alabama Claims Arbitration". International and Comparative Law Quarterly. 50: 1–25. doi:10.1093/iclq/54.1.1., reprinted in Bingham, T. (2011). Lives of the Law: Selected Essays and Speeches 2000-2010. Oxford: Oxford University Press. pp. 13–40. ISBN 978-0-19-969730-4.
- Blegen, Theodore C. "A Plan for the Union of British North America and the United States, 1866." Mississippi Valley Historical Review 4.4 (1918): 470-483 online.
- Bowen, C. S. C. (1868). The Alabama Claims and Arbitration Considered from a Legal Point of View. London.
- Cook, Adrian. (1975). The Alabama Claims. Ithaca, N.Y.: Cornell University Press. ISBN 9780801408939., the standard scholarly history
- deKay, T. (2003). The Rebel Raiders: The Warship "Alabama", British Treachery and the American Civil War. London: Pimlico. ISBN 0-7126-6490-4.
