= Robert Weeks =

Robert Weeks may refer to:

- Robert Doughty Weeks (1795–1854), American banker
- Robert Kelley Weeks (1840–1876), American poet
- Robert H. Weeks (1930–2008), American politician
