= Van Benschoten (surname) =

Van Benschoten is a Dutch toponymic surname meaning "from Bunschoten", a municipality in Utrecht. The name originates with Theunis Eliasen, a seventeenth-century settler from Bunschoten to upstate New York, and was originally (and alternatively) rendered Van Bunschoten. Notable people with the Van Benschoten surname include:

- Anna Lavinia Van Benschoten (1866–1927), American mathematician
- John Van Benschoten (b. 1980), American baseball player
- Mary Crowell Van Benschoten (1840–1921), American writer
- William H. Van Benschoten (1872–1928), American lawyer

== See also ==
- James Van Benschoten Bennett (1894–1978), American penal reformer
- Van Benschoten House and Guest House, an historic property in Margaretville, New York
- Elias Van Bunschooten House, an historic property in Wantage Township, New Jersey
