= Benjamin Aymar Sands =

American lawyer (1853–1917)

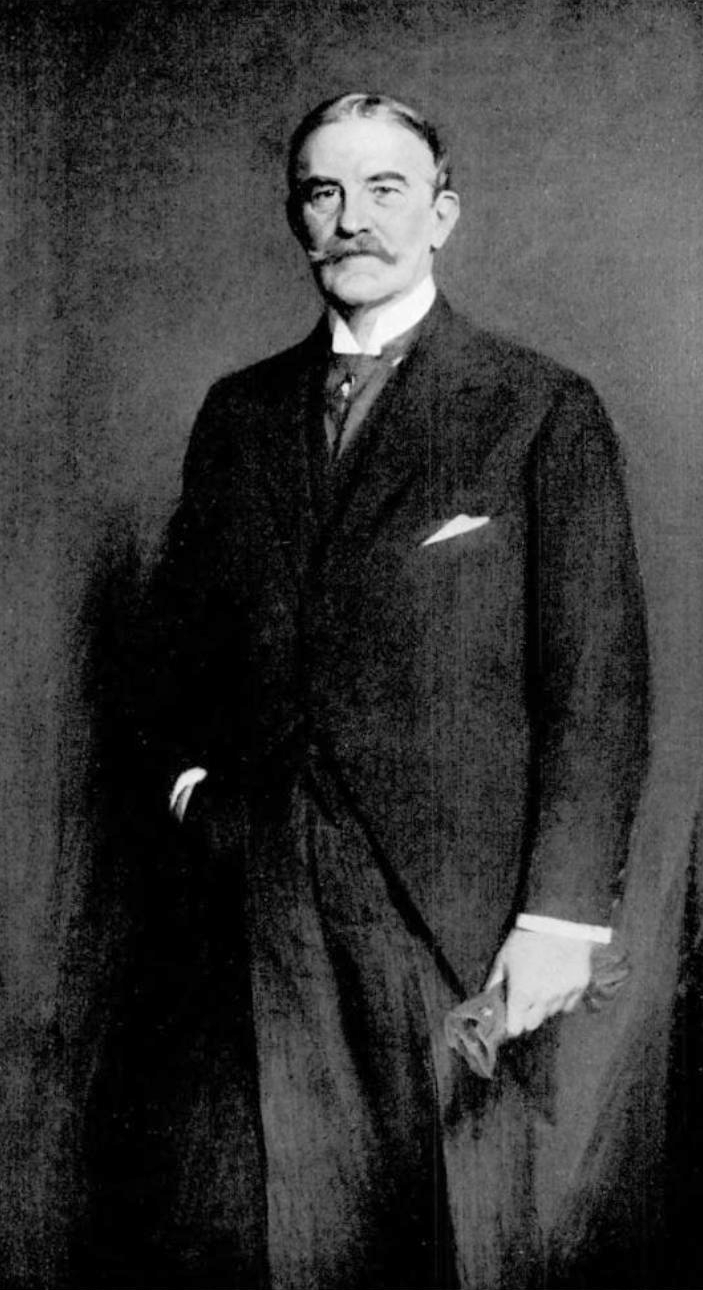
- Born: June 27, 1853; New York, New York
- Died: May 1, 1917 (aged 63); New York, New York
- Burial place: Green-Wood Cemetery
- Education: Columbia College; Columbia Law School
- Occupation: Lawyer
- Spouse: Amy K. Aiken (m. 1878)

Benjamin Aymar Sands (July 27, 1853 – May 1, 1917) was an American lawyer from New York.

== Early life ==
Sands was born on July 27, 1853, at 80 Fifth Avenue in New York City, New York, the son of Samuel Stevens Sands and Mary Emily Ellis Aymar.

Sands attended Columbia College, graduating from there with an A.B. in 1874. Two years later, he graduated from Columbia Law School with an LL.B. and was admitted to the bar.

== Career ==
He initially practiced law as a member of the firm Webb and Sprague. In 1882, he helped organize the firm Bowers and Sands, which lasted until his death. He largely practiced corporation law and was employed as counsel in a number of litigations by many large financial and railroad companies. He was well known as a corporate lawyer and was considered an authority on real estate titles. In 1886, he was appointed receiver of the Indianapolis, Decatur and Springfield Railroad, a position he served as until 1892. He was vice-president of the Colorado Midland Railway from 1891 to 1901, vice-president of the American Mortgage Company and the State Investing Company, a trustee of the Greenwich Savings Bank, chairman of the board of North British and Mercantile Insurance Company of London and Edinburgh, a director and executive committee member of the Terminal Warehouse Company, the Lincoln Trust Company, and the Fidelity Bank and Commonwealth Insurance Company, a director and auditing committee member of the United States Safe Deposit Company, and a director of the Mortgage Bond Company and the New York Trust Company.

Sands' first law firm, Webb & Sprague, was a partnership he formed with H. Walter Webb, Henry L. Sprague, and Robert C. Cornell. He formed his second law firm, Platt & Bowers, with John M. Bowers and James N. Platt. The firm was renamed Bowers & Sands after Platt's death. In 1898, Frederic J. Middlebrook, James W. Gerard, and Latham G. Reed became partners in the firm. Gerard, who later became a New York Supreme Court Justice and United States Ambassador to Germany, retired from the firm in 1908. In 1911, William H. Van Benschoten became a member of the firm. In 1915, Latham G. Reed retired from the firm while Middleton S. Borland and Frank H. Sincerbeaux became associated with the firm.

Sands' law firm, later known as Platt, Bowers & Sands, was the successor of the firm Gerard & Platt, which was founded in 1828. He was an advocate of the Mortgage Tax Law, which was enacted and proved a boon to New York City real estate interests. A member of the Republican Party, he was a presidential elector in the 1904 presidential election and president of the Republican Club of the 27th Assembly District in 1905.

=== Other interests ===
Sands was an executive committee member of the New York City Bar Association. He was a member of the Union Club, the City Club, the Down Town Association, the St. Andrew's Society, and the Society of Colonial Wars. He was a Governor of the University Club for many years, and he served as its president from 1910 to 1913. He was also a fellow of the Metropolitan Museum of Art and a trustee of Columbia University. He was an Episcopalian.

== Personal life ==
In 1878, he married Amy Kirby Aiken, a daughter of William H. Akin. Together, they were the parents of one daughter:

- Mary Emily "May" Sands (1879–1941), who married Hon. Hugh Melville Howard, youngest son of Cecil Howard, 6th Earl of Wicklow, in 1908.

Sands died at home in New York on May 1, 1917. He was buried in Green-Wood Cemetery.

=== Descendants ===
Through his daughter May, he was a grandfather of Cecil Aymar Howard, 9th Earl of Wicklow (1909–1977) and Katharine Frances Theodosia Howard (1910–1990), neither of whom married.
