= Theodore William Dwight =

American educator and jurist (1822 - 1892)

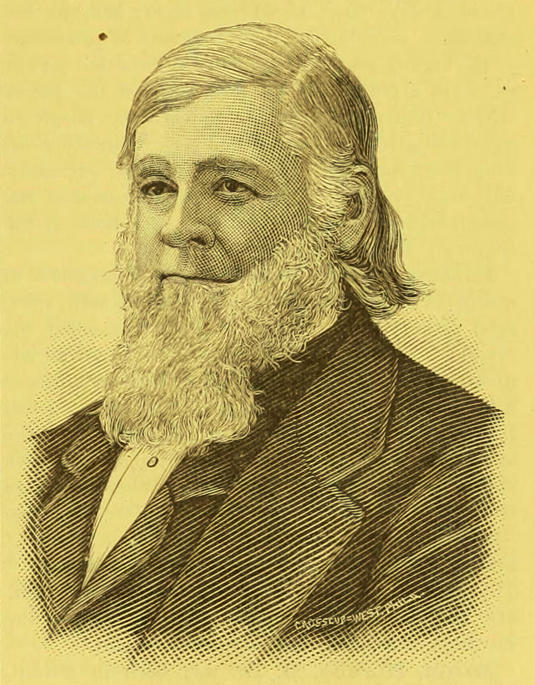
- Born: July 18, 1822; Catskill, New York
- Died: June 18, 1892 (aged 69); Clinton, New York
- Education: Hamilton College; Yale University
- Occupations: Jurist, educator
- Political party: Republican

Theodore William Dwight (1822–1892) was an American jurist and educator, cousin of Theodore Dwight Woolsey and of Timothy Dwight V. He founded Columbia Law School in 1858 and New York Law School in 1891.

== Early life and education ==
Theodore William Dwight was born in Catskill, New York on July 18, 1822. His father was Benjamin Woolsey Dwight (1780–1850), a physician and merchant, and his grandfather was Timothy Dwight IV (1752–1817), a prominent theologian, educator, author, and president of Yale University from 1795 to 1817. Theodore Dwight graduated from Hamilton College in 1840. At Hamilton, he was a member of the Alpha Delta Phi fraternity. He also later studied physics under Samuel F.B. Morse and John William Draper.

== Career ==
Dwight taught classics at Utica Academy in 1840–1841. He studied law at Yale and was admitted to the bar in 1845. Between 1842 and 1858, he taught at Hamilton, first as tutor and later as professor of law, history, civil polity, and political economy. In 1853 he became dean of the Hamilton Law School.

In 1858, he accepted an invitation to develop a department of law at Columbia. In 1860, the New York State Legislature passed a law allowing graduates of the program to bypass the bar exam and be seated to the New York Bar. However, this was declared unconstitutional by state court judges a decision that was appealed by Professor Dwight. By 1864, graduates of the program could be admitted to the bar without further examination.

Dwight was the sole professor of law at Columbia until the department was expanded in 1873, eventually becoming Columbia Law School. He served as the dean at Columbia Law School until 1891. That year, he and other faculty, students, and alumni protested the Columbia trustees' attempts to convert the law school to the case method, and left to found New York Law School.

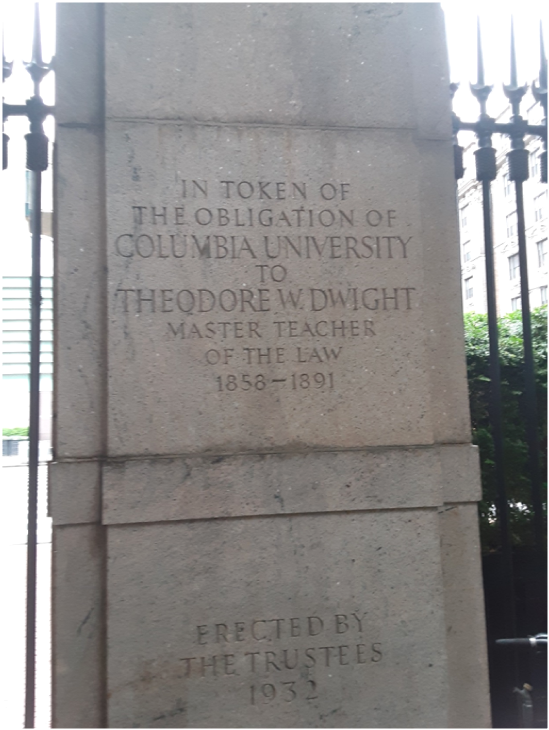
The backside of the column on the east side of Columbia University's College Walk at 116th and Amsterdam is dedicated to Dwight.

At Columbia, Dwight was the creator of the Dwight method of legal instruction, which emphasized memorization of treatises, practice drills, and frequent moot courts. The Dwight method was in competition with the case method developed by Christopher Columbus Langdell, then Dean of Harvard, which emphasized the study of individual cases, and inductive reasoning. As described by Columbia Professor Peter L. Strauss, "Where Dwight aimed to give a sound knowledge of the law to men of average ability, Harvard's case method aimed to give as much intellectual stimulation as possible to those who would become the profession's elite." Today, the more abstract case method dominates legal education, even at New York Law School. However, the Dwight method, while not described as such, is still used in some law schools. Dwight-like memorization techniques are also widely used to prepare for state bar exams.

A Republican, Dwight was also a prominent figure in political and social reforms. In 1873, Governor John Dix appointed Dwight a member of the commission of appeals, which in 1874–1875 aided the New York Court of Appeals to clear its docket. In 1886, he served as counsel for five Andover Theological Seminary professors charged with heresy. Dwight was particularly interested in prison reform; he collaborated on A Report on Prisons and Reformatories in the United States and Canada (1867), served as president of the New York Prison Association, and was a delegate to the International Prison Congress at Stockholm in 1878. He helped draw up the bill for the establishment of the Elmira Reformatory and wrote an early report that helped lead to the organization the State Charities Aid Association.

Dwight edited Sir Henry Maine's Ancient Law; was associate editor of the American Law Register and legal editor of Johnson's Cyclopaedia; and published Charitable Uses: Argument in the Rose Will Case (1863). He was a non-resident professor of law at Cornell (1869–1871) and at Amherst (1870–1872). Dwight was also a president of the University Club of New York from 1865 to 1867.

== Death ==
Dwight died in Clinton, New York, on June 18, 1892. He died while in the act of signing his will. Because he had not finished writing his signature by the time he died, the will was not enforced.

Academic offices
Preceded by none	Dean of Columbia Law School; 1858–1891	Succeeded by William A. Keener
