= Edmund Wetmore =

American lawyer

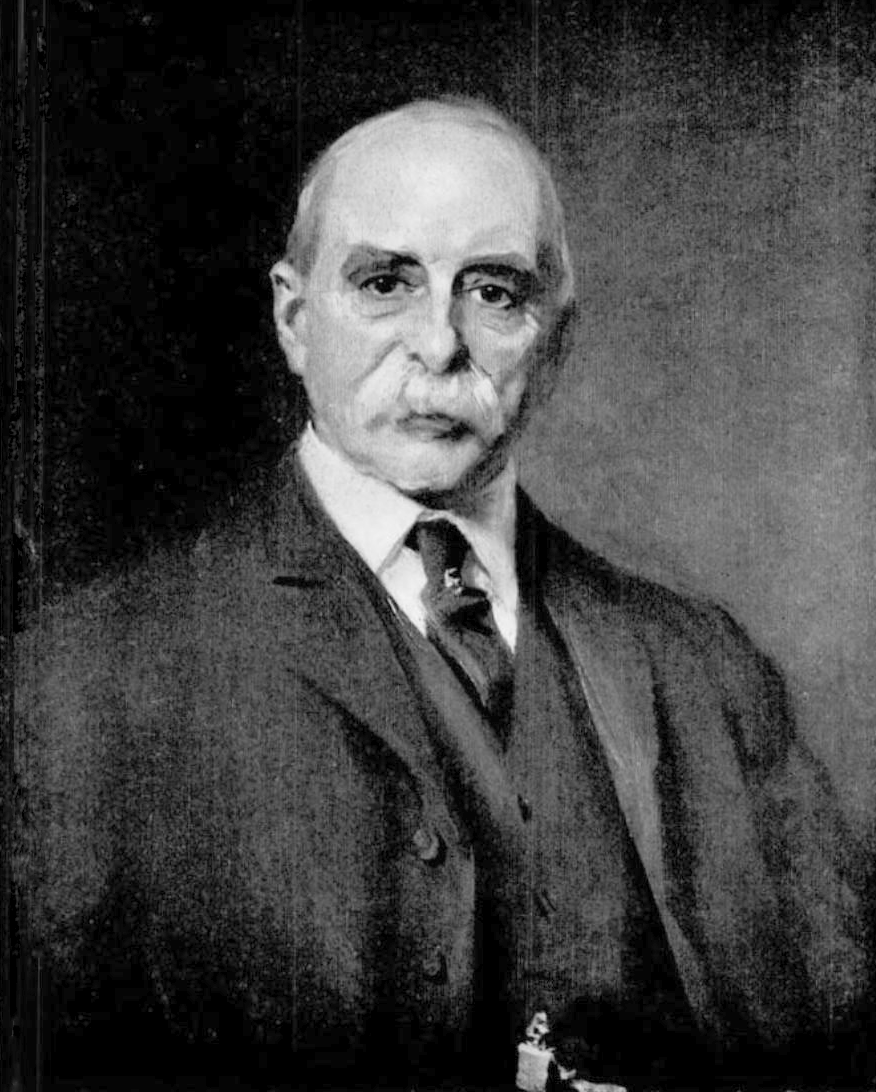
- Born: June 3, 1838; Utica, New York
- Died: July 8, 1918 (aged 80); New York, New York
- Education: Harvard University; Columbia Law School
- Occupation: Lawyer
- Political party: Republican

Edmund Wetmore (June 3, 1838 - July 8, 1918) was an attorney in New York City who served as president of both the New York City Bar Association and the American Bar Association.

== Biography ==
Edmund Wetmore was born in Utica, New York on June 3, 1838. A graduate of Harvard University and Columbia Law School, he began his legal career at the law firm of Gardiner Spring and William C. Russell in 1864 and eventually became an expert in equity law. Wetmore was descended from an old American family, and was president of the New York chapter of Sons of the Revolution from 1904 to 1914, and president of the General Society of the Sons of the Revolution from 1911 to 1915. He also served as an overseer of Harvard, and as president of the Harvard Alumni Association. He was active in the Republican Party for much of his life and served as president of the New York Republican Club. Wetmore was also a cofounder of the University Club of New York, a vice president from 1901 to 1905, and a president from 1905 to 1910.

He died at his home on East 57th Street on July 8, 1918.
