= Charles Cotesworth Beaman =

American lawyer

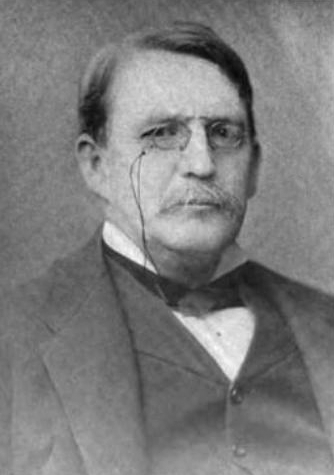
- Born: May 7, 1840; Houlton, Maine
- Died: December 15, 1900 (aged 60); New York, New York
- Education: Harvard University; Harvard Law School
- Occupation: Lawyer

Charles Cotesworth Beaman Sr. (May 7, 1840 – December 15, 1900) was an American lawyer who wrote The National and Private Alabama Claims and their Final and Amicable Settlement (1871). In December 1870 he served as the first-ever Solicitor General of the United States, a position created to compile the individual claims of losses caused by Confederate raider ships during the United States Civil War.

== Biography ==
Charles Cotesworth Beaman was born in Houlton, Maine on May 7, 1840.

He graduated from Harvard University and Harvard Law School. He began practicing law in New York City in 1867.

Beaman was also a vice president of the University Club of New York from 1890 to 1899 and a president from 1899 to 1900.

He died at his home in New York on December 15, 1900.
