= CSS Lark =

History
- Name: Lark
- Namesake: Lark
- Owner: Confederate States of America
- Builder: Laird Brothers, Birkenhead, England
- Launched: Nov 1864
- Fate: Scrapped, 1896

General characteristics
- Class & type: Lark-class paddle steamer
- Tonnage: 390 GRT
- Length: 210 ft 8 in (64.2 m)
- Beam: 23 ft 2 in (7.1 m)
- Draught: 6 ft (1.8 m)
- Installed power: 150 ihp (110 kW)
- Propulsion: side wheels, 2 oscillating steam engines; 2 boilers
- Speed: 12 knots (22 km/h; 14 mph)

The Lark was a paddle steamer employed by the Confederate States of America during the American Civil War. She was the last blockade runner to successfully escape from a Southern port before the Union blockade completely closed off this vital source of supplies.

Lark was designed and built by John Laird & Sons. The ship made four successful round trips through the blockade between Galveston, Texas, and Havana, Cuba. In April 1865, she ran aground near the entrance to Galveston harbor. Two launches dispatched from the Union blockading squadron attacked the Lark, which managed to fend off the assault with help from Confederate ground forces. On May 24, she dashed into Galveston again and managed to slip through the blockade back out to open sea, the last Confederate blockade runner to do so.
