= Ephraim Douglass Adams =

American educator

Ephraim Douglass Adams (December 18, 1865 in Decorah, Iowa – September 1, 1930 in Stanford, California) was an American educator and historian, regarded as an expert on the American Civil War and British-American relations.

Born in Iowa in 1865, he graduated from the University of Michigan in 1887, earning a Ph.D. in 1890. In the same year he was appointed special agent in charge of street railways for the 11th (1890 U.S. Census). His earlier work was done at the University of Kansas, where he became assistant professor (1891) and associate professor (1894) of history and sociology, and in 1899 professor of European history. In 1902, he was made associate professor of history in Leland Stanford Junior University, and in 1906, full professor of history at Stanford University. His work is widely cited. He is best known for The Power of Ideals in American History (1913).

== Bibliography ==
- The Control of the Purse in the United States Government (1894)
- The Influence of Grenville on Pitt's Foreign Policy, 1787-1798 (1904)
- British Interests and Activities in Texas, 1838-1846 (Albert Shaw Lectures, Johns Hopkins University, 1910)
- Lord Ashburton and the Treaty of Washington (1912)
- The Power of Ideals in American History (1913)
- Great Britain and the American Civil War, 2 volumes (1925)
