= William H. Van Benschoten =

American lawyer and lay leader (1872–1928)

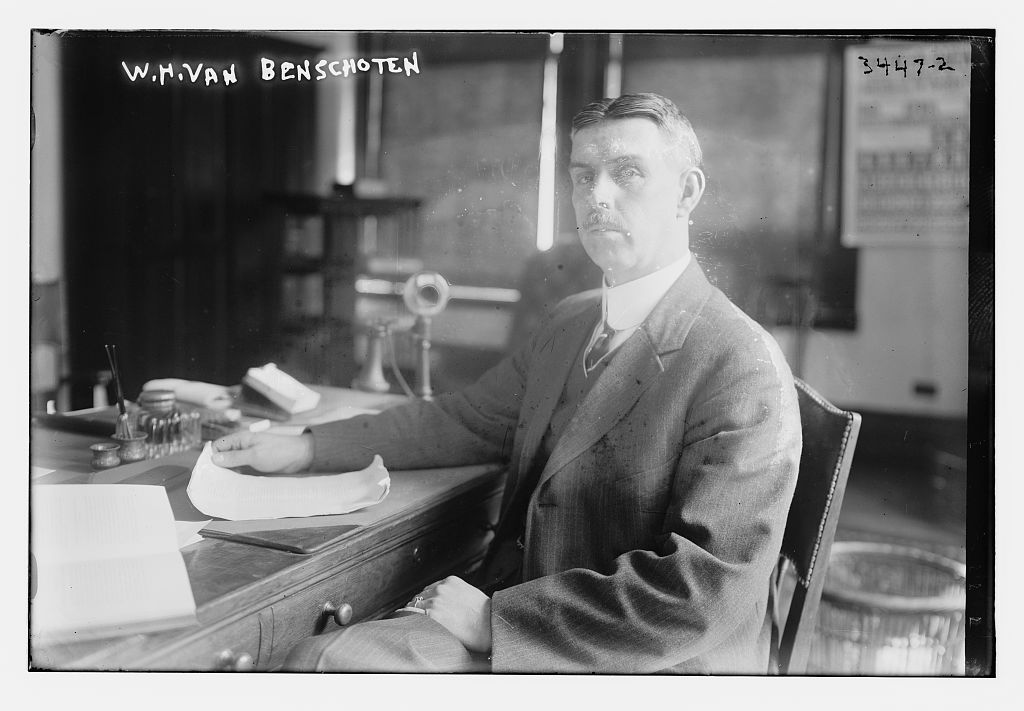
- Van Benschoten, c. 1910–1915
- Born: William Henry Van Benschoten; January 15, 1872; Addison, New York, U.S.
- Died: August 11, 1928 (aged 56); Thousand Island Park, New York, U.S.
- Burial place: Kensico Cemetery
- Education: Syracuse University (AB, AM); Albany Law School (LLB)
- Political party: Republican
- Spouse: Harriet E. Paddock (m. 1898)
- Children: 2

Signature
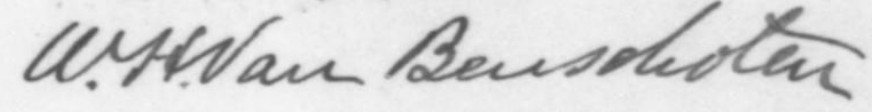

William Henry Van Benschoten (January 15, 1872 – August 11, 1928) was an American lawyer and lay leader in the Methodist Episcopal Church. Van Benschoten served as co-counsel with Bowers & Sands for former president Theodore Roosevelt in the 1910s during his two prominent successful libel suits. As a civic leader, he chaired a commission that recommended modernizing the freight transportation system of New York City.

== Life and career ==
Van Benschoten was born in Addison, New York, the third child and only son of Henry R. and Mary Ann (née Northrop) Van Benschoten. Belonging to old Dutch stock, Henry was a Methodist Episcopalian pastor active in upstate New York for fifty years. Mary was educated at the Methodist Genesee Wesleyan Seminary, which would become Syracuse University, and in middle age was a temperance activist.

Henry retired from the ministry and settled in Newark, New York. From there, William entered Syracuse University, studying liberal arts. He edited the yearbook and was a member of Beta Theta Pi (1894). Van Benschoten was also actively involved in YMCA organization, serving as a delegate at its 1893 Saratoga conference. Van Benschoten graduated AB from Syracuse University in 1894 and the following year graduated LLB at Albany Law School. He returned to get a Master of Arts from Syracuse in 1897 and would later serve as the University's trustee.

Van Benschoten was a record clerk at New York's constitutional convention of 1894 and then chief clerk at the office of the state's Attorney General. He was admitted to the bar of New York state in 1896. On October 1, 1897, Van Benschoten moved into private practice, working at New York City's Bowers & Sands (of John M. Bowers and B. Aymar Sands). He became a partner at the firm in 1910 and remained there until 1917.

=== Theodore Roosevelt libel suits ===
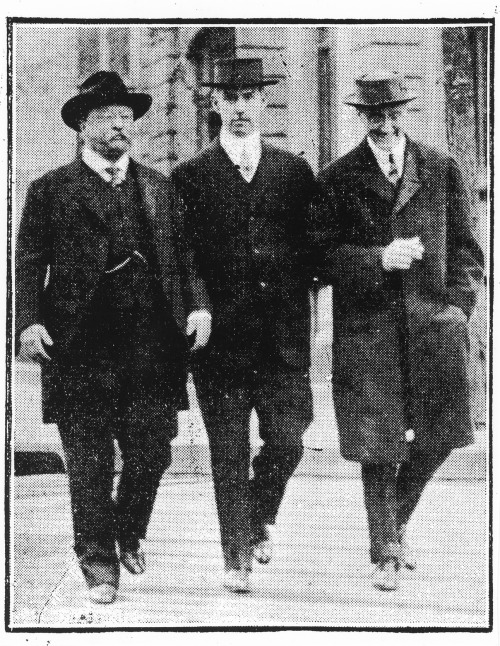
Van Benschoten (center) in 1915, with his client, Theodore Roosevelt (left) and his cousin, a witness and future president, Franklin D. Roosevelt (right). The Barnes–Roosevelt trial was widely followed and is considered by some to be a trial of the century.

Van Benschoten represented his "close friend", former president and then Progressive politician Theodore Roosevelt, in his two libel actions. In 1913, Van Benschoten "assisted memorably" Roosevelt's main attorney, James H. Pound, in the case against Republican newspaper editor George A. Newett. Newett wrote in the Ishpeming, Michigan Iron Ore during the 1912 presidential election that Roosevelt was a drunk. Newett could not prove his claims, retracted and apologized.

Two years later, Van Benschoten was co-counsel with Bowers in Roosevelt's case against William Barnes Jr., publisher of the Albany Times Union and conservative Republican party boss. Barnes was suing Roosevelt for $50,000 (equivalent to $1,591,283 in 2025) after he alleged in 1914 that Barnes and Albany County's Democrat boss, Charles Francis Murphy, were "of exactly the same moral and political type" and "will always be found fighting on the same side openly or covertly". The trial, held at Syracuse, was treated by both parties as political theatre, and Roosevelt hoped by winning to kill Barnes's political ambitions.

Though a Republican, Van Benschoten passionately defended Roosevelt, citing his popular record as president. Van Benschoten's opening speech characterized the trial as one between "a corrupt government" and "political liberty and freedom". He said: "The plaintiff stands above all things else for political power, machines and bosses. The defendant stands for the rights of the citizens, the welfare of the people and honest, decent government." Van Benschoten then turned to criticizing the "rottenness" and political criminality under Democratic state rule.

Van Benschoten's address was "widely praised" and got included in a 1925 book called Famous American Jury Speeches. Eventually, counsel successfully showed that Barnes was corrupt and did collude with Murphy — before New York Times Co. v. Sullivan, a successful libel defense had to prove the allegations were not libelous but true. The jury unanimously acquitted Roosevelt and awarded him trial costs of $1,442.52 (equivalent to $45,273 in 2025). Barnes promptly lost all influence in the Republican Party, whose leaders began a rapprochement with Roosevelt.

=== Later career ===
In 1917, Sands died and Van Benschoten entered into the reformed Bowers & Gerard with James W. Gerard, the former U.S. Ambassador to Germany. In 1918, Bowers and Gerard were joined by New York Supreme Court justice Frank N. Scott. A Newark newspaper called Scott, Gerard and Bowers "one of the best known law firms in New York City" and Van Benschoten "regarded as one of the rising young attorneys of that city." Later that year, however, Van Benschoten left for Duer, Whitehead & Strong, where he remained until his death.

=== Modernizing New York City transportation ===
In the early twentieth century, the bulk of passenger and freight between New York City and New Jersey traveled by water. This was inefficient and unreliable, subject to weather and labor unrest. Further, metropolitan freight infrastructure was outdated and inadequate. Since 1906, both state governments had established commissions to examine the issue.

In June 1917, New York Governor Charles S. Whitman appointed Van Benschoten to chair a Commission to Investigate the Surface Railroad Commission in the City of New York on the West Side tasked with "ending grade and steam operation on metropolitan streets and modernizing the terminal facilities of the trunk line railroads entering the City of New York." A severe fuel shortage during the winter of 1917–18 further highlighted the problem with relying on waterbound transportation.

The Commission's report of January 1918 blamed "politics, prejudice, personalities, indifference, and incapacity" for stranding coal across the Hudson River in railyards or on the shore of New Jersey:

Having held its closing sessions during the gravest fuel crisis in the history of the city, when millions of people were literally in the death-grip of freezing weather and thousands of tons of coal were ice-bound within sight across the river, the commission had brought home to it in a striking manner the necessity of finding speedy and final relief for the people of the City of New York from dependence upon a system of antiquated terminals and archaic cross-river transportation, under which three-fourths of their freight, including nearly all of their fuel and an essential portion of their food, must be carried by slow and uncertain floats across the Hudson River.

The Commission recommended building at least one railway tunnel under the Hudson, as well as a subway or elevated freight terminal, to be managed by a new Terminal Improvement Commission. The latter measure was blocked by civil servants belonging to New York and New Jersey's existing transport commissions. Additionally, the report's suggestion that a railway terminal would not be the most profitable use of prime land actually hurt the argument for rail transport in central Manhattan. However, its forcible characterizations contributed to the public discourse. The Holland Tunnel, for vehicular transportation between the states, began construction in 1920. The West Side Elevated Line, to end street-level transportation on the West Side, began construction in 1924.

== Religious work ==
Following his parents, Van Benschoten was an active Methodist. He was trustee and legal counsel to the New York City Society of the Methodist Episcopal Church and reportedly thought of himself as "Counselor of the Kingdom of God". He supported Methodist activities and societies and attended the 1920 and 1924 general conferences and the 1921 Ecumenical Methodist Conference at Westminster. He was also President of the Board of Trustees at St. Paul's Methodist Church and President of the New York Methodist Social Union, among other posts.

Van Benschoten strongly supported prohibition enforcement. His address at the 1921 Conference also shows he traveled the battlefields of Belgium and France after World War I and favored general arms control.

Outside of Manhattan, Van Benschoten remained trustee at his then-Methodist alma mater, Syracuse University, as well as Drew Theological Seminary in Madison, New Jersey, now Drew University.

== Personal life ==
On September 21, 1898, Van Benschoten married Harriet E. Paddock of Albany, daughter of Charlotte H. and Major William H. Paddock, a prominent newspaper proprietor. Harriet supported Methodist missionary work and at her death in 1935 was helping manage an elderly care home. The couple had two children:

- Katharine Van Benschoten Cairns Shumway (January 8, 1900 – 1974), wife of George W. Cairns (m. 1926 – his death 1947) and Lowell Shumway (m. 1957)
- William Henry Van Benschoten Jr. (b. August 9, 1901)

Van Benschoten was a member of the Holland Society of New York from 1906 as well as Chicago's Columbia Yacht Club. He also belonged to lawyers' and Republican clubs. The family finally lived at 285 Riverside Drive in the Upper West Side.

In 1928, Van Benschoten sought treatment for kidney problems from a doctor in Thousand Island Park. He died at his summer home there at 11:30 a.m. on August 11, aged 58. His death was reported in The New York Times, where he was cited as a "well-known lawyer" and a "prominent Methodist Episcopal layman." Funeral services were held on August 14 at St. Paul's Methodist Church. He was buried at Kensico Cemetery in Valhalla.
