= Robert Kelley Weeks =

American poet

Robert Kelley Weeks (September 21, 1840 – April 13, 1876) was an American poet.

Weeks, eldest son of Edward C. and Emily (Stephens) Weeks, was born in New York City, September 21, 1840. He graduated from Yale College in 1862. After graduating he became a member of the Columbia Law School, where, at the conclusion of the course, in May, 1864, he received the degree of LL.B. In the same month he was admitted to the Bar of New York. His tastes led in the direction of literature, and turning from the practice of law, he devoted himself to reading and study. In 1866 a small volume appeared, entitled, Poems, by Robert K. Weeks, and in 1870 a volume entitled, Episodes and Lyric Pieces, both published by Leypoldt & Holt. A third volume of poems was in press at the time of his death. He also prepared for publication a book of Extracts from English literature, and made occasional poetical and critical contributions to the periodicals of the day. His work was anthologized by Edmund Clarence Stedman in An American Anthology, 1787–1900.

He died at Harlem, unmarried, of consumption, on April 13, 1876, in the 36th year of his age.
