= Mannion v. Coors Brewing Co. =

Copyright case in the US

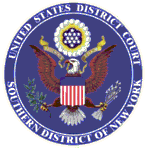
- Court: United States District Court for the Southern District of New York
- Full case name: Jonathan Mannion v. Coors Brewing Co. and Carol H. Williams Advertising
- Decided: July 21, 2005
- Citation: 377 F.Supp.2d 444

Case history
- Subsequent actions: Plaintiff's motion for reconsideration of damages denied, 530 F.Supp.2d 543 (2008)

Court membership
- Judge sitting: Lewis A. Kaplan

Case opinions
- Photograph of professional basketball player was sufficiently original in its expression to be copyrightable; but whether allegedly infringing image was substantially similar was a question of fact. Summary judgement denied

Keywords
- copyrightability; photography

Mannion v. Coors Brewing Co. (377 F.Supp.2d 444) is a 2005 copyright case decided by the United States District Court for the Southern District of New York. It concerns the issue of copyrightability in photography. Jonathan Mannion, the plaintiff, sued the brewer and its advertising agency, Carol H. Williams Advertising (CHWA), alleging they had too closely copied an image he took of basketball star Kevin Garnett.

Mannion had photographed Garnett wearing athletic clothing and jewelry for a magazine article. CHWA, after having licensed Mannion's image for possible use on a billboard, decided to shoot a very similar image for its ads. Mannion registered his image with the U.S. Copyright Office and sued Coors and CHWA after seeing one of the billboards several months later. Coors argued in its defense that Mannion was claiming copyright on the idea of a photo of a Black man dressed that way and there was nothing original and protectable in it. Nor were the two images substantially similar since the man in the Coors ad was turned in a different direction and the image was in black and white rather than color. Both parties moved for summary judgement.

Judge Lewis A. Kaplan's decision denied Mannion's motion since he found the substantial similarity question to be one of fact that should be tried. (A jury ultimately found for Mannion.) But he held also that Mannion's image was indeed original enough to be copyrighted. Finding existing case law wanting on what constituted originality in photography, he established three criteria—rendition, timing and composition—for determining the originality, and thus the copyrightability, of photographs. He also criticized the applicability of the idea-expression dichotomy and its merger doctrine to visual art, including photography. Scholars have in turn expressed concern about some of the implications of the case, while praising it as "the most extensive judicial discussion of photographic copyright in recent years". It has been cited by other courts deciding whether photographs at issue are eligible for copyright protection, including in cases filed against Rihanna and Beyoncé.

== Underlying dispute ==
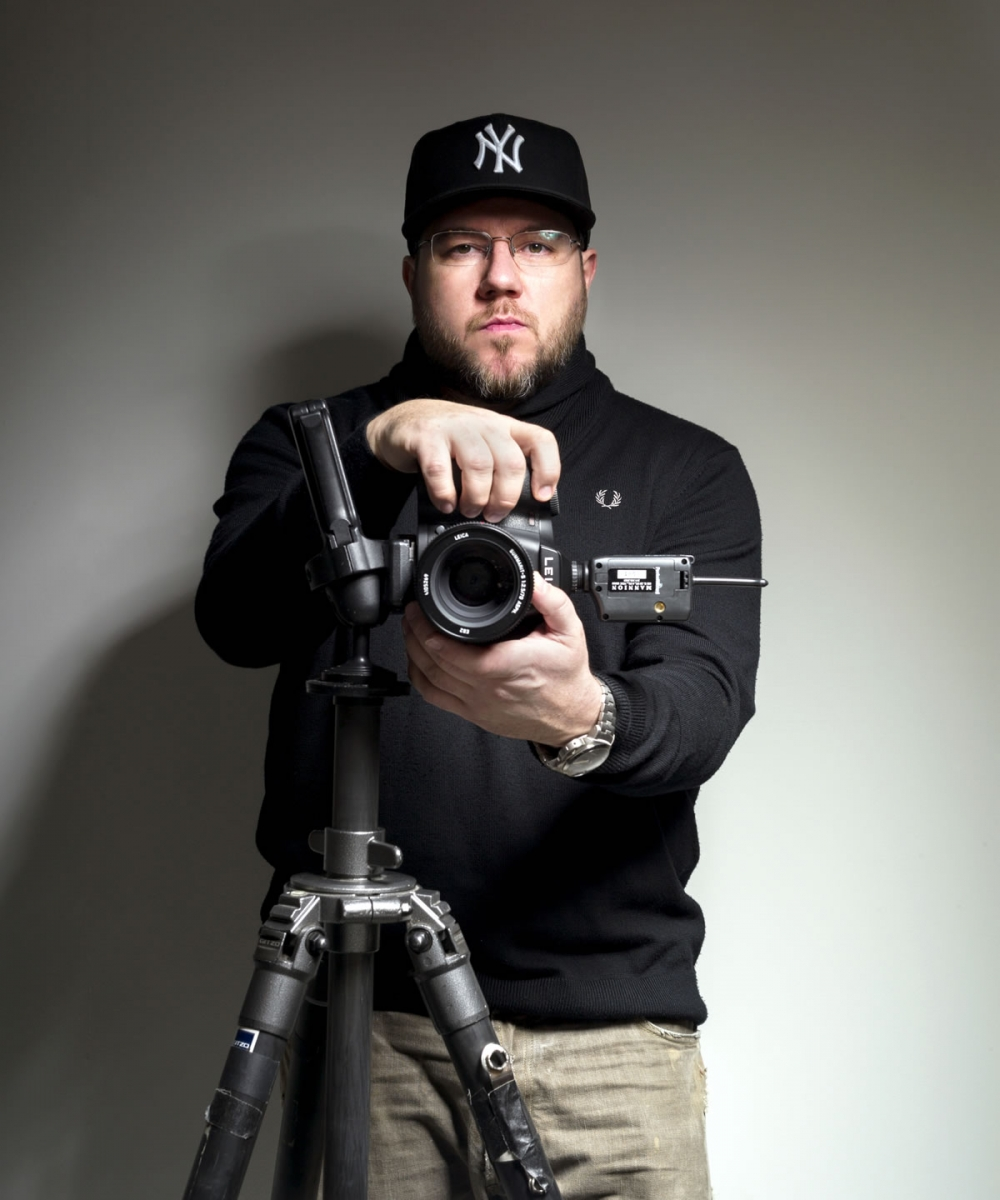
Jonathan Mannion, in 2015

In 1999 Slam, a magazine that covers basketball from a perspective shaped by hip hop culture, commissioned photographer Jonathan Mannion to take pictures of Kevin Garnett, then a young star with the Minnesota Timberwolves, for a story the magazine was running on him. Mannion, whose earlier images of Garnett had met with the player's approval, went to Garnett's home. Garnett said he would do anything Mannion wanted. "I want you to wear all the jewelry you have in this moment of over-opulence and go crazy", he responded.

Garnett went to his wardrobe and came back wearing a white T-shirt and pants with a black baseball cap. He had, as suggested, put on a wide array of jewelry, including several necklaces, bracelets on both wrists, earrings, rings on one finger of each hand, all of gold or platinum with diamond settings. On his right wrist he had a Rolex watch. Mannion shot him with his head cocked, his eyes looking to the right and his hands on his abdomen with the thumbs hooked in his waistband. He was lit from the left, the camera looking upwards at him from below, with a cloudy background through which some blue sky was visible.

"[A] storm was coming in and I remember that being the moment", Mannion recalled to Slam in 2013. "There are a handful of pictures that exist like that in my career, and that's one of them." The story ran in the magazine's December 1999 issue, with the photograph rotated at a 90-degree angle counterclockwise and most of Garnett's left arm cropped out in order to fit onto a two-page spread. It had the headline "Above the Clouds".

In 2001, the Coors Brewing Company tasked the Carol H. Williams Advertising (CHWA) agency with developing a new campaign to increase consumption of its Coors Light brand among young Black men in urban areas. Among the ideas CHWA considered was something based on Mannion's photo of Garnett. One of its "comp boards", mockups for outdoor advertising such as billboards proposed for the campaign, included the part of Mannion's image that showed Garnett's torso, without his head, and on the other side a can of Coors Light, with the phrase "Iced Out" (referencing both the diamonds in the jewelry and the actual ice on the beer can) in between on a background with clouds and sky. Mannion had licensed this use to CHWA. Later they contacted him, among other photographers, to see if they would be interested in producing an image for the campaign. Mannion submitted a bid but heard nothing in response.

Unbeknownst to Mannion, CHWA and Coors decided to use an image very similar to his picture of Garnett. After he saw it on a billboard while driving around Los Angeles, he pulled over, took a picture of the billboard and asked his studio to send him his original so he could compare them, believing they had used his image without permission. It was not, but "[t]hey copied it so identically down to the placement of the watch and it wasn't KG's Rolex, it was a Folex with a different color band or whatever."

Mannion submitted his image to the Copyright Office for formal registration in 2003. Early the following year he filed suit against Coors and CHWA in the United States District Court for the Southern District of New York alleging copyright infringement and seeking damages. After submitting evidence to Judge Lewis A. Kaplan, the parties both moved for summary judgement in their favor, arguing there were no disputed issues of fact to be decided.

== Decision ==
Mannion's photo of Garnett as it originally appeared (left), and the Coors "comp board", similar to the final billboard used

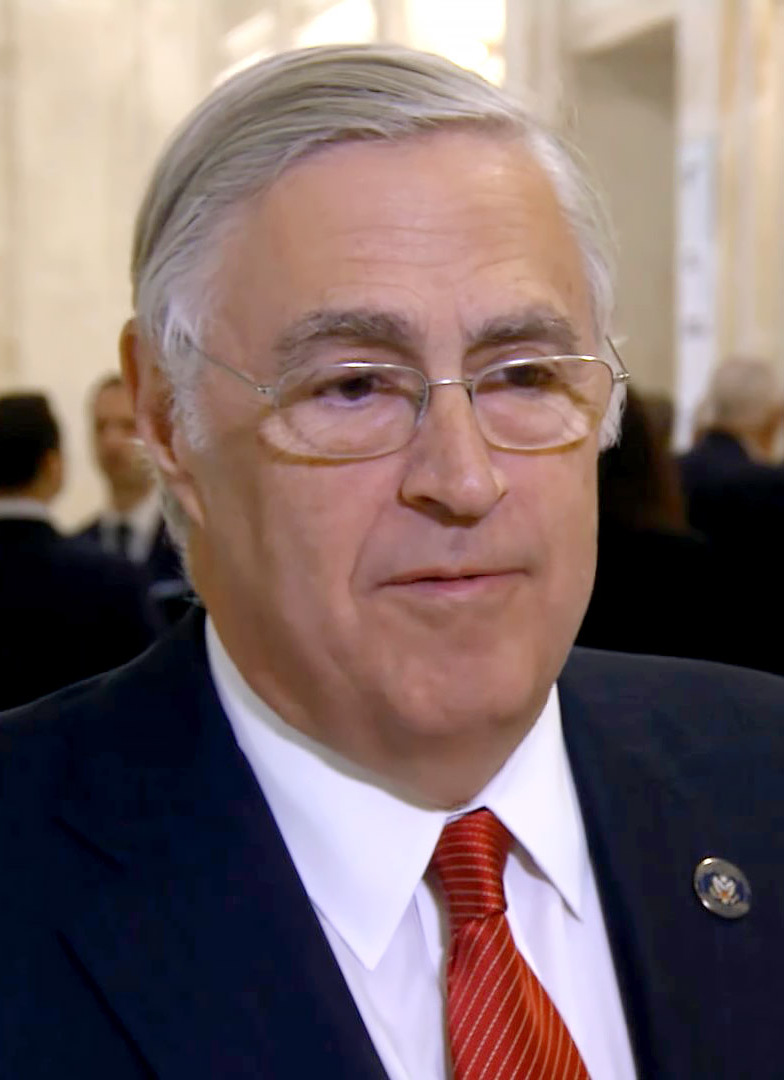
Judge Kaplan, in 2014

After summarizing the facts of the case, Kaplan turned to the underlying law. Coors conceded that Mannion's copyright on the image was valid, and Kaplan said it would be reasonable for a trier of fact to conclude that since Coors had actual access to the image, actual copying occurred. The question then was whether the two images were substantially similar.

To determine that, Kaplan asked what aspects of the original could be considered original to it and protectible under Mannion's copyright. He began with an observation from Nimmer on Copyright, a frequently cited legal treatise, that copyright in photography cannot cover the subject matter of the photograph. "But this is not always true", Kaplan wrote:

It of course is correct that the photographer of a building or tree or other pre-existing object has no right to prevent others from photographing the same thing. That is because originality depends upon independent creation, and the photographer did not create that object. By contrast, if a photographer arranges or otherwise creates the subject that his camera captures, he may have the right to prevent others from producing works that depict that subject.

In Burrow-Giles Lithographic Co. v. Sarony, the 1884 case where the Supreme Court had upheld Congress's grant of copyright protection to photography, Kaplan noted that it held that most photographs could claim some protectible originality. Later courts' efforts to more specifically define what constituted that originality "are somewhat unsatisfactory", he observed, (Note: Kaplan elaborated on this in a footnote. Burrow-Giles had suggested the overall composition of the posed photograph of Oscar Wilde at issue was protectable; the many later cases to attempt such an enumeration he cited focused on more specific aspects such as the camera angle, lighting, and choices made prior to taking the photograph such as the choice of film, lens and camera. "Even these lists are not complete", Kaplan wrote. "They omit such features as the amount of the image in focus, its graininess, and the level of contrast.") for two reasons.

First, Kaplan said, "the nature and extent of a photograph's protection differs depending on what makes that photograph original." Second, they inadvertently elevated the photographer's technical choices in making the image to originality sufficient to confer copyright. "Decisions about film, camera, and lens, for example, often bear on whether an image is original", Kaplan observed. (Note: In SHL Imaging v. Artisan House, several years earlier, another Southern District judge, William H. Pauley III, had gone into greater detail about this: "The technical aspects of photography imbue the medium with almost limitless creative potential. For instance, the selection of a camera format governs the film size and ultimately the clarity of the negative. Lenses affect the perspective. Film can produce an array of visual effects. Selection of a fast shutter speed freezes motion while a slow speed blurs it. Filters alter color, brightness, focus and reflection. Even the strength of the developing solution can alter the grain of the negative.") "But the fact that a photographer made such choices does not alone make the image original." This was not just an observation; it contravened the Supreme Court's more recent decision in Feist Publications, Inc., v. Rural Telephone Service Co. rejecting the "sweat of the brow" doctrine. "Protection derives from the features of the work itself, not the effort that goes into it." Kaplan also recalled the decision he had handed down several years before in Bridgeman Art Library v. Corel Corp., where he had rejected the plaintiff's claim that American copyright law protected its photographs of classic artworks themselves in the public domain since the immense effort that went into making them look exactly like the originals meant Bridgeman's photos were "slavish copies" that similarly could not claim copyright protection for lack of originality.

=== Originality in photography ===
"The Court therefore will examine more closely the nature of originality in a photograph", Kaplan announced. He wrote that he found useful The Modern Law of Copyright, a treatise on English copyright law by Hugh Laddie, a High Court judge in the UK, since despite differences in other areas of copyright law the two jurisdictions had similar conceptions of originality. "A photograph may be original in three respects", Kaplan concluded. "They are not exclusive."

The first Kaplan called rendition: the combined effect of the camera, its settings such as exposure and aperture, lens, films, lighting and developing techniques used, as well as the angle and framing, on the image. "To the extent a photograph is original in this way," the judge concluded, "copyright protects not what is depicted, but rather how it is depicted." He cited SHL Imaging v. Artisan House, Inc., a 2000 case decided by the Southern District in which it held that the unlicensed reuse of images of mirror-clad picture frames the defendant manufacturer had commissioned from the plaintiff photographer was infringing. The manufacturer had argued that the photographer could claim no independent copyright in images entirely of products it had designed, but Judge William H. Pauley III rejected it, pointing to the effect of the photographer's technique on the images. "What made the photographs original," in that case, Kaplan commented, "was not the lens and filter selection themselves. It was the effect produced by the lens and filters selected, among other things." He distinguished them from the photographs in Bridgeman, where "the goal was to reproduce exactly other works. The photographs were entirely unoriginal in the rendition, an extremely unusual circumstance. Unless a photograph replicates another work with total or near-total fidelity, it will be at least somewhat original in the rendition."

Secondly, Kaplan found that a photographer's timing may give rise to originality in a photograph. The legal precedent was an early 20th-century case, Pagano v. Charles Beseler Inc., again from the Southern District, in which the copyright of a photograph of a street scene in front of the New York Public Library was challenged. The court, finding for the photographer, observed that "It undoubtedly requires originality to determine just when to take the photograph, so as to bring out the proper setting for both animate and inanimate objects.... The photographer caught the men and women in not merely lifelike, but artistic, positions, and this is especially true of the traffic policeman."

Kaplan looked outside reported case law for examples modern readers would be more familiar with: first, Alfred Eisenstadt's V-J Day in Times Square, and wildlife photographer Thomas D. Mangelsen's widely reprinted Catch of the Day, showing a grizzly bear waiting with an open mouth for a salmon leaping out of an Alaskan river. Timing necessarily applied only to the image, and not its subject matter:

... the copyright in Catch of the Day does not protect against subsequent photographs of bears feasting on salmon in the same location. Furthermore, if another photographer were sufficiently skilled and fortunate to capture a salmon at the precise moment that it appeared to enter a hungry bear's mouth—and others have tried, with varying degrees of success—that photographer, even if inspired by Mangelsen, would not necessarily have infringed his work because Mangelsen's copyright does not extend to the natural world he captured.

The third aspect, creation of the subject, was an exception to the general rule that photographers cannot claim copyright over the subject matter, Kaplan wrote. This applied to images such as posed portraits and still lifes where the photographer created the scene and had a large degree of control over what appeared in the image and where. Kaplan looked at Gross v. Seligman and Rogers v. Koons, two cases decided decades apart by the Second Circuit Court of Appeals, which has appellate jurisdiction over the Southern District.

In Gross, decided in 1914, the court had held that a photographer who took a second version of an earlier photo he had taken of a young woman for a client (who thus owned the copyright) where the woman was posed the same way, except smiling and holding a cherry stem between her teeth, infringed the copyright on the earlier work. Almost 80 years later, in Rogers, the court ruled that a Jeff Koons sculpture infringed the photograph it had been based on since despite the change of medium and dimension the record showed that Koons had wanted it to meticulously replicate the original image. In that case, the court had noted some of the other aspects of originality Kaplan had already identified were present, "[but] its originality in the creation of the subject was more salient".

"To conclude," Kaplan continued, "the nature and extent of protection conferred by the copyright in a photograph will vary depending on the nature of its originality." In all the images he had discussed under rendition and timing, copyright did not cover the subject of the image. "By contrast, to the extent that a photograph is original in the creation of the subject, copyright extends also to that subject. Thus, an artist who arranges and then photographs a scene often will have the right to prevent others from duplicating that scene in a photograph or other medium."

=== Originality of Mannion's photograph of Garnett ===
Moving to the photograph at issue in the instant case, "There can be no serious dispute that the Garnett Photograph is an original work", Kaplan wrote. "[It] does not result from slavishly copying another work and therefore is original in the rendition. Mannion's relatively unusual angle and distinctive lighting strengthen that aspect of the photograph's originality. His composition—posing man against sky—evidences originality in the creation of the subject." The judge allowed there were limits, as Mannion had not created Garnett's likeness and could not claim copyright in it, nor for the same reason the sky.

Coors had overreached in arguing against copyrightability based on this, however, said Kaplan. The defense had pointed to Garnett having chosen the clothing and jewelry he wore rather than Mannion. But Kaplan found that argument failed in two ways. First, even if Garnett had chosen what he wore, that was only one element of the overall image, and that led to the second problem: that the originality of the overall image was at issue, not simply how Garnett was dressed. Kaplan emphasized this by quoting a reductio ad absurdum observation from a previous Second Circuit copyright case: "[I]f we took this argument to its logical conclusion, we might have to decide that 'there can be no originality in a painting because all colors of paint have been used somewhere in the past.'"

=== Idea/expression distinction ===
Coors had also argued that Mannion was claiming copyright on "the generalized idea and concept of a young African American man wearing a white T-shirt and a large amount of jewelry", when under law only the expression of an idea can be copyrighted. Alternatively, they cited the merger doctrine, arguing that Mannion's idea and its expression were so closely intertwined that granting copyright on the latter would effectively grant copyright on the former. Kaplan allowed that the idea had some legal validity but called Coors's reliance on it "misplaced":

The "idea" (if one wants to call it that) postulated by the defendants does not even come close to accounting for all the similarities between the two works, which extend at least to angle, pose, background, composition, and lighting. It is possible to imagine any number of depictions of a black man wearing a white T-shirt and "bling bling" that look nothing like either of the photographs at issue here.

For Kaplan, that alone sufficed to dispose of Coors's argument on this issue. "But the argument reveals an analytical difficulty in the case law about which more ought to be said." He began with Kaplan v. Stock Market Photo Agency, Inc., a 2001 Southern District decision that Coors had based its argument on. In that case the court found enough difference between two images showing the same idea, a view looking down the face of a tall building from the perspective of a businessman standing on a ledge, his shoes prominent in the foreground, to hold against infringement of the plaintiff's copyright. "But what is the "idea" of Kaplan's photograph?", the judge asked. He posited several possibilities, one of which, had Judge Allen G. Schwartz held them to be the "idea" of the plaintiff's photograph, might have led to a different result.

In two decisions of the Second Circuit, rendered 30 years apart, Judge Learned Hand had acknowledged the issue of distinguishing the idea from the expression in a work, Kaplan observed. "Nobody has ever been able to fix that boundary, and nobody ever can", Hand wrote in Nichols v. Universal Pictures Corp., a 1930 case which established that fictional characters, when sufficiently developed, can be copyrighted. In 1960's Peter Pan Fabrics v. Martin Weiner Corp. holding that patterns on print fabrics are eligible for copyright, Hand reiterated the point: "Obviously, no principle can be stated as to when an imitator has gone beyond copying the 'idea,' and has borrowed its 'expression.' Decisions must therefore inevitably be ad hoc."

But according to Kaplan, this understated the problem. Where to draw a line, as Hand acknowledged, is a common question in many areas of the law. Beyond that, the problem was "not simply that it is not always clear where to draw the line; it is that the line itself is meaningless because the conceptual categories it purports to delineate are ill-suited to the subject matter." That, to Kaplan, was a function of the idea-expression distinction having arisen from cases over literary works where the difference between the two can more readily be ascertained:

... [I]t makes sense to speak of the idea conveyed by a literary work and to distinguish it from its expression. To take a clear example, two different authors each can describe, with very different words, the theory of special relativity. The words will be protected as expression. The theory is a set of unprotected ideas ... [But i]n the visual arts, the distinction breaks down. For one thing, it is impossible in most cases to speak of the particular "idea" captured, embodied, or conveyed by a work of art because every observer will have a different interpretation. Furthermore, it is not clear that there is any real distinction between the idea in a work of art and its expression. An artist's idea, among other things, is to depict a particular subject in a particular way. As a demonstration, a number of cases from this Circuit have observed that a photographer's "conception" of his subject is copyrightable. By "conception," the courts must mean originality in the rendition, timing, and creation of the subject—for that is what copyright protects in photography. But the word "conception" is a cousin of "concept," and both are akin to "idea." In other words, those elements of a photograph, or indeed, any work of visual art protected by copyright, could just as easily be labeled "idea" as "expression.

This critique was not unique to him, Kaplan wrote. Hand had expressed it in Peter Pan Fabrics, noting that "In the case of designs, which are addressed to the aesthetic sensibilities of an observer, the test is, if possible, even more intangible." Second Circuit Judge Jon O. Newman, had, when holding for the panel in Warner Bros. Inc. v. American Broadcasting Companies, Inc. that the title character of The Greatest American Hero television series did not infringe the studio's copyright on live-action depictions of Superman, observed that some of the tensions between the roles of similarities and differences in deciding whether infringement has occurred come from legal tests derived from literary works being used for other media. He had then observed that "[a] story has a linear dimension: it begins, continues, and ends. If a defendant copies substantial portions of a plaintiff's sequence of events, he does not escape infringement by adding original episodes somewhere along the line. A graphic or three-dimensional work is created to be perceived as an entirety." In a later law review article, Newman clarified that he had been saying "one cannot divide a visual work into neat layers of abstraction in precisely the same manner one could with a text."

Other circuits had taken note of the issue, Kaplan observed. In 1978's Franklin Mint Corp. v. National Wildlife Art Exchange, a case involving a claim similar to Mannion's where a painting was alleged to be so similar to a prior work as to be infringing, Judge Joseph F. Weis Jr. of the Third Circuit had found it:

Troublesome, too, is the fact that the same general principles are applied in claims involving plays, novels, sculpture, maps, directories of information, musical compositions, as well as artistic paintings. Isolating the idea from the expression and determining the extent of copying required for unlawful appropriation necessarily depend to some degree on whether the subject matter is words or symbols written on paper, or paint brushed onto canvas. (Note: Weis elaborated on these issues: "Moreover, in the world of fine art, the ease with which a copyright may be delineated may depend on the artist's style. A painter like Monet when dwelling upon impressions created by light on the facade of the Rouen Cathedral is apt to create a work which can make infringement attempts difficult. On the other hand, an artist who produces a rendition with photograph-like clarity and accuracy may be hard pressed to prove unlawful copying by another who uses the same subject matter and the same technique.")

"For all of these reasons," Kaplan concluded, "I think little is gained by attempting to distinguish an unprotectible 'idea' from its protectible 'expression' in a photograph or other work of visual art." He next considered what courts had found to be the "idea" in works of visual art. In Rogers, the court had found the idea to be "a couple with eight small puppies seated on a bench." But Kaplan said it "just as easily could be 'people with dogs on their laps,' 'the bliss of owning puppies,' or even a sheepishly ironic thought such as 'Ha ha! This might look cute now, but boy are these puppies going to be a lot of work!'" The Rogers's court's language, he said, was instead "a description of the subject at a level of generality sufficient to avoid implicating copyright protection for an original photograph."

For Kaplan, this led to the central quandary of the idea-expression divide in visual art:

[A]t what point do the similarities between two photographs become sufficiently general that there will be no infringement even though actual copying has occurred? But this question is precisely the same, although phrased in the opposite way, as one that must be addressed in all infringement cases, namely whether two works are substantially similar with respect to their protected elements. It is nonsensical to speak of one photograph being substantially similar to another in the rendition and creation of the subject but somehow not infringing because of a shared idea. Conversely, if the two photographs are not substantially similar in the rendition and creation of the subject, the distinction between idea and expression will be irrelevant because there can be no infringement. The idea/expression distinction in photography, and probably the other visual arts, thus achieves nothing beyond what other, clearer copyright principles already accomplish.

He concluded that it was "not useful or relevant" for photography at least.

=== Substantial similarity ===
Kaplan next turned to the question of whether an observer could reasonably find the two images substantially similar, which would constitute infringement. The usual test is "whether an 'ordinary observer, unless he set out to detect the disparities, would be disposed to overlook them, and regard [the] aesthetic appeal as the same.'" The Second Circuit had also established a decade earlier a "more discerning observer" test for work, usually visual, that combined copyrighted and uncopyrightable elements, But citing concerns expressed in intervening circuit cases about the foundation of that test, concerns that seemed to Kaplan to undermine it, he concluded that both tests would, in the instant case, reach the same result, since the unprotectible elements the images had in common—Garnett's clothing and jewelry, and the background—were not "copyrightable in and of themselves, but their existence and arrangement in this photograph indisputably contribute to its originality ... The question is whether the aesthetic appeal of the two images is the same."

The similarity of the subject's pose, background and dress suggested to Kaplan that "the defendants .. appear to have recreated much of the subject that Mannion had created and then, through imitation of angle and lighting, rendered it in a similar way." While those were protected elements based on Kaplan's earlier analysis, he also had to take into account the differences, which he characterized as changes rather than additions: color in the original and black and white in the other, the angle at which the subject was posed, the absence of a head in the Coors image, and the jewelry and clothing not being exactly the same between the two. Those had to be considered as well.

"The parties have catalogued at length and in depth the similarities and differences between these works", Kaplan wrote. "In the last analysis, a reasonable jury could find substantial similarity either present or absent." He looked back to a 1987 Southern District case in which a photographer had also sued an advertising agency over a similar image to his, likewise created for a beverage ad. There, the court had concluded that the balance between similarities and differences was close enough that the ultimate finding of a trier of fact could not be reasonably anticipated by the court, denying plaintiff's motion for summary judgement. "[It] presents facts as close to this case as can be imagined, [and so] the images are such that infringement cannot be ruled out—or in—as a matter of law."

Kaplan granted only a small part of Coors's motion, a request for relief from Mannion's request for violation of his right to make derivative works. Mannion's motion was denied in its entirety.

== Disposition ==
The case was turned over to a jury to decide, which found that Coors had infringed Mannion's copyright and awarded him $30,000 in damages from Coors and $20,000 from CHWA. Mannion believed that those amounts were based on an undercalculation of the revenue Coors had earned from the use of the infringing image in its ad and moved for judgement as a matter of law instead, or a retrial of the damages issue. He argued that since Coors's plan was to use the billboard as part of its marketing strategy toward young urban black men, and copies of the billboard had been shipped to 18 cities as part of that effort, he was entitled to a portion of Coors's $803 million gross profit on Coors Light for 2002 equal to the percentage of the Black population in those cities. That came to 0.574 percent of the total American population, which Mannion argued worked out to $4.6 million. Kaplan denied the motion, holding that Mannion had not proved that later increases in Coors's profits were solely due to the increased sales of Coors Light. and that there was little evidence to suggest that the billboards played any significant role in that increase.

== Subsequent jurisprudence ==
In 2009, the Seventh Circuit became the first appellate circuit to accept the Mannion standards in Schrock v. Learning Curve International, Inc., a case involving the reuse of a photo rather than its recreation. There, the plaintiff photographer sued the licensed maker of Thomas & Friends toy sets after it continued to use photos of the toys it had commissioned from him following the end of his employment. Looking to both Mannion and Bridgman, Judge Diane Sykes, writing for a unanimous panel, held that:

... they do not fall into the narrow category of photographs that can be classified as "slavish copies," lacking any independently created expression. To be sure, the photographs are accurate depictions of the three-dimensional "Thomas & Friends" toys, but Schrock's artistic and technical choices combine to create a two-dimensional image that is subtly but nonetheless sufficiently his own.

In 2013 the First Circuit found Mannion "instructive" in helping it resolve Harney v. Sony Pictures Television. The plaintiff photographer alleged that a scene in a television movie about Christian Gerhartsreiter imitated too closely an image he took of Gerhartsreiter, then living under the alias of Clark Rockefeller, in a Boston park with his young daughter on his shoulders. When Gerhartsreiter abducted the girl a few days later, the FBI distributed Harney's image nationally in order to help find Gerhartsreiter, resulting in the scene and the photo being replicated in the TV movie.

Sony's motion for summary judgement had been granted by the district judge. Harney had argued on appeal that, like Mannion, the similarities and differences between the two images were complex enough to require that a jury be allowed to decide the substantial similarity question. Judge Kermit Lipez, writing for a unanimous panel, found the two cases "notably distinguishable" by the fact that Mannion had worked with his subject to create the scene and create what Kaplan found to be protectable originality, while Harney had simply happened upon Gerhartsreiter and his daughter and could not claim to have created his subject.

Back in the Southern District, Judge Shira Scheindlin also adopted Kaplan's standards of photographic originality in a 2011 finding that David LaChappelle's suit alleging infringement of his photos by Rihanna's video for "S&M", where he had like Mannion been involved at the early planning stages, should also be decided by a jury. She noted the decisions Mannion had taken in creating his subject. "Because LaChapelle alleges he made comparable decisions in creating and rendering the Photographs," she wrote, "he successfully alleges that they contain protectible elements."

Five years later, Mannion helped another Southern District judge, Jed Rakoff, reach a contrary decision in another case involving a filmmaker claiming a pop star unlawfully appropriated their work in a video. Matthew Fulks claimed Beyoncé's Lemonade film, made to accompany that album, borrowed extensively from his short film Palinoia without acknowledgement. In one of nine examples Fulks argued were copied from his film, he noted that both it and Lemonade depicted the subject from their left. While finding that too broad and general to warrant protection by itself, Rakoff noted that Kaplan had, in Mannion, held the upward, right-facing view of Garnett to be original enough to be copyrightable in that image. "But here," Rakoff wrote, distinguishing the cases, "plaintiff fails to allege that there is anything unusual about 'facing' subjects to the 'left' or shooting scenes 'from the left.'"

That same year Judge Richard J. Sullivan heard another case where a photographer alleged a defendant's video was infringing. Janine Gordon claimed Ryan McGinley's "Levi's America" infringed some of her photos. Finding it hard to begin with to understand how a 1,700-frame video could infringe a still image of Gordon's, Sullivan wrote that her extensive reliance on Mannion's holding that a photographer can copyright a subject they have created or orchestrated was misguided. "But the protected 'conception' is not the idea of an interracial kiss, but the artist's 'originality in the rendition, timing, and creation of the subject — for that is what copyright protects in photography.'" Gordon could claim neither of the latter two as her own, and the use of video made the rendition issue moot. "Thus, Plaintiff's appeal to Mannion simply underscores the substantial dissimilarity between the images at issue."

In 2020's Cruz v. Cox Media Group the defendant company tried to use Mannion to argue that the plaintiff photographer's image of Sayfullo Saipov being taken into custody on the streets of Lower Manhattan following the 2017 New York City truck attack lacked sufficient originality to be protectible. "This argument misses the mark", wrote Southern District Judge Nicholas Garaufis, in denying Cox's summary judgement motion. "As with almost any photograph, the Photograph reflects creative choices, including Cruz's timing for when he took the Photograph."

=== Bill Diodato Photography LLC v. Kate Spade LLC ===
Other courts have found Kaplan's observations about the difficulty of applying the idea-expression divide helpful in reaching decisions in similar cases involving infringement claims related to photography. Before 2005 was out, Denny Chin, another Southern District judge, (Note: Later elevated to the Second Circuit) had to decide Bill Diodato Photography LLC v. Kate Spade LLC, which involved similar facts. There, the plaintiff photographer had sent to the defendant fashion house, unsolicited, his photograph of the lower portions of a woman's legs, her feet in fashionable high-heeled sandals, seen from outside a stall door in a public restroom, with her panties around her legs and a handbag on the floor next to her feet, as part of a portfolio to see if Spade was interested in working with him. After some initial interest, Spade informed Diodato's agent that it preferred to work with higher-profile photographers.

Diodato sued Spade after its images for its marketing campaign a few months later included one also showing a woman's heeled feet with her panties above next to her handbag, taken from outside a closed bathroom stall door. He argued against Spade's motion for summary judgement, citing the mix of similar and dissimilar elements that had been given to the jury to resolve in Mannion, but Chin distinguished the two cases, pointing to the many similar photographs Spade submitted into evidence predating either that were before the court, an issue not present in Mannion, one that made it clear that only Diodato's expression of a familiar idea could be protected:

Here, in contrast, the creation of the subject was not original to Diodato. The BDP Photograph was certainly rendered in an original way — the technical aspects of the photograph were Diodato's own — but the scene depicted in the BDP Photograph is a concept that has appeared often in popular culture. The elements that are arguably copied in the Kate Spade Photograph are non-original, unprotectible elements.

== Analysis and commentary ==
Legal scholars have praised Mannion for its willingness to tackle a difficult issue. Copyright law expert Rebecca Tushnet called it "the most extensive judicial discussion of photographic copyright in recent years". St. John's law professor Eva Subotnick noted that Kaplan's move in favor of establishing originality within the four corners of an image highlights the absence of guidance as to the substantive content of originality from either Congress or the Supreme Court." Terry Kogan of Utah describes it as "among the most insightful in case law". In 2011 another analysis noted how often it has been cited. Ten years later, that frequency of citations was described as being taken by other courts as "generally indicative of photography's copyrightability".

Tushnet, nevertheless, found Kaplan's formulation problematic, particularly his point that in visual art the idea/expression divide often breaks down and becomes one and the same. "This analysis would seem to defeat copyright protection for photographs, since ideas are excluded by statute and policy from the subject matter of copyright," she wrote in the Harvard Law Review. The same could be said of poetry, she notes. Tushnet dismisses Kaplan's use of a hypothetical treatise on the theory of special relativity to distinguish this problem as unique to visual art by herself distinguishing the treatise as "a classic factual work" rather than an artistic one. She notes that this creates a contradiction at the heart of the case: "Moreover, if the idea of a photograph really is its expression and vice versa, then a different photograph should have a different idea, and yet Mannion's analysis is performed in the service of finding that the defendant's photograph might be similar enough to infringe the plaintiff's copyright." Ultimately, for Tushnet, Kaplan's criteria amount to distinguishing "the elements of a photograph that simply indicate that it is a photograph". But while there indeed might be, apart from those aspects, originality and protectability in a photograph, "courts have gone well beyond nondiscrimination and crossed the line into protecting that which would be readily recognized as unprotectable in a literary work."

Kogan finds Kaplan's dismissal of the idea-expression divide in photography incompatible with the Supreme Court's holding in Feist that it applies to all works of potentially original authorship. "The problem inherent in cases like [these] is not that the idea/expression dichotomy cannot be applied to photography." he writes.

Rather, it is that courts locate an image's idea in the wrong place. A photograph's idea is not to be found on its face. Rather, that idea exists in the mind of the photographer; it is the mental vision she hopes to capture in taking a picture. If she shares that vision with another photographer, the latter is free to try his hand at embodying that idea in a photograph with no fear of copyright infringement. However, once a photographer uses a camera to fix her mental vision in a tangible form, the resulting photograph is expression—entirely expression. There is no "idea" for a court to excise from the image. Accordingly, the idea/expression dichotomy can provide no justification for a court's chopping up a photograph into protected and unprotected pieces.

Kogan pointed to Wallace Computer Services, Inc. v. Adams Business Forms, Inc., as a case where that was avoided and thus decided correctly. There, the plaintiff alleged the cover photos of hands, pens and telephones the defendant used for its phone message books were extremely similar to those it had long used for its own similar products. The Northern District of Illinois refused to consider the individual elements, which the plaintiff argued were non-protectible, separately, observing that "There are countless different layouts which could have been used by the photographer of the defendant to make photos which look different from those of the plaintiff ... The creative minds in charge of the defendant's advertising and marketing certainly could have opted for a photo layout that did not so closely resemble that of its competitor." Kogan considers that an example of what he calls a tableau, equivalent to Kaplan's "creation of the subject".

=== Effect on merger doctrine ===
Kaplan's comments about the unworkability of the idea-expression divide has led to discussion of the merger doctrine, a defense to infringement under the idea/expression divide that can apply if there are only a limited number of ways a particular idea can be expressed, the idea and the expression are merged and thus neither can be protected. Kogan's analysis of Mannion and other photography copyright cases touching on this issue suggested to him that:

... there is never a justification for applying the merger doctrine to photography. If the idea of a photograph is located in the mind of the photographer and if its expression is located on the face of the resulting image, it is a logical impossibility for the two to merge. As such, the merger doctrine should not be applied to photography ... period.

Amanda Adian takes the opposite view. In a 2022 NYU Law Review article, she argues the merger doctrine is not only compatible with photography, it needs to be revitalized and used not just in tests for infringement but as a threshold inquiry for copyrightability. This, Adian argues, would recognize changes in technology that have created copyright trolls like Richard Liebowitz, by denying copyrightability to a great many images like the one before the court in Cruz, which in her opinion was too "ordinary" an idea to qualify for protection. "The conundrum that Judge Kaplan identified in Mannion", she writes, "that '[i]n the visual arts, the [idea/expression] distinction breaks down'—in fact counsels strongly in favor of merger's application in the context of photography as a near presumption, for it is this very inextricability of idea and expression that merger is designed to probe."

== See also ==
- List of copyright case law
- Andy Warhol Foundation for the Visual Arts, Inc. v. Goldsmith, 2023 U.S. Supreme Court case stemming from a photographer's discovery of unlicensed reuse of her work following limited early licensed use.
