= Station Squabble =

2020 digital photograph by Sam Rowley

- Station Squabble
- Artist: Sam Rowley
- Year: 2020
- Completion date: 2020
- Catalogue: Print for sale
- Medium: Digital photography
- Movement: Wildlife photography
- Subject: Two mice fighting on a London Underground platform
- Location: London Underground; 51.5085300°N 0.1257400°W
- Owner: Sam Rowley
- Website: sam-rowley.com

Station Squabble is a digital photograph taken by Sam Rowley that won the Natural History Museum's Wildlife Photographer of the Year People's Choice Award, described by the BBC as an "annual, internationally famous WPY competition", on 12 February 2020. Two mice, which had been foraging separately on a platform in the London Underground, are depicted fighting over a crumb that they had found simultaneously. To capture the shot, Rowley spent a week overnight in the Underground system, according to the BBC, receiving "many strange looks from commuters", Rowley said, as he had to lie on various station platforms with his camera. The "split-second face-off" received around 28,000 votes. The mice's squabble, Rowley later commented, was "over in seconds". The photograph was chosen from a shortlist of 25 out of 48,000 submitted images.

The Director of the Natural History Museum, described the picture as showing "a fascinating glimpse into how wildlife functions in a human-dominated environment." Rowley is a researcher with the BBC's photography unit. The New Straits Times described it as depicting "Jerry vs Jerry", referencing the cartoon character Jerry Mouse from Tom and Jerry.

== Equipment used ==
To create the digital image, Rowley used a Nikon D500 with a Sigma 105mm f/2.8 EX DG lens; 1/125 seconds at f2.8; ISO 1000.
