= Catch of the Day (disambiguation) =

Catch of the Day is a wildlife photograph by Thomas D. Mangelsen.

Catch of the Day may also refer to:

- "Catch of the Day" (Dexter's Laboratory), an episode of Dexter's Laboratory
- Catch of the Day, a work by cartoonist Jim Toomey
- Catch of the Day, an Australian online retailer, later acquired by Wesfarmers
- Operation Catch of the Day, a 2026 immigration raid by ICE in the US State of Maine
