= Mittermeier =

Mittermeier is a German surname. Notable people with the surname include:

- Cristina Mittermeier (born 1966), Mexican photographer
- Michael Mittermeier (born 1966), German comedian
- Russell A. Mittermeier (born 1949), American primatologist, herpetologist and biological anthropologist

== See also ==
- Mittermaier
