= Sam Rowley =

- Born: London, UK
- Education: University of Bristol, Zoology
- Occupation: Wildlife photographer
- Website: sam-rowley.co.uk

Sam Rowley is an English amateur photographer specialising in wildlife photography. Originally from London, he now lives in Bristol, UK where he works at the BBC Natural History Unit.

== Station Squabble ==
Rowley rose to instant fame when his digital photograph named Station Squabble won the 2019 Natural History Museum's Wildlife Photographer of the Year People's Choice Award. The Station Squabble image went viral on the Internet when the world's news organizations reported the occurrence.
