= Brooks Falls =

Waterfall in Katmai National Park, Alaska, US

Coordinates: 58.5550°N 155.7915°W

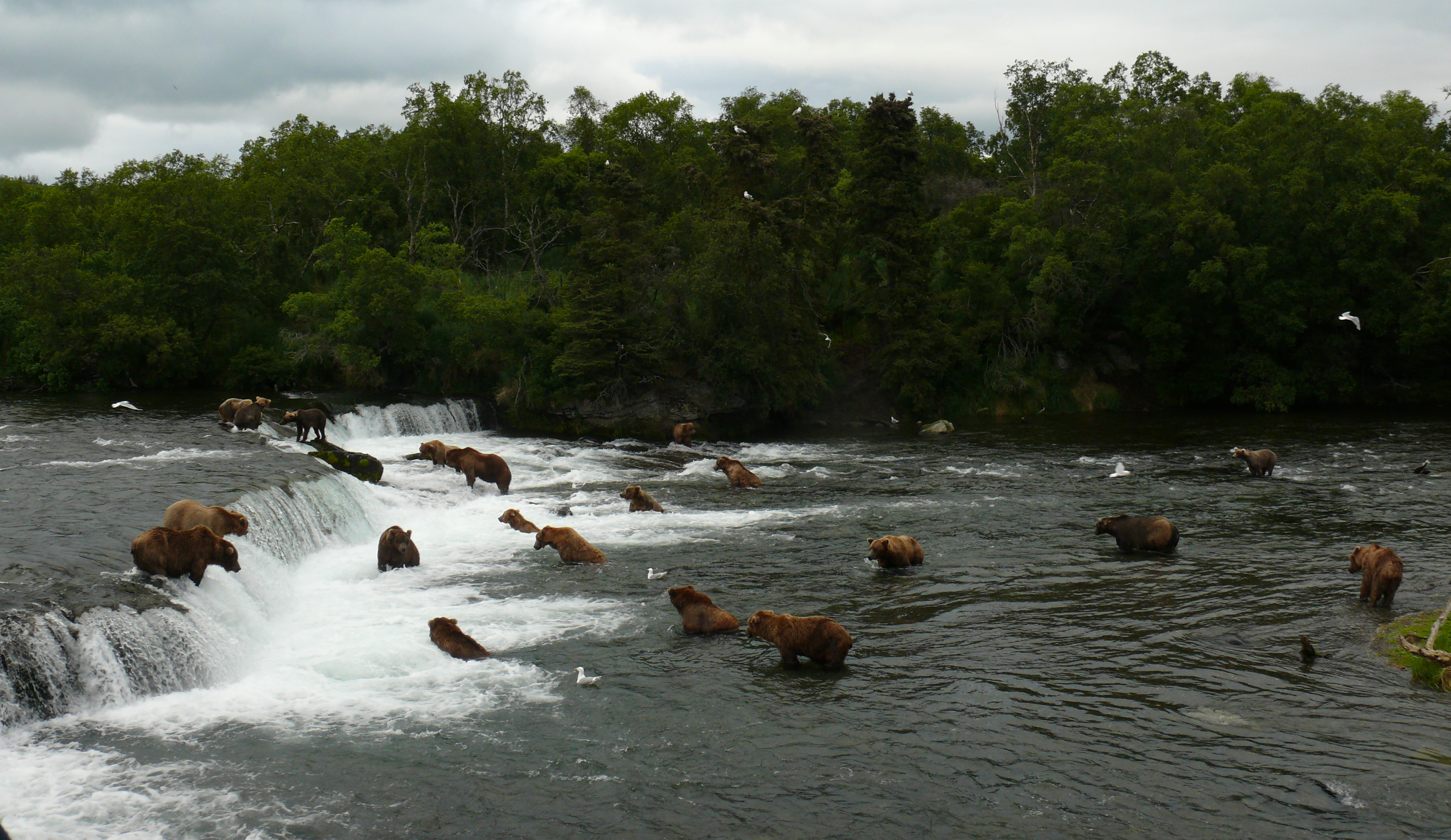
Group of bears at Brooks Falls.

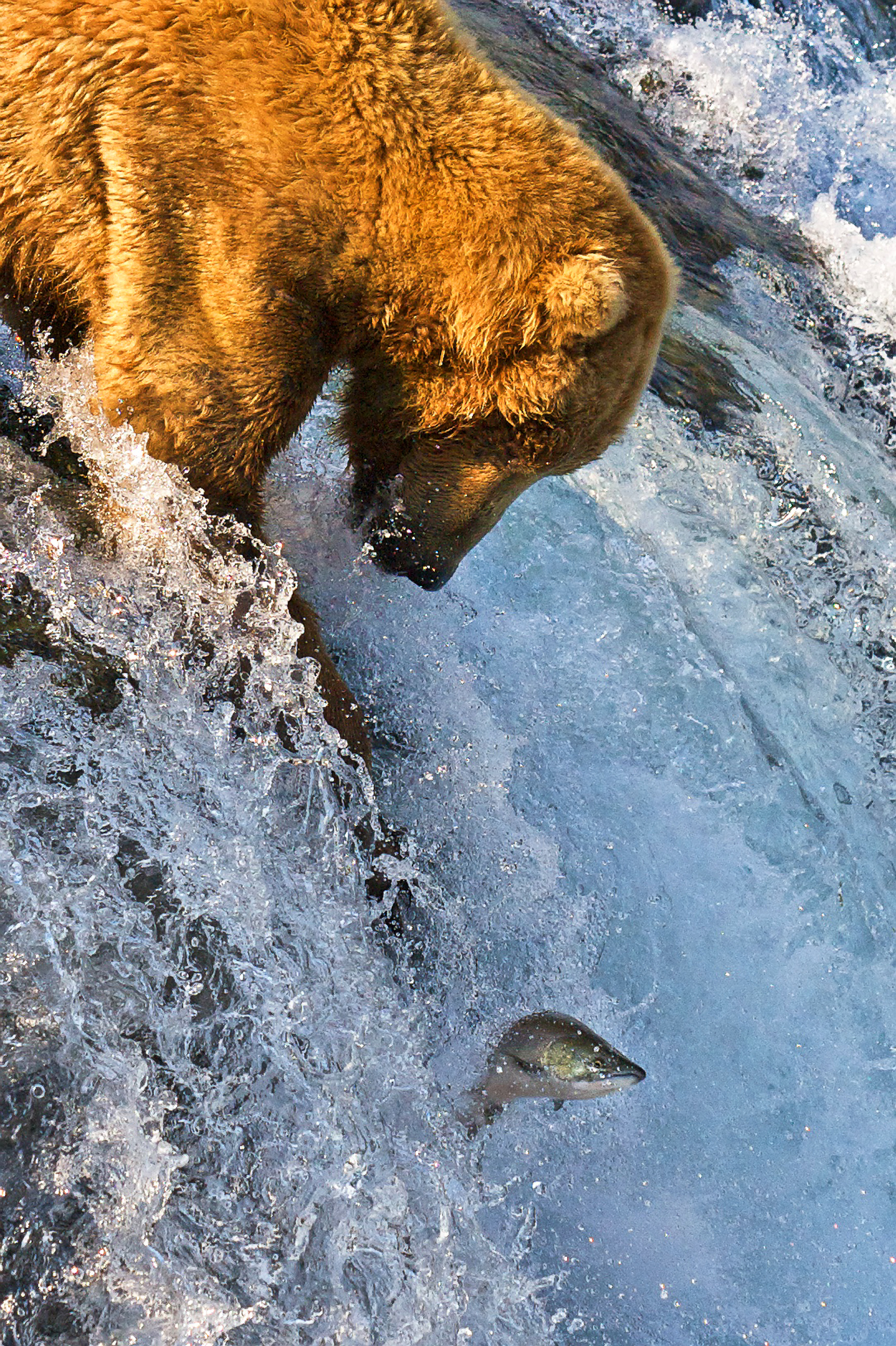
Fishing bear at Brooks Falls.

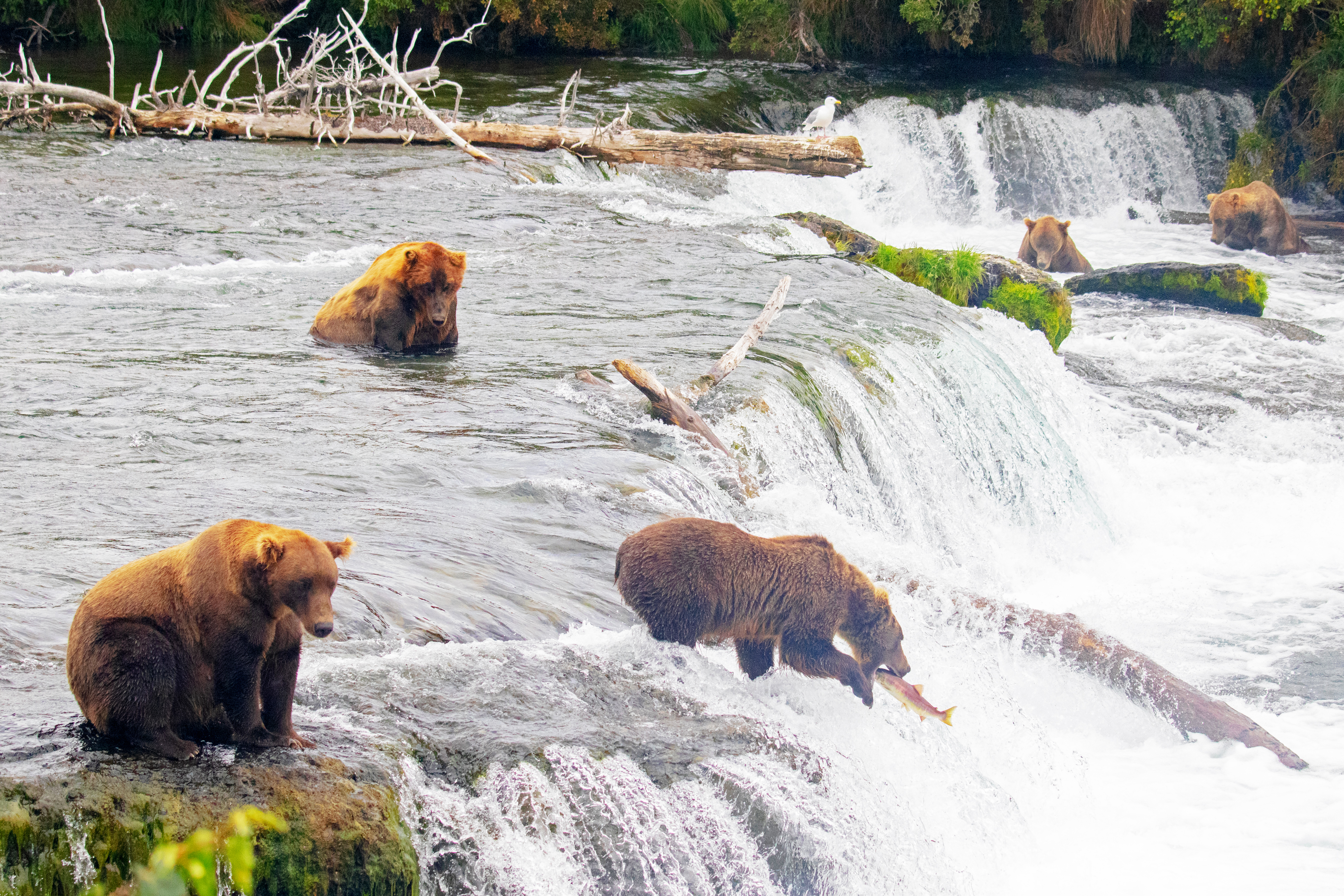
Bears at Brooks Falls feeding on sockeye salmon.

Brooks Falls is a waterfall located within Katmai National Park and Preserve in Alaska. Located on the Brooks River a mile and a half (2.4 km) from Brooks Lake and an equal distance from Naknek Lake, the falls are famous for watching salmon leap over the 6 foot (1.8 m) falls to get to their Brooks Lake spawning grounds. Consequently, large populations of brown bears are attracted to feed on the spawning salmon. Brown bears usually congregate at the falls in July through early September, and many well-known photos of bears have been taken there, particularly Thomas Mangelsen's Catch of the Day. July witnesses the greatest concentrations of bears of any month at the falls; up to 25 bears have been seen at one time at Brooks Falls in that month. In September, a smaller number of bears (maximum about 18 at one time) can be seen at the falls to feast on the later salmon runs.

== History ==
Before the 1950s, when Brooks Camp was opened, there were fewer bears at the falls than there are today, and no more than 6–7 bears could be observed at one time. Since hunting was allowed, bear numbers were lower and salmon and sport fishing was the primary attraction to the falls. Now, with hunting banned and viewing controlled, bear numbers have boomed to quadruple their former number.

The site's archaeological human remnants date back some 9,000 years, some of the oldest human remains in North America. Since the site is not far from the Bering Land Bridge, it is quite possible that some of the first humans from Russia made villages here. Native Americans still continue to harvest food caches and live their own ways of life at a site not far from the falls known as the Old Savonoski Site.

Despite all the old artifacts near the falls, most attention continues to focus on the bears and salmon; it is regular to find up to ten bears at the falls at one time. As many as 43 bears have been sighted at the falls in a single day.

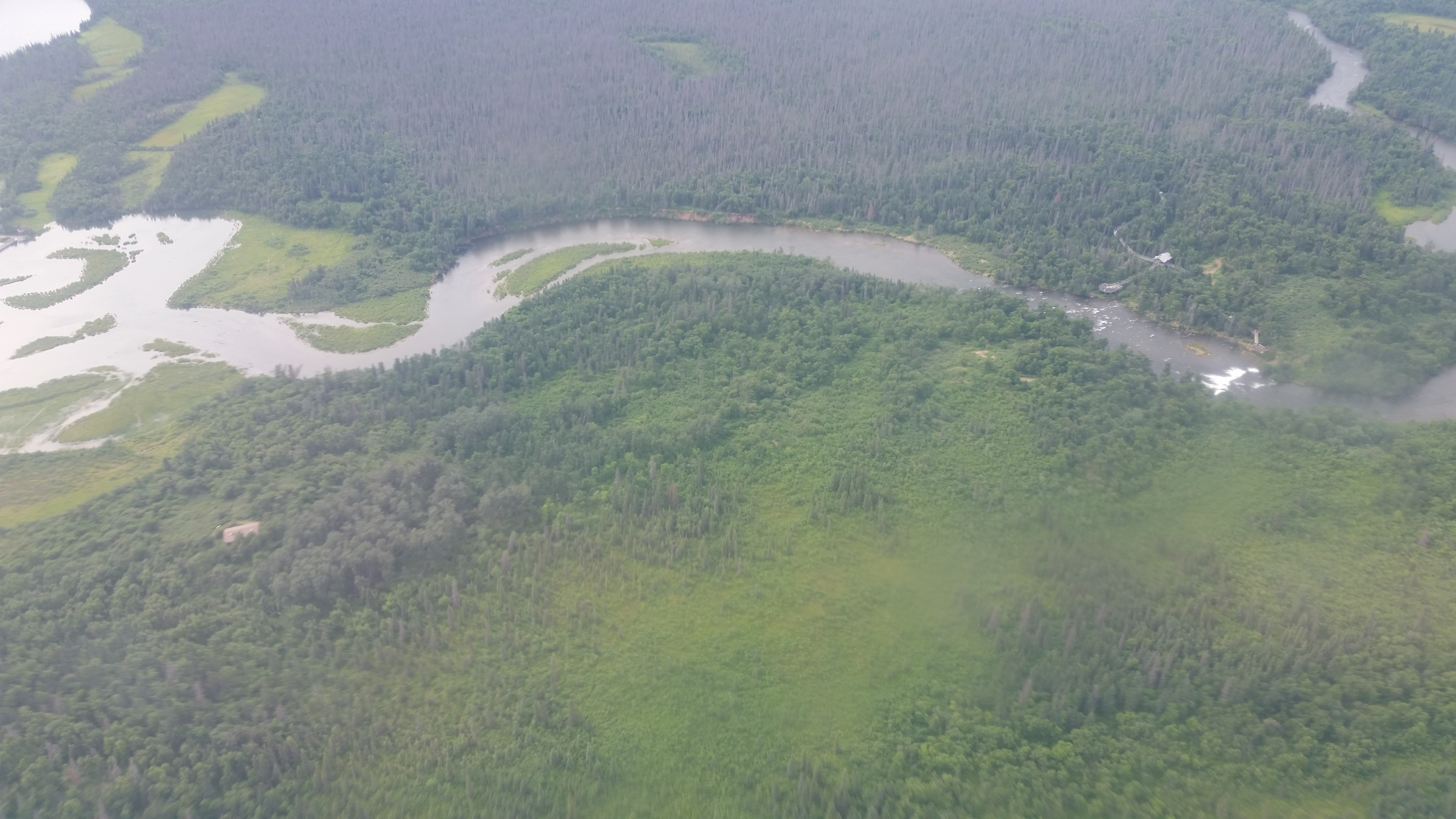
Brooks River and Falls with viewing platforms. Naknek Lake is to the left and Lake Brooks to the right.

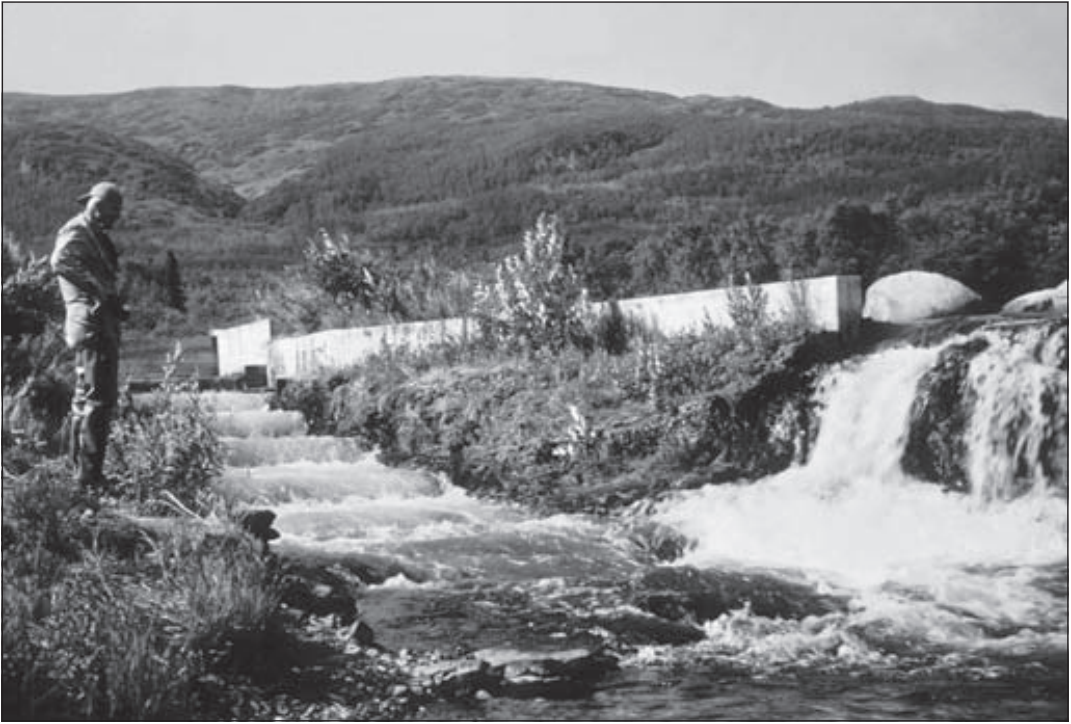
Brooks Falls Fish Ladder 1951

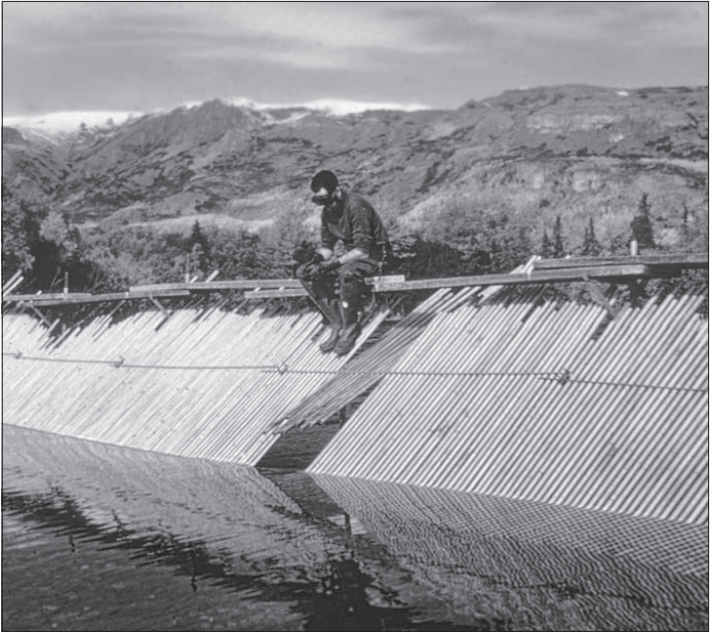
Counting salmon on the Brooks River Weir in 1958

== Fish ladder and weir ==
In 1921, Kidawik Creek was renamed Brooks River, and Toms Lake renamed Brooks Lake. A controversial "stream improvement" was implemented in 1920 by the United States Bureau of Fisheries, when they cut a 10 foot gap on the south bank of the river, which was widened to 15 feet the next year. Between 1948 and 1950, the bureau, by then reorganized into the United States Department of the Interior's Fish and Wildlife Service (later the United States Fish and Wildlife Service), built a fish ladder in the gap as part of its "landscape improvements." In 1974, the NPS closed the ladder and in 1986, placed sandbags to block salmon access. The Alaska Department of Fish and Game opposed a 1987 NPS proposal to dismantle the ladder, and the structure remains, though not used. Similarly, a seasonal weir for counting salmon was constructed in 1940 by the bureau, across the outlet of Brooks Lake at Brooks River. This was replaced by a permanent one in 1952. The bureau, renamed the National Marine Fisheries Service, transferred ownership of the weir to the NPS in 1978.

== See also ==
- List of waterfalls
- List of waterfalls in Alaska
- Upward Sun River site
