= Catch of the Day =

1988 photograph by Thomas D. Mangelsen

Coordinates: 58.5550°N 155.7916°W

Catch of the Day

Catch of the Day is a 1988 wildlife photograph by Thomas D. Mangelsen. Taken at Brooks Falls in Alaska's Katmai National Park and Preserve, it depicts a sockeye salmon leaping from the water into the mouth of an Alaskan brown bear, immediately before the bear eats the fish. It has been described as iconic and one of, if not the most, famous wildlife photographs ever taken.

Although viewers of the photograph have assumed that it was created through digital manipulation, Mangelsen took the image on film before the advent of digital photography. After taking many pictures of bears hunting salmon at the falls, he did not realize what he had captured until developing his film. Catch of the Day has been praised for its timing, and many other photographers at Brooks Falls have attempted to replicate it. In a widely cited case in which he discussed at length aspects of photographs that are original enough to merit copyright protection in the United States, federal judge Lewis A. Kaplan cited Catch of the Day as an example of "originality in the timing", copyrightable for that alone.

== History ==
Mangelsen had begun his photography career focusing on grizzly bears in Colorado and later the Greater Yellowstone Ecosystem (GYE) in neighboring Wyoming, where he made his home outside Yellowstone National Park. The bears, a threatened species, had by the 1980s become rare in the GYE, so Mangelsen began going north, to Canada and Alaska, where there was less hunting and tourism pressure and the animals were more common. He began photographing polar bears as well.

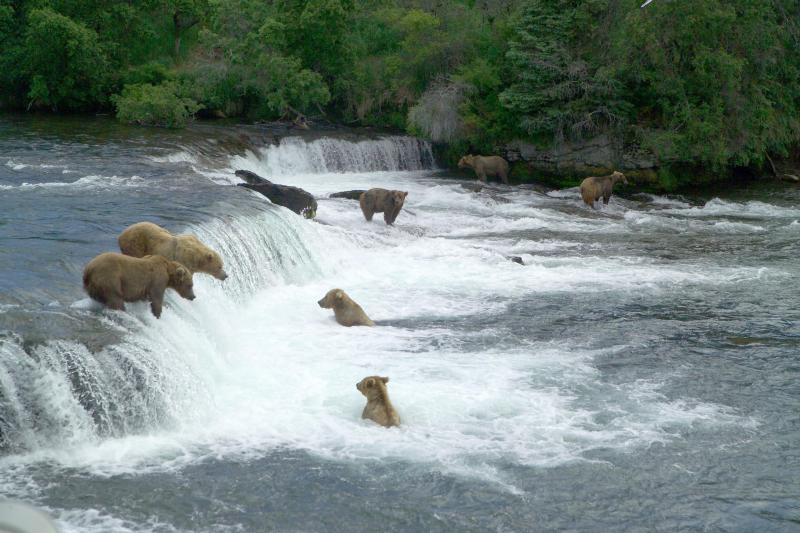
Bears hunting fish at Brooks Falls

One location that was particularly rewarding turned out to be the McNeil River in the Alaskan Peninsula, which supports one of the world's largest brown bear populations, due to the ample supply of sockeye salmon the bears feed on in the river. From there, Mangelsen also went to nearby Brooks Falls in Katmai National Park and Preserve, where bears have long been observed feeding on fish heading upstream to spawn. While some wildlife photographers will discreetly follow an animal they are trying to photograph to get the shot they want, Mangelsen prefers to wait, hoping to capture a shot he expects and plans for. "My biggest delight is putting myself into a position so that animals can reveal what they want me to see."

One week in 1988, Mangelsen camped out near Brooks Falls during salmon spawning season, when bears turn out in numbers to catch them. He set his camera up with a cable release, allowing him to remotely trigger the shutter, and pointed it in the direction of the falls, pressing the button every time he saw a fish jump out of the water. Mangelsen did not realize one of those images had captured a fish in the last moment before the bear's mouth closed on it until he began developing his film a month later.

== Reception ==
"It's such an extraordinary image", Anderson Cooper told Mangelsen when interviewing him for 60 Minutes in 2019. "In this day and age, people would think that this is Photoshopped, that—that you got a photo of a fish somewhere and, I mean, it's so perfect." Mangelsen reminded Cooper that Photoshop, the widely-used image editing software he had referenced, was not even on the market in 1988. Other 21st-century commentators have made the same observation as Cooper.

The timing of the image, at the last possible moment, has been cited as the reason for its appeal. "[T]his is the magic. This is the moment", Mangelsen told Cooper. "[A]nd this little tiny space right here I think is so important. Just that, you know, quarter of an inch ... One nanosecond later (chomp)." On his website, Mangelsen has emphasized that "[n]othing about Catch of the Day could have been rigorously choreographed by me. Rather, I had to put myself into position and wait, wait, wait, hoping, waiting more, and praying for magic to happen."

Since Brooks Falls is easily accessible and has a viewing platform on the same bank Mangelsen used, many of the photographers who have visited Katmai during the bears' hunting season since 1988 have tried to capture a similar image. These attempts led federal judge Lewis A. Kaplan of the United States District Court for the Southern District of New York to cite Catch of the Day as "strikingly original in timing", protectable by copyright, in his 2005 decision in Mannion v. Coors Brewing Co., which considered at length what in a photograph makes it original and copyrightable after a photographer sued over an image in a beer ad that appeared to be a close copy of one of his that had been used as a model:

Copyright based on originality in timing is limited by the principle that copyright in a photograph ordinarily confers no rights over the subject matter. Thus, the copyright in Catch of the Day does not protect against subsequent photographs of bears feasting on salmon in the same location. Furthermore, if another photographer were sufficiently skilled and fortunate to capture a salmon at the precise moment that it appeared to enter a hungry bear's mouth—and others have tried, with varying degrees of success—that photographer, even if inspired by Mangelsen, would not necessarily have infringed his work because Mangelsen's copyright does not extend to the natural world he captured.

Other photographs of bears catching fish at Brooks Falls
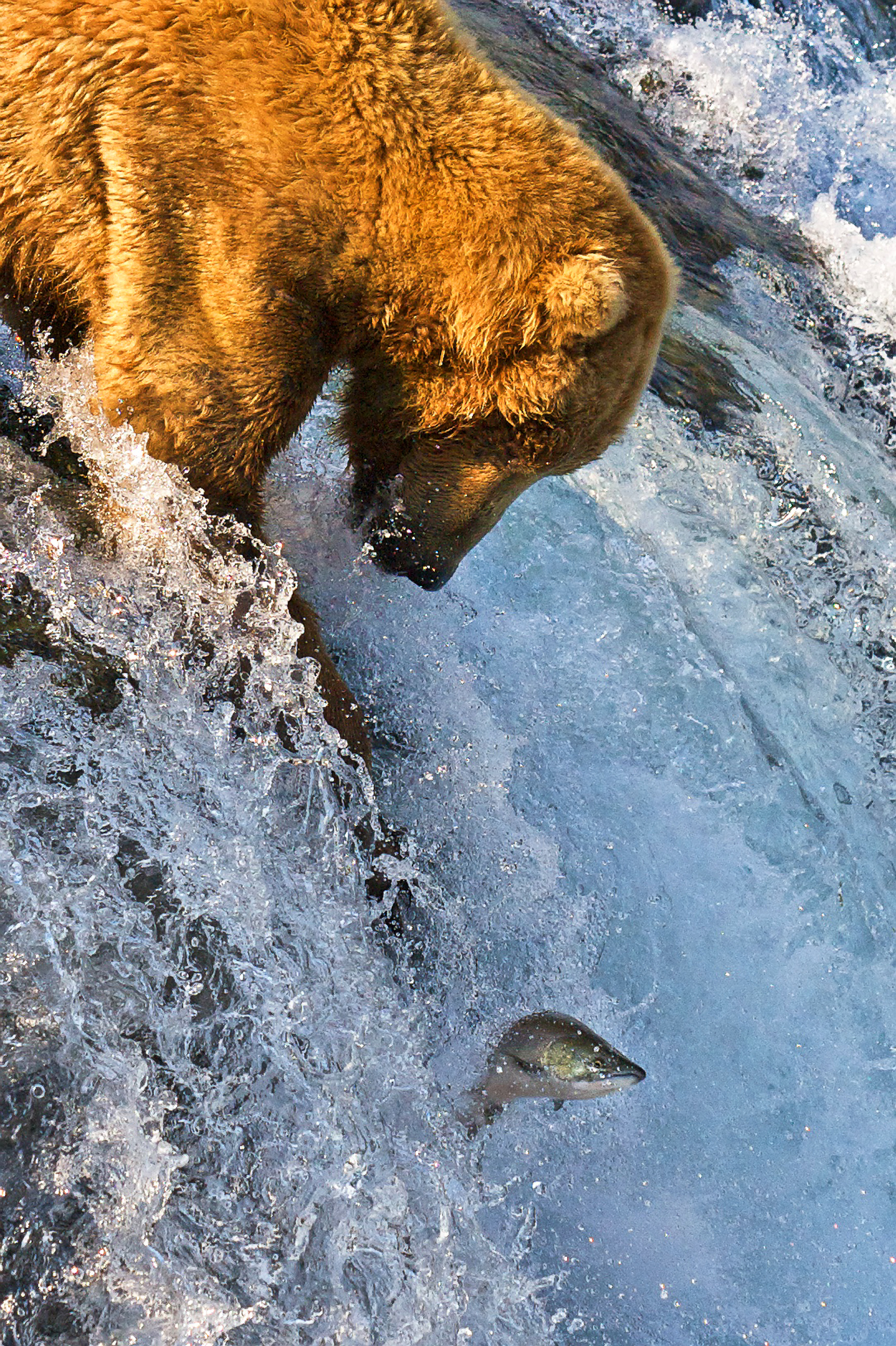
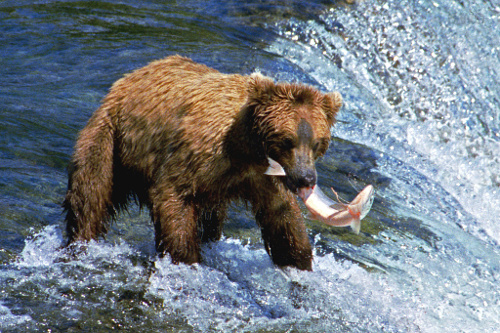
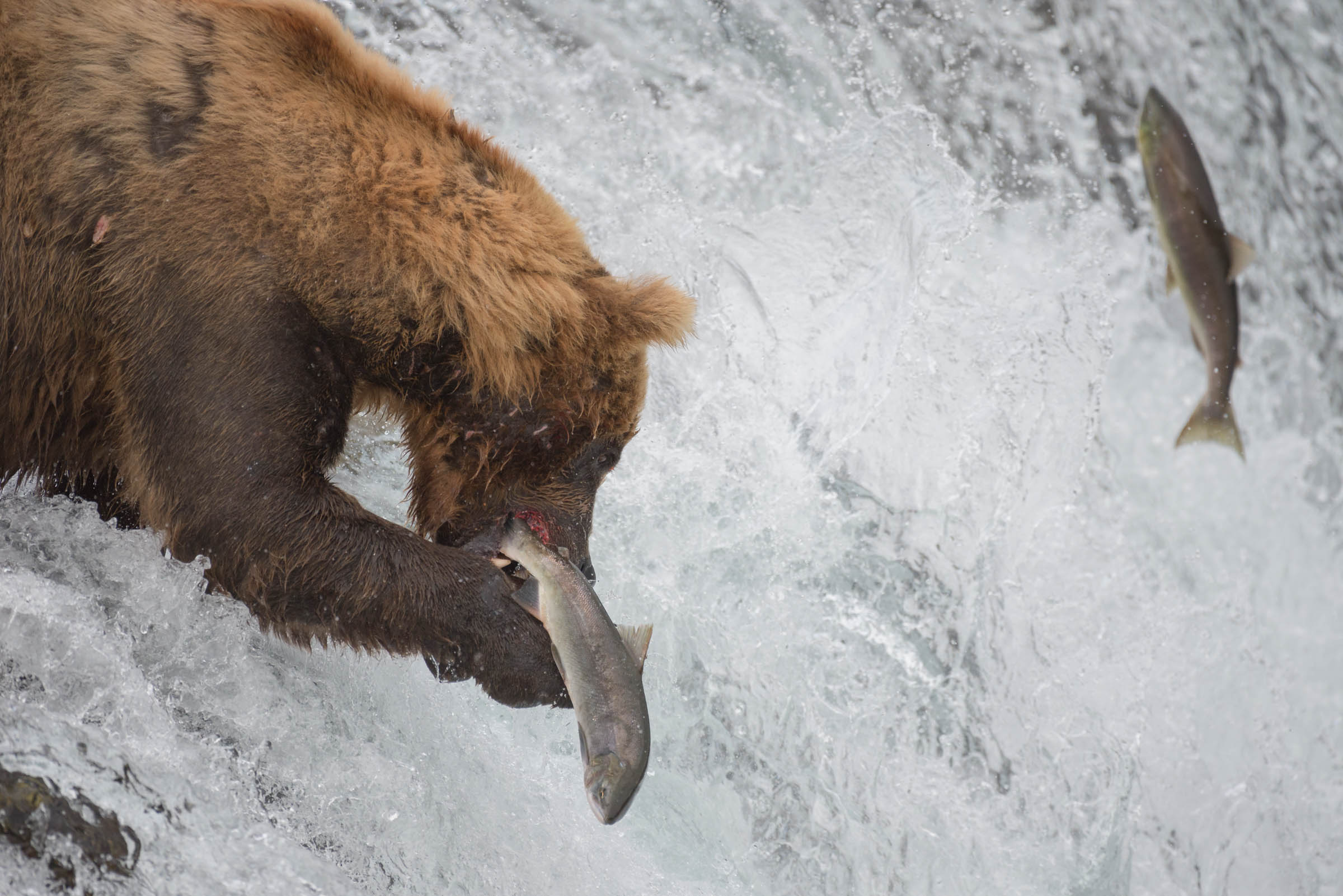

External image
- Another image of a brown bear at Brooks Falls about to close its mouth on a leaping fish
