= Jonathan Mannion =

Photographer and film director

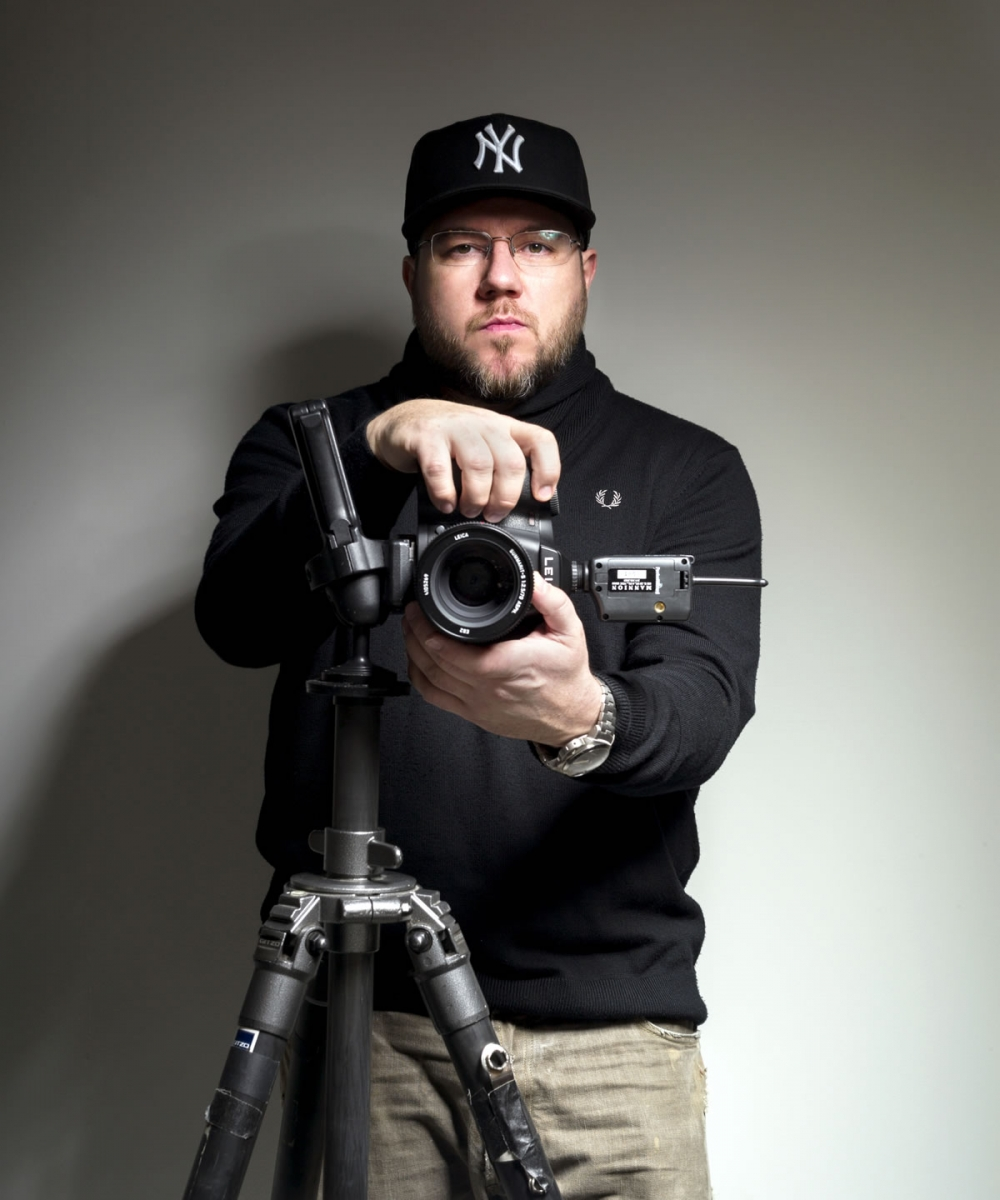
- Born: Cleveland, Ohio, U.S.
- Education: Kenyon College
- Occupations: Photographer, film director
- Website: jonathanmannion.com

Jonathan Mannion is an American photographer and film director best known for his portraits of hip-hop artists and for shooting numerous iconic album covers. He has shot album covers for hip hop and R&B performers including Dr. Dre, Jay Z, Aaliyah, Tank, Outkast, Nas, Nicki Minaj, Brandy and Kendrick Lamar.

== Early life and education ==
With English and American ancestry, Jonathan Mannion was born and raised in Cleveland, Ohio. Both of his parents worked as artists, and his mother is from London while his father is from Brooklyn. Mannion studied at Kenyon College in Ohio graduating with honors before moving from Cleveland to New York City to pursue photography.

== Career ==
Mannion began his professional photography career in the early 1990s and quickly became known for his portraiture within hip-hop culture. He has shot hundreds of album covers and editorial portraits for artists across hip-hop and R&B. Mannion worked for a year with photographer Richard Avedon in his Manhattan studio. Mannion also worked with photographers Ben Watts, Steven Klein, and Marc Hom.

In 1996, he photographed Brooklyn rapper Jay-Z for his debut album, Reasonable Doubt. In addition to music photography, Mannion has produced advertising and commercial work for brands and campaigns including Beats by Dre's "Strateg Outta _____" campaign, Cadillac, and Bushmills. Mannion has also contributed editorial photography to magazines and outlets such as The Fader, Vibe, and Complex.

== Exhibitions and published work ==
Mannion's photographic work has been exhibited in galleries and included in group shows related to hip-hop photography and culture. Prints and limited edition works by Mannion have been sold through his shop and at auction, where individual prints have appeared with varied sale prices.

== Legal matters ==
In Mannion v. Coors Brewing Co., decided July 21, 2005, Mannion successfully sued Coors Brewing Company and its advertising agency alleging that a Coors billboard reproduced the distinctive elements of Mannion's copyrighted photography of basketball player Kevin Garnett. The United States District Court for the Souther District of New York held that Mannion's photograph contained sufficient original expression to be copyrightable and denied summary judgement on the issue of substantial similarity, leaving that factual question for trial.

In June 2021, Jay-Z filed a federal lawsuit in California against Jonathan Mannion alleging that Mannion was exploiting Jay-Z's likeness by selling prints and licensing images of the rapper without his consent. The dispute between Jay-Z and Mannion was later reported to have been resolved or settled in early 2023.

== Interviews and commentary ==
Mannion has discussed his career and creative process in multiple interviews and podcasts, including a feature on XXL’s Inside Track podcast where he reflected on making rap album covers and his career in hip-hop photography. He has also appeared in video interviews and talks about specific shoots — for example, discussing the creation of the Reasonable Doubt album cover.

== Personal life ==
Mannion has one child with fiancé Andrea Hill. He maintains an active presence on social media and runs a personal website and shop featuring prints, books, and information about speaking engagements.

== Selected credits ==
- Jay-Z — Reasonable Doubt (photographer).
- Numerous album covers and editorial portraits across hip-hop and R&B artists (over 300 album covers cited in biographical material).
