= Mittermaier =

Mittermaier is a German surname. Notable people with the surname include:

- Carl Joseph Anton Mittermaier (1787–1867), German jurist
- Evi Mittermaier (born 1953), German alpine skier
- Rosi Mittermaier (1950–2023), German alpine skier

== See also ==
- Mittermeier
