= Grizzly 399 =

American grizzly bear (1996–2024)

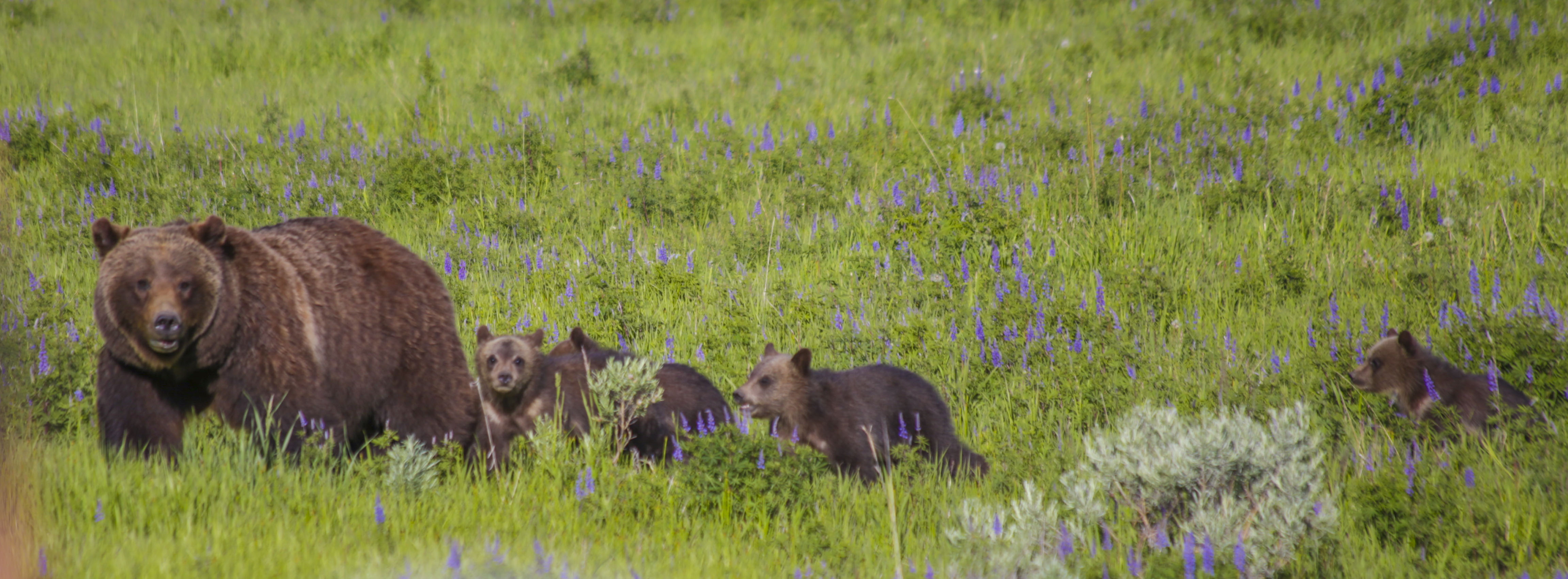
- 399 with her four cubs near the river by Signal Mountain Lodge (June 2020)
- Species: Ursus arctos horribilis
- Sex: Female
- Born: 1996; Pilgrim Creek, Wyoming, U.S.
- Died: October 22, 2024 (aged 28); Lincoln County, Wyoming, U.S.
- Cause of death: Vehicle collision
- Offspring: At least 22 cubs, including Grizzly 610

Grizzly 399 (1996 – October 22, 2024) was a grizzly bear living in Grand Teton National Park and Bridger-Teton National Forest in Wyoming, United States. She was followed by as many as 40 wildlife photographers, and millions of tourists came to the Greater Yellowstone Ecosystem to see her and other grizzly bears. There are official Facebook, Twitter, and Instagram accounts for Grizzly 399.

== Background ==
Grizzly bears (Ursus arctos horribilis) are a subspecies of the North American Brown bear species U. arctos. Several decades ago, grizzlies were assessed as being at risk of rapid extinction due to the rate at which the population was declining. Protection under the Endangered Species Act of 1973 has resulted in a population rebound: there are now approximately 2,000 grizzly bears in the contiguous United States, of which about half are estimated to live in the Greater Yellowstone Ecosystem. Grizzlies are stereotyped as ferocious, but the typical bear avoids contact with humans, living away from settlements and attacking only to protect themselves when startled by a human.

== Life ==
Grizzly 399 was a grizzly bear who resided on federal land in a range of hundreds of miles throughout the Grand Teton National Park and the Bridger-Teton National Forest. She was born in a den in Pilgrim Creek, Wyoming, in the winter of 1996. She was captured in 2001 and fitted with a radio collar by the Interagency Grizzly Bear Study Team. She was the 399th bear to be tracked with this method as part of the long-term research project. In 2018, monitoring of 399 via radio telemetry ceased, with the research continuing as she resided in an area where she was easily observable.

399 reached age 28, becoming older than is usual for a grizzly bear, as "more than 85 percent of them are killed because of some kind of human activity before they reach old age". She weighed almost 400 pounds (180 kg). When standing upright on her hind legs, she was 7 ft 0 in (2.13 m). Unlike the typical grizzly, she lived in close proximity to humans, although she was not particularly concerned with their presence; scientists have speculated that this was in response to a death of a cub in a more remote area, so she wanted to avoid that area. She never killed a human despite at least two known close encounters.

=== Cubs ===
Grizzly 399 successfully reared many progeny, including 22 cubs and grandcubs. In mid-May 2020 she was observed with four new cubs born the previous winter. She taught her offspring habits to benefit from rather than be harmed by human proximity, such as loitering during the fall elk hunt to consume abandoned elk innards and looking both ways before crossing roadways to avoid being struck by vehicles, a common cause of death among bears.

Despite this, at least three of her cubs were killed due to human encounters, including Grizzly 399's only 2016 cub, nicknamed "Snowy" because of his whitish-blonde facial coloration. In June of that year, Snowy was struck and killed by a car in Grand Teton National Park, an incident investigated as a potential hit-and-run accident. In all, she lost half of her descendants due to encounters with people or male bears.

On May 21, 2020, a wildlife photographer saw Grizzly 399 coming out of hibernation in Pilgrim Creek with four cubs. This was her largest brood to date. On May 16, 2023, Grizzly 399 emerged from hibernation and appeared in the area of Pilgrim Creek in Grand Teton National Park. She was seen with a single cub. At age 26 or 27, this made her the oldest female bear known to have reproduced in the Greater Yellowstone Ecosystem.

Unlike the typical bear, Grizzly 399 regularly gave birth to triplets rather than twins. This typically has a paradoxical effect on the bear population. A mother bear with three cubs expends significantly more energy in caring for them, which can potentially decrease rather than increase the survival rate. Grizzly 399, conversely, typically handled triplets well. One of her triplet cubs also grew to be a prolific mother and was tagged for research as Grizzly 610. In 2011, Grizzly 610 had twins, while Grizzly 399 had another set of triplets. The scientists observing the bears were concerned due to 399's advanced age, but to their surprise Grizzly 610 amicably adopted one of her mother's triplet cubs.

One of 399's 2017 twin cubs, numbered 964, was relocated to Yellowstone in 2019. She was spotted with twins in 2023. Grizzly 610's daughter, numbered 926, released twins in 2023.

== Relationship with humans ==
Grizzly 399 was known to be habituated to people when near roads and lightly developed areas. A researcher determined that she sought out these roadside areas rather than backcountry because it was safer for her cubs, which male bears often attempted to kill. The fact that she spent so much time near roads also contributed to her popularity. In 2011, the sight of a mother grizzly bear and her three cubs near a road in central Grand Teton National Park was enough to cause traffic to come to a halt in both directions for miles. In Willow Flats, Grizzly 399 taught each set of cubs to hunt elk calves, within view of the guests at Jackson Lake Lodge.

Grizzly 399 was usually found along the roadside near the Oxbow Bend of the Snake River. The number of photographers following her grew to approximately 40–50 by of 2015. 399 was considered the "grand matriarch of the park's roadside bears."

In 2016, Grizzly 399 was feared dead after a hunter claimed to have killed her. However, she emerged from hibernation on May 10, 2016, with one white-faced cub in tow. She moved from the Bridger-Teton National Forest into the Grand Teton National Park with the cub at her side. In 2017, despite being beyond the age at which most brown bears typically breed, she was spotted in a spring snowstorm with two twin cubs following her.

== Death ==
On the evening of October 22, 2024, Grizzly 399 was fatally struck by a vehicle on Highway 26/89 in Snake River Canyon, south of Jackson, Wyoming. The bear's identity was confirmed through ear tags and a microchip. Most of her ashes were scattered in Grand Teton National Park.

== Grand Teton Wildlife Brigade ==
Created in 2007 in response to the magnitude of visitors coming to Grand Teton to view Grizzly 399 and her cubs, the Grand Teton Wildlife Brigade keeps animals and people apart and safe. In 2011, ranger Kate Wilmot, whose official title is "bear management specialist", said that that year things had become "completely chaotic". The real duty was managing the behavior of park visitors. This was partly due to social media increasing the popularity of the bears, and drawing more people to seek them out.

Wilmot directs 16 volunteers in the brigade throughout the summer until snowfall. If not for the brigaders, "wildlife watching would be a mess". The brigaders carry bear spray, but their primary role is to persuade tourists to respect the 100-yard viewing guideline established after incidents with Grizzly 610, 399's daughter.

Feeding the bears is illegal, so the brigadiers prevent this. If bears receive food from people, they can become habituated to people and more aggressive toward them. The brigadiers remind tourists of their role in respecting bears' space. The brigadiers' success can be measured in the rarity of major incidents and bear removals from the park. When bears become too habituated to human presence and aggressive in their pursuit of human food, or when a bear attacks a human, the "problem bear" is typically euthanized. Grizzly mothers are known for being aggressively protective of their progeny. In 2011, in Yellowstone National Park, a mother bear fatally mauled a hiker who got too close. Grizzly 610, 399's daughter, twice "charged" tourists who got too close. No injuries were reported.

== Endangered species protection and hunting ==
In 2017, the United States Fish and Wildlife Service officials removed grizzly bears from the endangered species list and turned management of grizzlies outside Yellowstone and Grand Teton National Parks over to Wyoming, Montana, and Idaho. Grizzlies live in ranges covering hundreds of miles, which can place them outside of parks, where they become the targets of hunters. Grizzly 399 lived outside of the parks.

Hunters in the area targeted 399 because she was the biggest and most famous trophy. Daryl Hunter, a wildlife photographer who followed Grizzly 399, related a conversation with an outfitter who said, "I met a guy who wants Grizzly 399's rug on his wall, stating that because she is famous, she makes a better trophy". Grizzly 399 spent part of the year in Grand Teton National Park, but also hibernated in the national forest where hunting is allowed.

For the 2018 hunting season, Montana decided against a hunt. Idaho, with the fewest grizzlies, decided to allow hunting of only one bear. On May 23, 2018, the Wyoming wildlife commission voted unanimously to approve a grizzly bear hunt. The Wyoming Game and Fish Department let a vote decide the number of grizzlies to be killed. The tally came to 22 grizzlies in a unanimous vote of 7–0. The hunting season was planned for September 15 to November 15. This was to be the first authorized hunt in Wyoming in 44 years - since 1975 - a time when they were first listed as endangered, when no hunting was allowed inside the national parks or on the connecting road between them, and when the grizzly population had fallen to around 136 individuals.

Wyoming's planned hunt met with a public outcry. Five women in Jackson Hole quickly organized "Shoot'em With A Camera-Not A Gun", which encouraged opponents of trophy hunting to join the tag lottery in hopes of preventing hunters from winning tags. Approximately 7,000 people applied for Wyoming bear tags, including wildlife photographer Thomas D. Mangelsen, Jane Goodall, and other conservationists.

In July 2018, Mangelsen learned he was positioned high enough on a hunting lottery to actually receive a hunting tag, as he held slot number 8 in the queue. In September, just weeks before hunting season was to begin, a federal judge in Montana restored protection to all of the bears in the Greater Yellowstone Ecosystem. The judge ruled that the United States Fish and Wildlife Service officials were "arbitrary and capricious" when they removed protection from the bears under the Endangered Species Act of 1973. In July 2020, the Ninth Circuit Court of Appeals upheld the Montana judge's ruling.

In March 2021, the U.S. Fish and Wildlife Service recommended no change to the protection status of the grizzly bear in the lower-48 states. According to the ESA after a five-year status review, they remained threatened .

== In popular culture ==
=== Television ===
A television documentary "Grizzly 399: Queen of the Tetons" was produced, which PBS broadcast on May 8, 2024 as an episode of Nature. The one-hour show covers a period between May 2020 and Spring 2023, in which photographers, conservationists, biologists, residents, ranchers, and other concerned individuals discuss the impact of 399 and her four cubs on the community, highlighting the debate over delisting grizzlies as an endangered species. It was nominated for an Emmy Award in the category of Outstanding Nature Documentary.

=== Books ===
Grizzly 399: The Story of a Remarkable Bear is a children's book published in May 2020 in Idaho Falls. The book is written by Sylvia M. Medina, illustrated by Morgan Spicer and includes photographs by American nature and wildlife photographer, Thomas D. Mangelsen. The publisher published a subsequent book with the same author, illustrator and photographer in April 2021 to include Grizzly 399's new cubs, titled, "Grizzly 399's Hibernation Pandemonium" after the 24-year-old mother bear surprised the world with the birth of four more cubs in the spring of 2020.

Grizzlies of Pilgrim Creek In 2015, Thomas D. Mangelsen collaborated with Wilkinson to create the book about Grizzly 399 and her progeny. Mangelsen made it one of his priorities for over ten years to record her life, including her hibernation schedule, feeding, and mothering; he recorded the birth of three sets of triplets and a set of twins. His photographs, especially the one he dubbed, "An Icon of Motherhood", helped make her the most famous mother grizzly, maybe the most famous grizzly, in the world. Millions of people visit the Greater Yellowstone Ecosystem just to see these grizzly bears.

=== Facebook account ===
By 2015, Grizzly 399 had a full social media presence, although it was a mystery who is running the accounts. She had her own Facebook page, Instagram account, and a Twitter handle. "These aren't just any bears", explained Thomas D. Mangelsen, a global wildlife photographer who lives in Jackson Hole, Wyoming, "They might be the most famous grizzlies alive today on the planet. For all these people, catching a glimpse of them is the thrill of a lifetime." Mangelsen followed her movements for over ten years. Grizzly 399 dispelled the stereotype that all grizzlies are agents of terror, wrote Bozeman author Todd Wilkinson: "She's more well-behaved a lot of times than people around her. But she's wild."

== See also ==
- List of individual bears
- The Boss (bear)
