= The Boss (bear) =

Grizzly bear in Canada

- Species: Ursus arctos horribilis
- Sex: Male
- Born: ca. 1997 (age 28–29)

The Boss, known as Bear 122, is a male grizzly bear from Banff National Park in Alberta, Canada. He has been described as a Canadian equivalent of Grizzly 399. It is believed that he fathered around half of the bear cubs in the park, and weighs approximately 300 kilograms.

== Life and activity ==
Weighing in at approximately 300 kilograms, Bear 122 has an extensive range of over 2,500 square kilometres throughout Banff, Yoho, and Kootenay National Parks. He has grown "relatively habituated to humans," frequently crossing high-speed, heavy-traffic highways, including the Trans-Canada Highway, Highway 93S and railways. Of the 65 grizzly bears in Banff National Park, Bear 122 is believed to have fathered approximately half the cubs.

The Boss is believed to have survived multiple train strikes, with one confirmed in 2010 near Vermillon Lakes. In 2025 a grizzly bear was reportedly struck by a train just east of Castle Mountain, with concern it was Bear 122. Despite that, tracking data shows that he continues to use the railways heavily, frequently scavenging for food along tracks in search of spilled grain or animal carcasses from train strikes.

In August 2013, a trail was closed after he was found eating a black bear. The bear has sometimes roamed into urban areas. Removals have been prompted of fruit trees to avoid attracting him. Another bear in the area, Split Lip, is also well known and has come into conflict with The Boss. In an internal email, wildlife officials state “with his advanced age, declining condition, recent history of hitting multiple unnatural food rewards, high level of habituation, and changing behaviour towards staff, we have growing public/staff safety concerns and would like to manage 122 more aggressively, consistently, and proactively across the FU (field unit) boundaries.”

== Popularity ==
The bear has gained a large following online, with many images of him shared on social media. Safety concerns have been raised, with warnings to keep distance. The bear was the inspiration for the children's book The Little Grizzly Who Walked Like a Boss by author Victoria Tudor.

== See also ==
- List of individual bears
