= Sigma 105mm f/2.8 EX DG lens =

105mm f/2.8 APO Macro EX DG
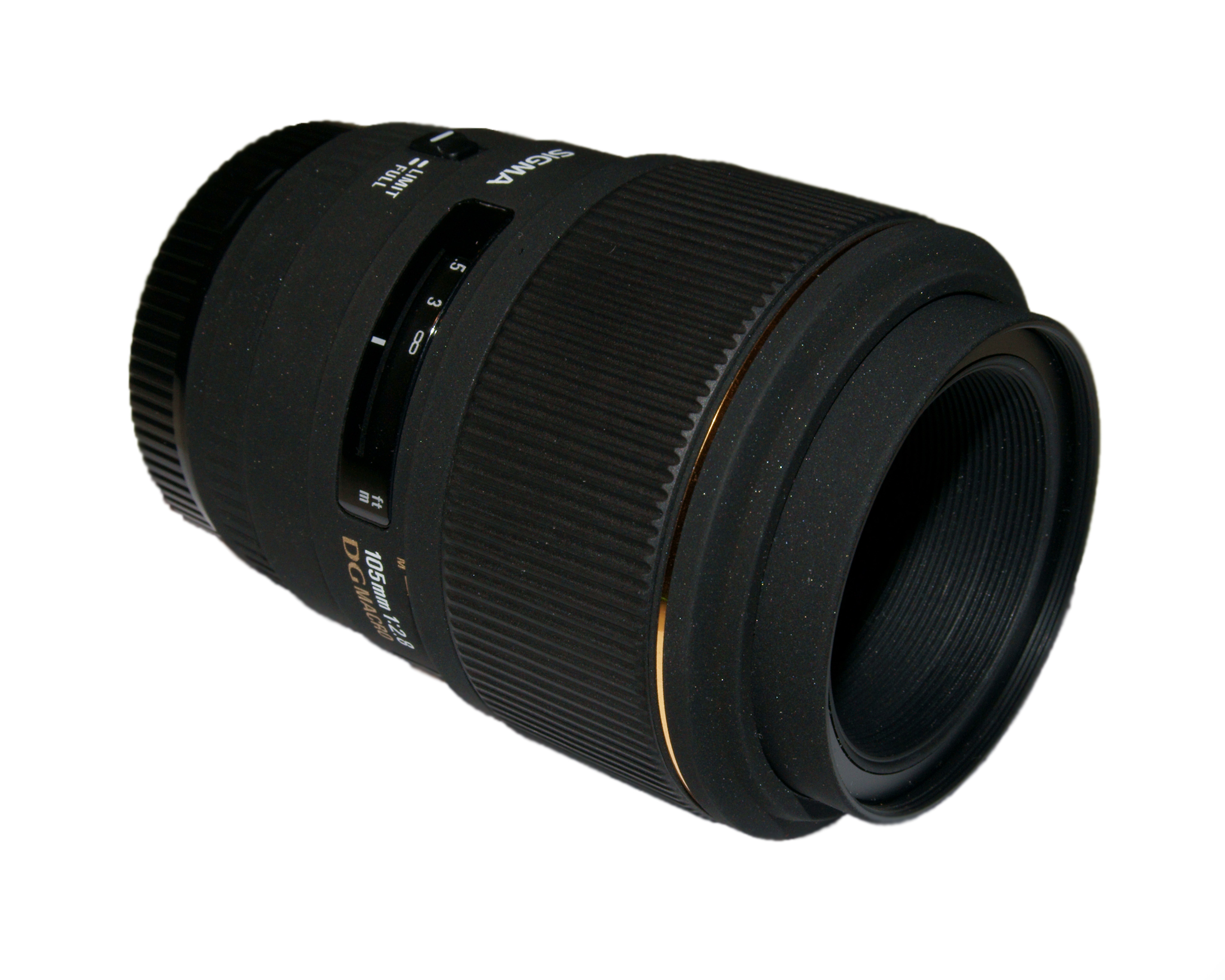
- Maker: Sigma Corporation

Technical data
- Focal length: 105mm
- Aperture (max/min): f/2.8 - f/45
- Close focus distance: 31.3 cm.
- Max. magnification: 1:1
- Diaphragm blades: 8
- Construction: 11 elements in 10 groups

Features
- Short back focus: No No
- Lens-based stabilization: No No
- Macro capable: Yes Yes
- Application: Macro

Physical
- Max. length: 97.5 mm.
- Diameter: 74 mm.
- Weight: 460 g
- Filter diameter: 58 mm

Retail info
- MSRP: 640 USD

The Sigma 105mm f/2.8 EX DG is a macro lens produced by Sigma Corporation. The lens has six different variates, fitting on the Sigma SA mount, Canon EF mount, Four Thirds System, Pentax K mount, Minolta A-mount, and the Nikon F-mount.
