= Paul Nicklen =

Canadian photojournalist and conservationist

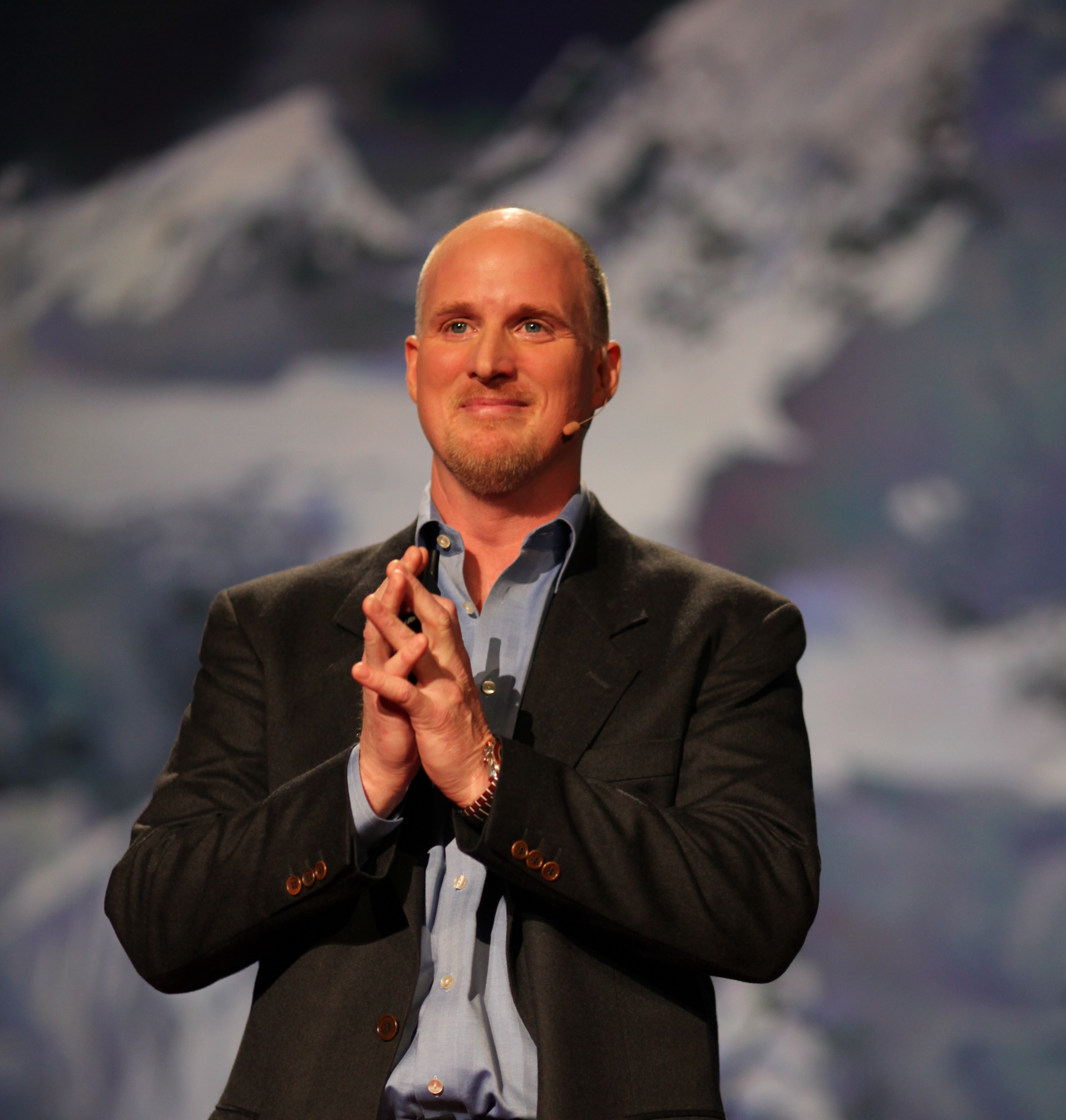
- Born: Paul Nicklen; Tisdale, Saskatchewan, Canada
- Education: University of Victoria
- Occupation: photojournalist
- Employer: National Geographic
- Known for: Author, Polar Obsession, Photographer, National Geographic Magazine.
- Website: www.paulnicklen.com

Paul Nicklen is a Canadian photographer, film-maker, author and marine biologist.

== Early life ==
Paul Nicklen was born in Tisdale, Saskatchewan, Canada. By the mid-seventies, Paul's family - made up of his parents, a teacher and mechanic, and his brother, moved to the tiny Inuit town of Kimmirut on Baffin Island in Canada’s Arctic Circle. The Nicklen family was one of four non-Inuit families in the area, as mentioned in his book Born To Ice.

== Career ==
Since the beginning of his career in conservation photography, Nicklen has quickly become one of the most renowned Canadian photographers for National Geographic Magazine, and has published eleven stories for National Geographic. Nicklen is a member of the International League of Conservation Photographers (ILCP). He has written several books.

Major exhibits of his work include Extreme Exposure at the Annenberg Space for Photography in Los Angeles, California in 2009 and more recently, he opened the Paul Nicklen Gallery in Soho, New York City, from April 2017 to June 2018 as a space for conservationist photographers and other artists to participate in the fine art scene.

In 2011, Nicklen was a speaker at TED2011.

In 2014, Nicklen co-founded an organization that uses visual storytelling and photography to further the cause of ocean conservation with modern conservation photography pioneer Cristina Mittermeier. The foundation is a non-profit.

== Awards ==
Nicklen has been awarded the BBC Wildlife Photographer of the Year and the World Press Photo for Photojournalism." He has also received awards from Pictures of the Year International, Communication Arts, and the Natural Resources Defense Council BioGems Visionary Award.

- World Press Photo First Prize, Nature Stories 2003
- World Press Photo First Prize, Nature Stories 2006
- World Press Photo Second prize, Nature Stories 2007
- World Press Photo Third Prize, Nature Stories 2007
- World Press Photo First Prize, Nature Stories 2009
- World Press Photo First Prize, Nature Stories 2010
- Award of Excellence, Pictures of the Year International Competition 2010
- Wildlife Photographer of the Year, BBC Wildlife and Natural History Museum 2012
- World Press Photo First Prize, Nature Stories 2013
- Lifetime Achievement Award, University of Victoria, British Columbia, Canada
- Honorary Doctor of Science, University of Victoria, British Columbia, Canada

== Publications ==
- Nicklen, Paul (2026). Paul Nicklen: A Photography Masterclass. Frances Lincoln. ISBN 978-1-83600-981-8
- Nicklen, Paul; Brody, Hugh (2000). Seasons of the Arctic. San Francisco: Sierra Club Books. ISBN 157805057X.
- Nicklen, Paul (2009). Polar Obsession. Washington, D.C.: National Geographic Society. ISBN 978-1426205118.
- Nicklen, Paul (2013). Bear-Spirit of the Wild. Washington, D.C.: National Geographic Society. ISBN 978-1426211768.
- Photographing Wild - Techniques of a National Geographic photographer (eBook) - 2016
- Nicklen, Paul; Di Caprio, Leonardo (2018). Born to Ice. Washington, D.C.: Teneues. ISBN 978-3961711239.

== See also ==
- Thomas D. Mangelsen
