= Cristina Mittermeier =

Mexican photographer and biologist (born 1966)

Cristina Goettsch Mittermeier
- Born: Cristina Sofía Goettsch Cabello; November 26, 1966 (age 59); Mexico City, Mexico
- Citizenship: Mexico; Canada
- Education: ITESM
- Occupations: Wildlife photographer; conservationist; marine biologist; author
- Spouse: Russell Mittermeier (m. 1991; div. 2008)
- Partner: Paul Nicklen (2012-present)
- Children: 2
- Awards: Leif Erikson Exploration History Award
- Website: cristinamittermeier.com

Cristina Goettsch Mittermeier (born Cristina Sofía Goettsch Cabello; November 26, 1966) is a Mexican wildlife photographer, conservationist, marine biologist, and author. She pioneered the concept and field of conservation photography, with images demonstrating the relationship between human cultures, indigenous people and biodiversity, the ocean, and climate change.

== Education ==
Mittermeier attended the Instituto Tecnologico y de Estudios Superiores de Monterrey, (ITESM), where she received an undergraduate degree in marine biology in 1989.

From 1996 to 1999 Mittermeier attended the Corcoran College for the Arts, Continuing Education Program in Washington, DC, where she received a photography associate degree.

== Career ==
=== 1990–91, Conservation International (CI) ===
Mittermeier began her career working at Conservation International Mexico as a technical associate for the Gulf of California and Selva Lacandona programs. It was during this time that she cultivated a sense of purpose for conservation work and met her now-former husband Russell Mittermeier. It was also during this time that she got her first camera. Prior to having become a professional photographer, she conducted fieldwork in the Gulf of California and the Yucatan Peninsula in subjects including marine mammals, fisheries, aquaculture, biodiversity research and conservation for CI.

=== 2005–10, International League of Conservation Photographers (ILCP) ===
Mittermeier founded the International League of Conservation Photographers (ILCP), a non-profit organization founded in 2005 and consisting of photographers from around the world, with the goal of using photography as a tool to drive environmental and conservation efforts worldwide. Mittermeier served as founder, president and fellow until her departure from the organization in 2010.

=== 2006–2018, Wild Foundation ===
Mittermeier served on the board of trustees of the Wild Foundation.

=== 2007–2024, Cemex Conservation Book Series ===
Mittermeier served as the series editor of the Cemex Conservation book series; a series of books produced by Cemex, a cement manufacturer located in Mexico, illustrating strategies and diverse approaches to fostering the protection of our natural world, complemented with powerful images from the world's best photographers.

=== 2014–present, SeaLegacy ===
Alongside her partner and fellow nature photographer Paul Nicklen, Mittermeier co-founded and serves as President of SeaLegacy, an environment protection organization, which works alongside filmmakers, conservationists and photographers, with the mission to use strategic communications at the intersection of art, science, and conservation to protect and rewild the ocean within our lifetimes.

== Personal life ==
Cristina Mittermeier has two children with Russell Mittermeier. Michael Mittermeier, born in 1992, and Juliana Mittermeier, born in 1996. She also has one stepson, John Mittermeier, born in 1985, from her husbands first marriage.

Cristina married Russell Mittermeier in 1991, and the couple moved to Great Falls, Virginia to raise their children. It is with him that she has coauthored several books. The two divorced in 2008 and remain amicable. They continue to work together on many conservation efforts including the CEMEX conservation book series.

Mittermeier met Paul Nicklen in 2010, bonding over their mutual love of photography, the ocean and conservation. They have been partners since 2012, residing on Vancouver Island, British Columbia.

== Bibliography ==
Cristina Mittermeier has edited or coauthored twenty-seven books, including the CEMEX Conservation Book Series.

- Amaze
- Hotspots: Earth's Biologically Richest and Most Endangered Terrestrial Ecoregions
- Megadiversity: Earths Biologically Wealthiest Nations
- Wildlife Spectacles
- Hotspots Revisited: Earth's Biologically Richest and Most Endangered Terrestrial Ecoregions
- Wilderness Areas: Earth's Last Wild Places
- Transboundary Conservation: A New Vision for Protected Areas
- The Human Footprint: Challenges for Wilderness and Biodiversity
- A Climate for Life, Facing the Global Challenge
- The Wealth of Nature
- Freshwater; the Essence of Life
- Sublime Nature: Photographs That Awe and Inspire
- Pantanal: South America's Wetland Jewel
- Oceans; Heart of our Blue Planet
- A Gift of Nature; 20 Years of Conservation and Photography
- Earth's Legacy; Natural World Heritage
- A Geography of Hope; Saving the Last Primary Forests
- Back from the Brink/ Desde el Borde de la Extincion

== Awards ==
- Member of the World Photographic Academy
- 2010 — Nature's Best Conservation Photographer of the Year Award.
- 2010 — North American Nature Photography Association Mission Award.
- 2010 — The 40 Most Influential Nature Photographers. Outdoor Photographer Magazine.
- 2015/2016 — Imaging Alliance Photographers Who Give Back, New York, NY
- 2017 — Time Magazine Top 10 Photos of the Year
- 2017 — National Geographic top 10 stories of the year.
- 2018 — National Geographic Adventurer of the Year
- 2020 — Botanical Research Institute of Texas- International Award of Excellence in Conservation
- 2021 — Global Vision Awards
- 2021 — Seattle Aquarium Sylvia Earle Medal
- 2021 — Humanity Content Creator Award HIPA (The Hamden International Photography Award)
- 2022 — Doctorate of Fine Art. Honorary PhD, Simon Fraser University
- 2022 — Distinguished Environmental Leadership Award

== See also ==
- Nature photography
- Wildlife photography
