= Wildlife photography =

Photography genre

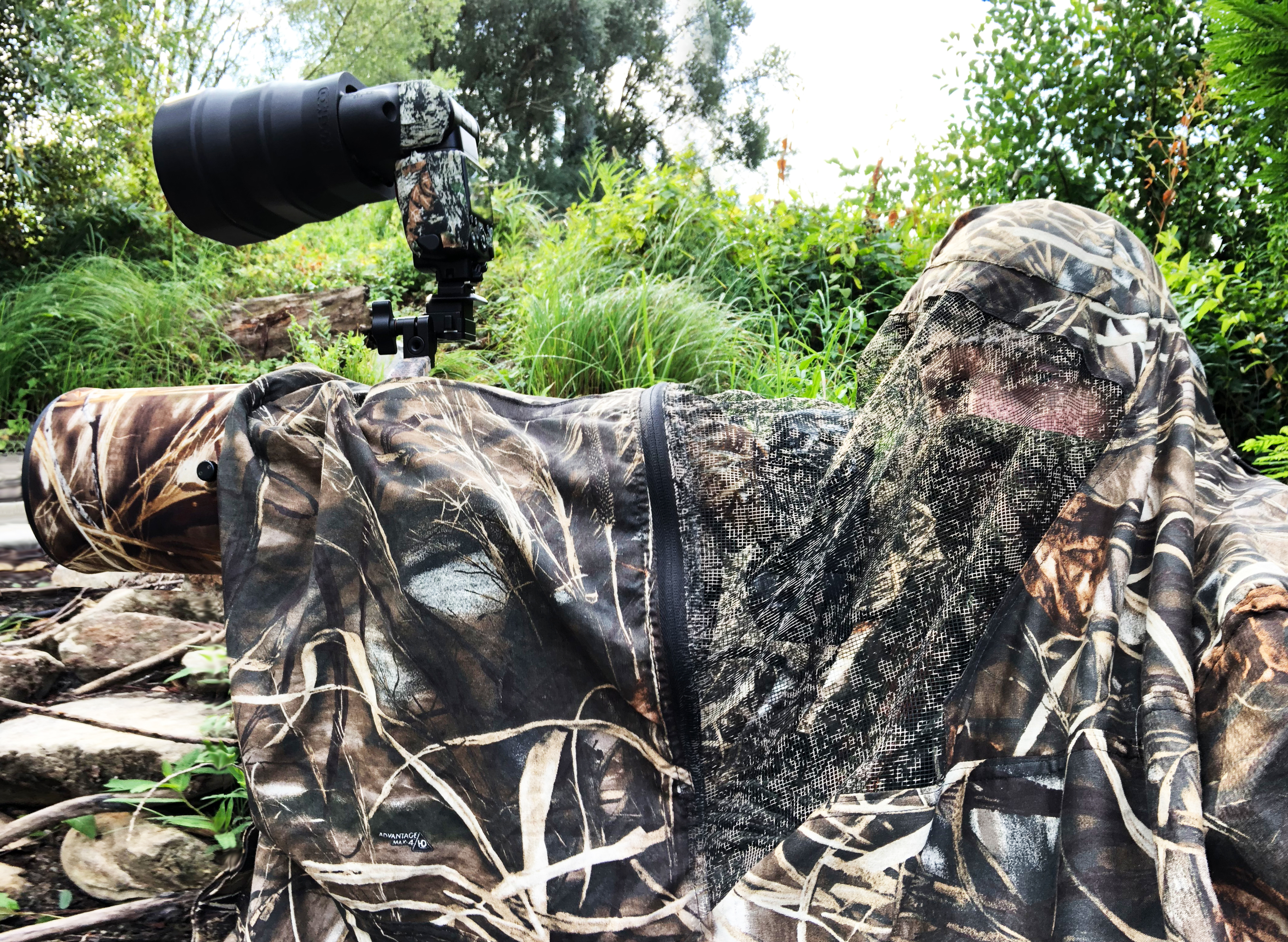
Wildlife photographer under the portable hide.

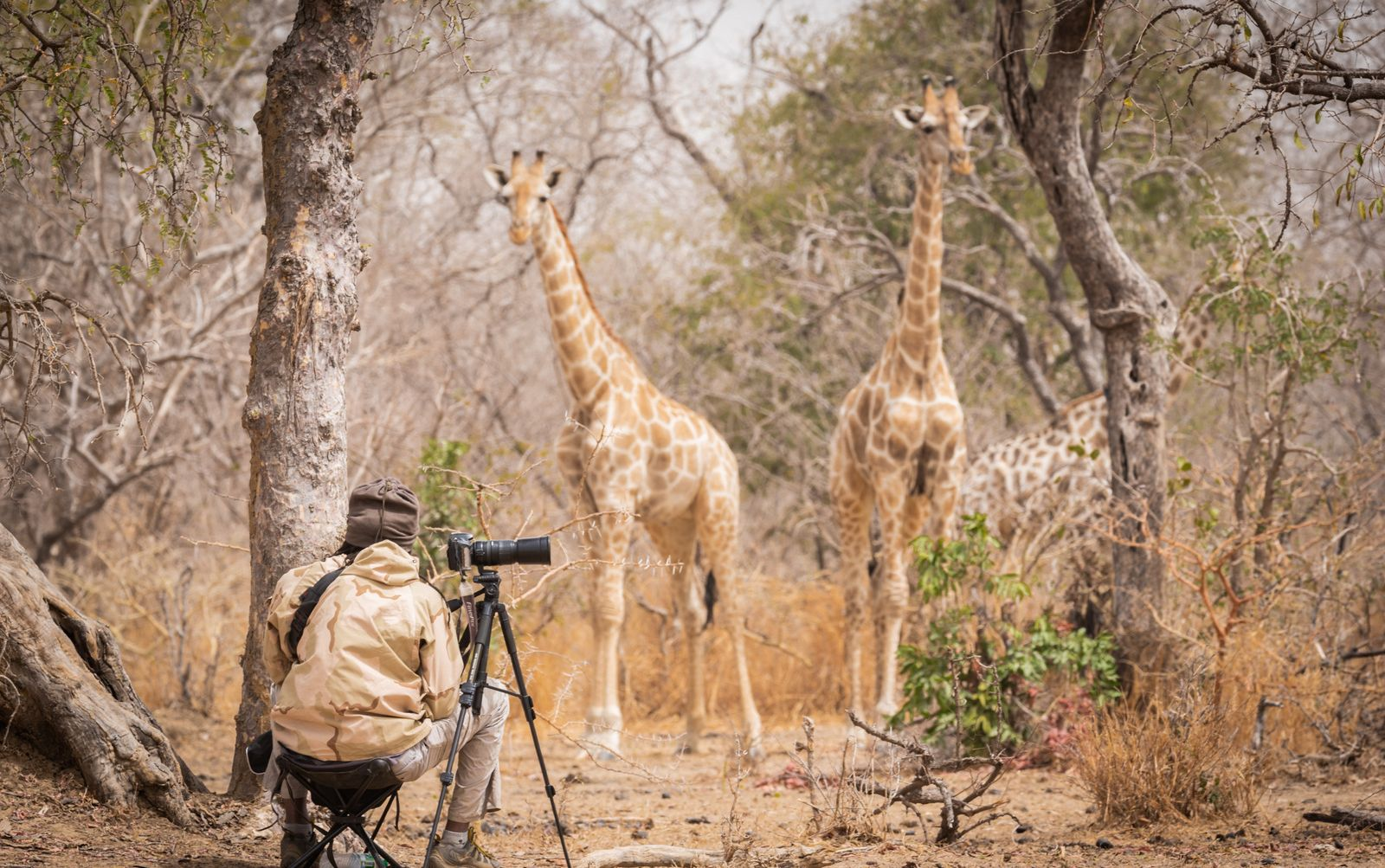
Wildlife photographer observing giraffes in Sumu Wildlife Park in Bauchi state, Nigeria.

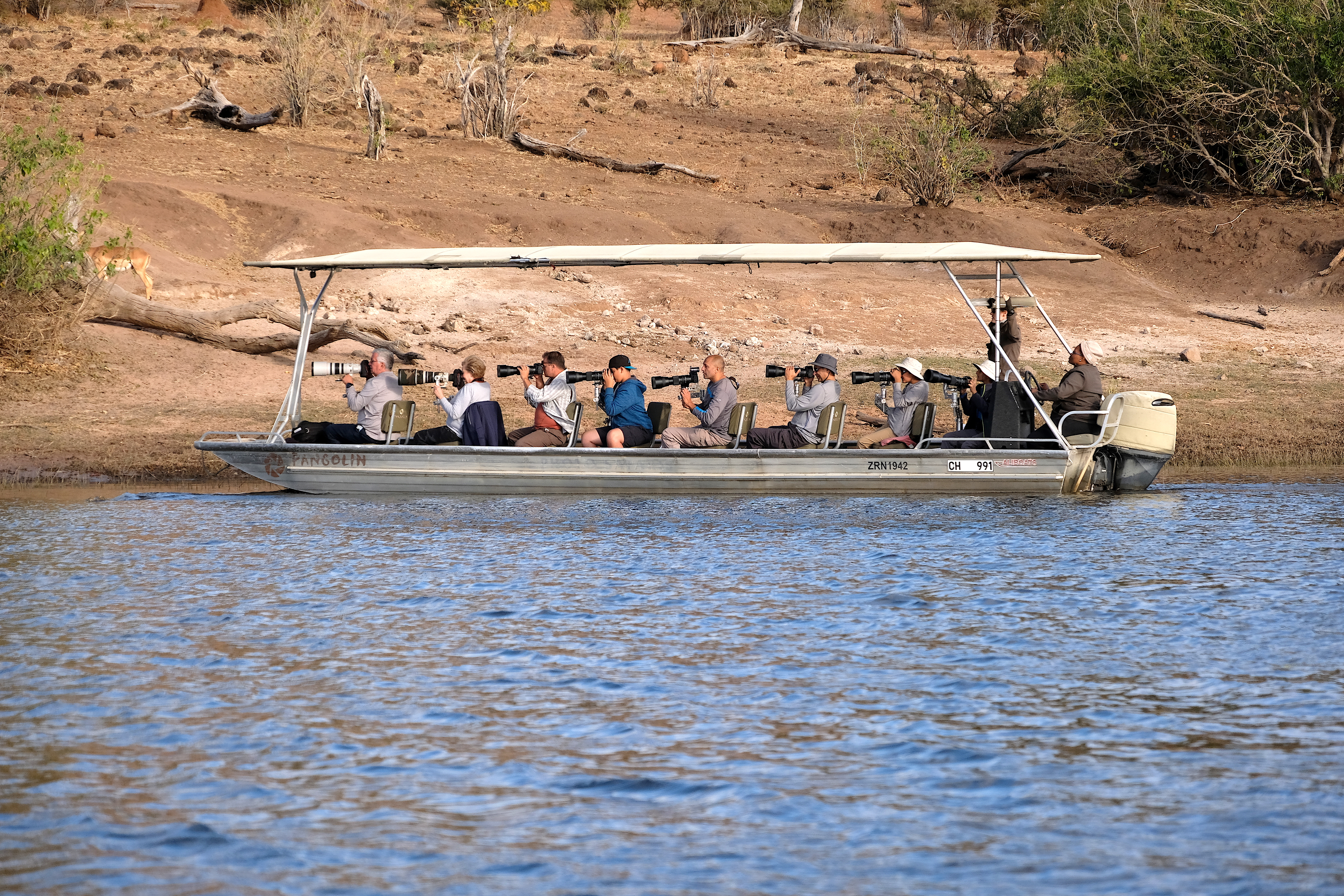
Hobby photographers taking pictures of wildlife at the Chobe River / Botswana (2018).

Wildlife photography is a genre of photography concerned with documenting various forms of wildlife in their natural habitat.

As well as requiring photography skills, wildlife photographers may need field craft skills. For example, some animals and birds are difficult to approach and thus a knowledge of the animal's and birds behavior is needed in order to be able to predict its actions. Photographing some species may require stalking skills or the use of a hide/blind for concealment.

While wildlife photographs can be taken using basic equipment, successful photography of some types of wildlife requires specialist equipment, such as macro lenses for insects, long focal length lenses for birds and underwater cameras for marine life.

== History ==
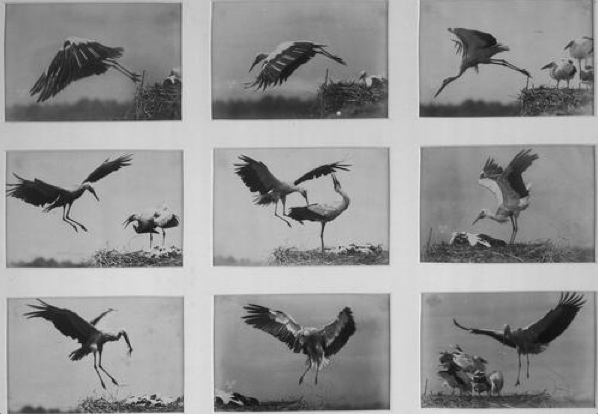
Ottomar Anschütz's images of white storks (Ciconia ciconia), taken in 1884

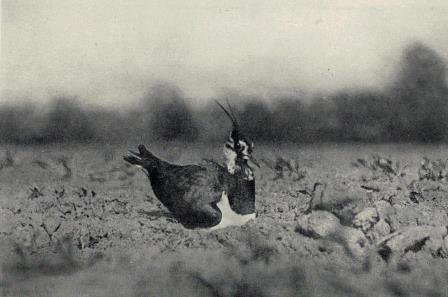
Photograph of a Lapwing (Vanellus vanellus) incubating its eggs, for which in 1895 R. B. Lodge received from the Royal Photographic Society the first medal ever presented for nature photography. Eric Hosking and Harold Lowes stated their belief – incorrectly – that this was the first photograph of a wild bird.

In the early days of photography, it was very difficult to get a photograph of wildlife due to slow lenses and the low sensitivity of photographic media. Earlier photos of animals were often of captive ones. These included photos of lion cubs taken at the Bristol zoo in 1854 and in 1864, photos of the last Quagga by Frank Hayes.

Wildlife photography gained more traction when faster photography emulsions and quicker shutters came in the 1880s. Developments like these lead to photos such as the ones taken by German Ottomar Anschutz in 1884, the first shots of wild birds in action. In 1894 wildlife photographer Mary Augusta Wallihan and her husband Allan published a book of photographs they had taken of wildlife in the Rocky Mountains.

Members of the Delaware Valley Ornithological Club (DVOC) captured early photographs of nesting songbirds in the Philadelphia area in 1897. In July 1906, National Geographic published its first wildlife photos. The photos were taken by George Shiras III, a U.S. Representative from Pennsylvania. Some of his photos were taken with the first wire-tripped camera traps.

== Definition ==
The world's three largest photography organisations, the Photographic Society of America, the Fédération Internationale de l'Art Photographique and the Royal Photographic Society have adopted a common definition for nature and wildlife photography to govern photography competitions, their respective presidents writing in a joint statement, "The development of a common definition for nature and wildlife photography will be an important step in helping photographers, many of whom enter competitions internationally, know what the rules are. It will also provide organisers with a very clear definition when they need to deal with the problem of ineligible images."

== Equipment ==
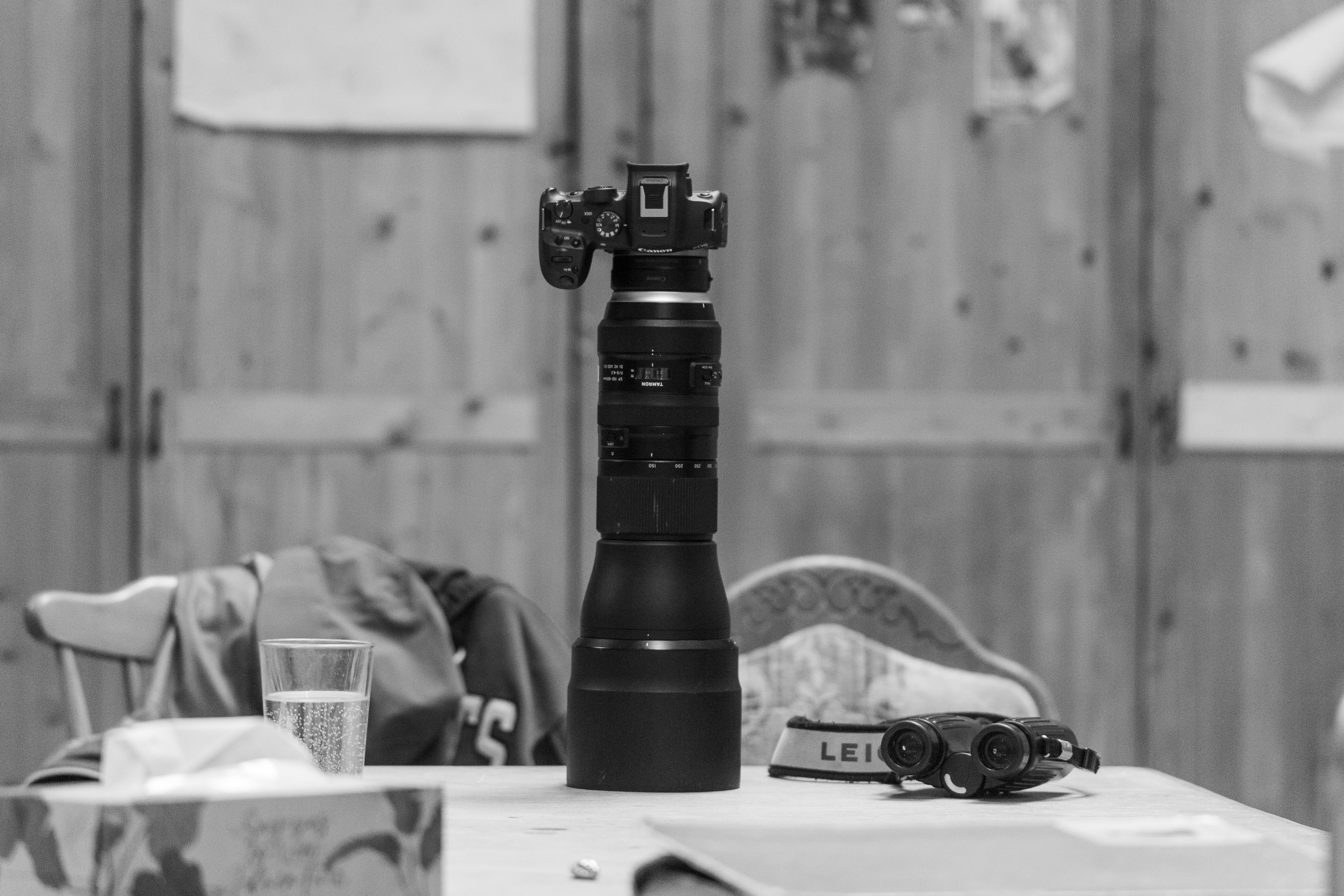
Zoom lenses are often used for wildlife Photography (Canon EOS-R10 + Tamron SP 150-600mm).

Equipment for wildlife photography can be very specialized.

Some other specialized gear includes camera traps, hides, ghillie suits and flash extenders.

== Notable wildlife photographers ==
- Nick Brandt
- Charlie Hamilton James
- Beverly Joubert
- Dereck Joubert
- Cristina Mittermeier
- Paul Nicklen
- Marsel van Oosten
- Ami Vitale
- David Yarrow
- Thomas Mangelsen

== See also ==
- BeetleCam
- Digiscoping
- Escape distance of animals
- High-speed photography
- National Wildlife magazine
- Nature photographers
- Nature photography
- Project Noah
- Wildlife observation
