= Project Noah =

Project Noah is an online community dedicated to explore and document wildlife across the globe. "Noah" is an acronym for "networked organisms and habitats".

This community formerly had an iPhone app in iTunes and an Android app in Google Play, but is now web only. Project Noah aims to become a common mobile platform for documenting the world's organisms. Beyond documentation, the iPhone app offers users an opportunity to participate in ongoing citizen science research projects by tagging contributions into specific field missions and can be used as a location-based field guide as well. All contributors are connected with an online community.

The project's co-founder, Yasser Ansari, believes that "not only is there an educational need and an environmental need but a deep, deep human need for all of us to reconnect with our planet." Project Noah has won several awards. Currently, Project Noah has contributors from over 55 countries participating in a variety of missions ranging from documenting the impact of the Gulf Coast oil spill to sharing ladybug and squirrel sightings for ongoing research at major universities. They're a project of condor.org. The project has featured by several news sources including CNN, Brian Lehrer TV, New York Times, Slate, Gizmodo, US News, Make Magazine, TreeHugger, Council for the Internet of Things, IBM's Smarter Planet and GOOD.
