= Thomas D. Mangelsen =

American wildlife photographer (born 1946)

- Born: January 6, 1946 (age 80); Grand Island, Nebraska, US
- Known for: Photography
- Notable work: Nature and wildlife photographs

Thomas D. Mangelsen (born January 6, 1946) is an American nature and wildlife photographer and conservationist. He is most famous for his photography of wildlife in the Greater Yellowstone Ecosystem, as he has lived inside the zone in Jackson, Wyoming, for over 40 years. In 2015, he and nature author Todd Wilkinson created a book, The Grizzlies of Pilgrim Creek, featuring a grizzly bear known as Grizzly 399, named so due to her research number. He has been active in the movement to keep the Yellowstone area grizzly bears on the Endangered Species List. Mangelsen is also known for trekking to all seven continents to photograph a diverse assortment of nature and wildlife. A photograph he took in 1988, Catch of the Day, has been labeled "the most famous wildlife photograph in the world". In May 2018, he was profiled on CBS's 60 Minutes. He has received dozens of accolades throughout the decades.

== Background ==
Thomas D. Mangelsen was born on January 6, 1946, in Grand Island, Nebraska. His sportsman father took him on trips on the nearby Platte River. Mangelsen and his brothers went hunting, fishing, and trapping with their father for ducks and geese. Their father also took them to observe the sandhill crane migration, and other waterfowl through his blinds. It was when Mangelsen was 21 that he became involved in photography.

=== Education ===
- 1965–1967 University of Nebraska, Business
- 1967–1969 Doane College, Crete, Nebraska, Biology BS
- University of Nebraska, Zoology, Postgraduate Studies
- Colorado State University, Wildlife Biology, Postgraduate Studies

== Career ==
Mangelsen spent most of his adult life observing and photographing the American wilderness. After moving to Nederland, Colorado, in 1970, he spent a couple of years there living in an abandoned mining shack with no facilities, with two dogs and a raccoon. He honed his photography skills and studied at the University of Colorado Boulder Mountain Research Station. The university is near Nederland, which made it easy for him to study arctic alpine ecology while living in the shack. Mangelsen desired to create a documentary featuring the Platte River, so he returned annually in the spring to film the sandhill crane migration. This led to Mangelsen following the cranes to their nesting areas in Alaska and wintering range in Texas.

=== Wildlife and nature photography ===
National Geographic planned to make a documentary about the whooping crane, which is endangered, so when they discovered Mangelsen's experiences, they hired him as the cinematographer for their television documentary Flight of the Whooping Crane. It was released in 1984 and earned an Emmy Award nomination. In 1990, PBS Nature and BBC Natural World hired Mangelsen to work on their documentary, Cranes of the Grey Wind. Mangelsen photographed and produced the film, which documents the lifecycle of the sandhill crane. Not long after, the International Institute of Photographic Arts retained a permanent collection of 21 prints of his work.

Early in the 1970s, Mangelsen started selling prints of his images of birds in flight. As Mangelsen's main interest was photographing birds, in 1978 he opened his first photography gallery in Jackson, Wyoming, the Images of Nature Gallery. As his popularity grew, Mangelsen continued expanding and today there are over 13 galleries across the country. Mangelsen also became involved in conservationism.

A photograph that Mangelsen took in 1988 is symbolic of his career. The photograph labeled "Catch of the Day" is "the most famous wildlife photograph in the world", and it typifies Mangelsen's approach to photography. An exhibition of his work was on display in September 2018 in the Durham Museum "Thomas D. Mangelsen: A Life in the Wild", and it premiered in Omaha, Nebraska. It was a traveling exhibition that highlighted 40 "Legacy Reserve" photographs taken from the approximately four million shots of his career.

Mangelsen has worked with several authors over the years to illustrate their books with his photographs. He has also produced his own books of his photography. One example is his book The Natural World: Portraits of Earth's Great Ecosystems, featuring a foreword by primatologist Jane Goodall. The book was awarded the Benjamin Franklin top honor in the Coffee Table/Large Format category by the Independent Publishers Association in 2007. He also co-founded a non-profit organization for cougars, The Cougar Fund. He is a founding Fellow of the International League of Conservation Photographers. He sits on the International Advisory Council for the Jane Goodall Institute. He also acts as a Board Ambassador for the Jackson Hole Conservation Alliance.

Now in 2019, at 73 years old, Mangelsen has established himself as one of the best wildlife photographers and conservationists in the world. His photography has been displayed in countless books, magazines, galleries, and museums. Such magazines include National Geographic, Audubon, Smithsonian, Natural History, Newsweek, Wildlife Art, American Photo, National Wildlife, and countless others. He has also embraced other media for a younger audience which is available through his galleries. Photographing wildlife involves lots of preparation, planning, and patience. He says most people do not realize how much time goes into professional photography of wildlife. "Certain things I plan a year in advance, and certain things I do every year," Mangelsen says. "I go back to Nebraska to photograph cranes on the Platte because that's where I grew up, and I love cranes, and I love being there." He also plans trips to Africa annually, and other expeditions on an irregular basis.

Mangelsen's life work is best summed up in his own words:

May these images inspire you to experience and preserve the wonders of our natural world.

=== CBS 60 Minutes appearance ===
On May 6, 2018, Mangelsen, who lives in Jackson Hole, Wyoming, appeared on an episode of CBS 60 Minutes with reporter Anderson Cooper. The discussion highlighted some of his most significant experiences in wildlife photography. The previous September, for example, he waited a long time for a subject to arrive at a spot in Grand Teton National Park in Wyoming. The subject turned out to be an elk. And he told Cooper that the amount of time he has waited for subjects is "stupid". But he is also known for his patience; as he noted, if "You wait long enough, it does pay off". The longest he has spent waiting in one spot is 42 days for one cougar, comprising 12 to 14 hours per day with breaks to sleep at home. He finally got the shot of the female cougar at dusk emerging from her den. The shot was important as it helped with the movement to protect cougars against humans invading their habitat.

He began selling prints from his own galleries in 1970. His work does not include any sort of digital manipulation, and is often mistaken for paintings. He also stays away from game farms or any other type of captive habitat, preferring to shoot animals only in their native habitat. "He especially likes the dangerous kind", whether it be getting too close to male polar bears who were play fighting or photographing a Bengal tiger from atop an elephant. Mangelsen has been on every continent and filmed species of every type from grizzly bears to butterflies to rhinos. Some species he has photographed are now endangered.

=== Grizzly 399 ===
One of the grizzly bears who lives in Grand Teton National Park and Bridger-Teton National Forest, and has no name, but is known by her research number is Grizzly 399. In 2015, Mangelsen collaborated with Bozeman, Montana, author Todd Wilkinson to create the book Grizzlies of Pilgrim Creek, An Intimate Portrait of 399, The Most Famous Bear of Greater Yellowstone. In 2018, she was 22 years old. Mangelsen has made it one of his priorities for over ten years to record her life. This includes her hibernation schedule, feeding, and mothering – of her over a dozen cubs, he recorded the birth of three sets of triplets and a set of twins. His photographs, especially the one he dubbed "An Icon of Motherhood", made her the most famous mother grizzly, maybe the most famous grizzly, in the world.

=== Endangered species list ===
In 2017, United States Fish and Wildlife Service officials removed grizzly bears outside the Yellowstone Park and the Grand Teton National Park in Wyoming, Montana, and Idaho from the endangered species list, also known as the Greater Yellowstone Ecosystem. On May 23, 2018, a Wyoming wildlife commission voted unanimously on an approval for a grizzly bear hunt. The hunt would have been the first in the state in over forty years and sanctioned the killing of up to 22 bears. This would have occurred just one year after bears were removed from the endangered species list. For the 2018 hunting season, Montana had decided against a hunt. Idaho, with the fewest grizzlies, decided to allow hunting of only one bear. Wyoming planned for the hunting of up to 22 bears. No hunting was to be allowed inside the national parks or the connecting road between them. Hunters in the area said they would target 399 because she is the biggest trophy, the most famous. Grizzly 399 lives in the Grand Teton National Park part of the year, which is near Yellowstone Park. However, she also dens in the national forest which is not part of any park. Big game hunting is allowed there, so that is where likely where hunters would have targeted her.

In July 2018, Mangelsen helped fuel a movement that five women quickly organized called "Shoot'em With A Camera—Not A Gun." The object was to enlist people against trophy hunting to join the lottery for Wyoming's bear hunting licenses. The plan was to win a tag and keep it, so it would not be used to kill a bear. In Wyoming, approximately 7,000 people applied for bear tags. This list included Mangelsen and Jane Goodall, as well as many other well known conservationists. In May 2018, the Wyoming Game and Fish Department let a vote decide the number of grizzlies to be killed. The tally came to 22 grizzlies. Mangelsen has lived in Wyoming for over 40 years and has been actively involved in bear conservation in the state during that time. Additionally, both national parks generate more than $1 billion annually through tourism. The two highest animal generators are grizzlies and wolves. The amount generated by just those two apex predators eclipses what Wyoming spends on bear management by a vast amount.

In July 2018, Mangelsen learned he was positioned high enough on a hunting lottery to actually receive a hunting tag. The lottery is for hunting a grizzly bear in September through November. Mangelsen will be shooting the bruin with a camera, not a gun. Mangelsen is one of 7,000 people who could receive a tag. Then, in September just weeks before hunting season was to begin, a federal judge in Montana restored protection to all of the bears in the Greater Yellowstone Ecosystem. The judge ruled that the United States Fish and Wildlife Service officials were "arbitrary and capricious" when they removed protection from the bears under the Endangered Species Act.

== Recognition ==
=== Photography awards ===
In 1994 and 2000 Mangelsen won the British Broadcasting Corporation’s Wildlife Photographer of the Year Award. The North American Nature Photography Association honored him as the Outstanding Nature Photographer of the Year.

In 2005 he was honored as one of the 100 Most Important People in Photography by American Photo magazine. His image Polar Dance was chosen as the International League of Conservation Photographers as one of the 40 Most Important Nature Photographs of All Time.

Mangelsen was selected as one of the 40 Most Influential Nature Photographers by Outdoor Photography: He was also selected as the 2011 Conservation Photographer of the Year by Nature's Best Photography, thus his work was placed in the permanent collection at the Smithsonian's National Museum of Natural History in Washington, D.C.

Mangelsen was chosen as a Loweprofessional. In 2012, his work was displayed on the walls of the Smithsonian.

In 2012, at the Windland Smith Rice International Awards Ceremony, Mangelsen won the Conservation Photographer of the Year Award at the Windland Smith Rice International Awards Exhibition. In 2012, he was awarded the Conservation Photographer of the Year.

In 2018, the Sierra Club honored him with the Ansel Adams Award for Conservation Photography. The award honors superb photography which is used to benefit conservation.

In 2019, the National Parks Conservation Association honored him with the Robin W. Winks Award for Enhancing Public Understanding of National Parks. The award recognizes an individual or organization that has effectively communicated the values of the National Park System to the American public.

=== Book awards ===
In 2014, he was awarded the Design and Production Award for Trade Books Illustrated for Yellowstone Wildlife: Ecology and Natural History of the Greater Yellowstone Ecosystem by Paul A. Johnsgard and illustrated by Thomas D. Mangelsen. In 2015, Mangelsen was awarded the National Outdoor Book Award: Design & Artistic Merit for The Last Great Wild Places.

His book Grizzlies of Pilgrim Creek, An Intimate Portrait of 399, The Most Famous Bear of Greater Yellowstone won several awards. In 2015, the Los Angeles Times recognized it as a "Mesmerizing Coffee Table Title"; in 2016 it received the Foreword Indies Book Award, a High Plains Book Award, and the Outdoor Writers Association of America, Excellence in Craft Contest.

=== Honors ===
Awarded one of Dr. Jane Goodall's Heroes of the Animal Planet, he was profiled in the corresponding television series. Doane College awarded him an honorary doctorate. In 2002, he was awarded with an Honorary Fellowship from The Royal Photographic Society. He was also awarded Nikon's "Legend Behind the Lens" recognition.

== Exhibitions ==
- An exhibit of his photographs entitled Vital Signs: Images of Biodiversity, opened at the San Diego Natural History Museum in 1997; the exhibit also traveled to other museums in the United States and Canada

General exhibits have been shown at these museums:

- Natural History Museum, London
- Joslyn Art Museum in Omaha, Nebraska
- "A Life in the Wild", National Museum of Wildlife Art in Jackson, Wyoming, October 20, 2018, to May 5, 2019
- San Diego Natural History Museum
- King Sportsman Edge Gallery in New York City

== Works ==
=== Bibliography ===
- Images of Nature: The Photographs of Thomas D. Mangelsen. By Charles Craighead and illustrated by Thomas D. Mangelsen. (1989)
- Polar Dance: Born of the North Wind. By Fred Bruemmer and illustrated by Thomas D. Mangelsen. (1997)
- Spirit of the Rockies: The Mountain Lions of Jackson Hole. By Cara Blessley Lowe and illustrated by Thomas D. Mangelsen. (2000)
- The Natural World. (Foreword by Jane Goodall). (2007)
- The Last Great Wild Places: Forty Years of Wildlife Photography. Written by Todd Wilkinson, foreword by Jane Goodall, and illustrated by Thomas D. Mangelsen. (2014)
- Grizzlies of Pilgrim Creek. Written by Todd Wilkinson and illustrated by Thomas D. Mangelsen. (2015)

=== Filmography ===
- Thomas D. Mangelsen. Filmmaker/Associate Producer/Photography. Flight of the Whooping Crane. 1984. (National Geographic Emmy nominated TV special.)
- Thomas D. Mangelsen. Producer/Director/Cinematographer. Cranes of the Grey Wind. 1990. (PBS/Nature, BBC film.)Source:

== See also ==
- Paul Nicklen
