= Toshiji =

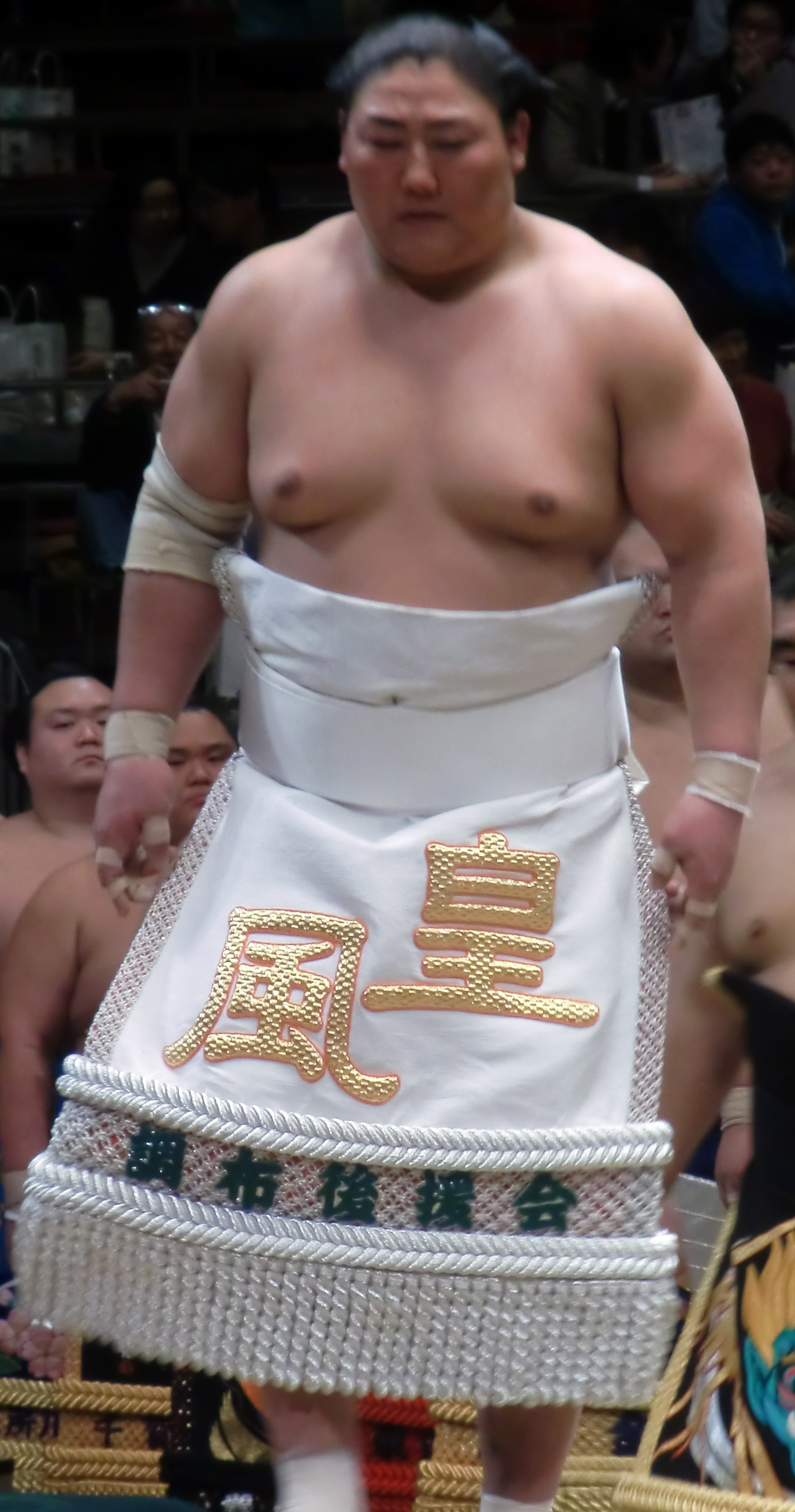
- Toshiji Kimikaze, Japanese sumo wrestler
- Pronunciation: toɕidʑi (IPA)
- Gender: Male

Origin
- Origin: Japanese
- Meaning: Different meanings depending on the kanji used

Other names
- Alternative spelling: Tosizi (Kunrei-shiki) Tosizi (Nihon-shiki) Toshiji (Hepburn)

Toshiji is a masculine Japanese given name.

== Written forms ==
Toshiji can be written using different combinations of kanji characters. Some examples:

- 敏次, "agile, next"
- 敏二, "agile, two"
- 敏治, "agile, to manage/cure"
- 敏児, "agile, child"
- 敏爾, "agile, you"
- 敏慈, "agile, mercy"
- 敏司, "agile, administer"
- 俊次, "talented, next"
- 俊二, "talented, two"
- 俊治, "talented, to manage/cure"
- 俊児, "talented, child"
- 俊爾, "talented, you"
- 俊慈, "talented, mercy"
- 俊司, "talented, administer"
- 利次, "benefit, next"
- 利二, "benefit, two"
- 利治, "benefit, to manage/cure"
- 利児, "benefit, child"
- 利爾, "benefit, you"
- 利司, "benefit, administer"
- 年次, "year, next"
- 年二, "year, two"
- 寿次, "long life, next"
- 寿二, "long life, two"

The name can also be written in hiragana としじ or katakana トシジ.

== Notable people with the name ==
- Toshiji Eda (江田 利児, born 1937), Japanese rower
- Toshiji Fukuda (福田 俊司, born 1948), Japanese photographer
- Toshiji Kimikaze (皇風 俊司, born 1986), real name Toshiji Naoe (直江 俊司), Japanese sumo wrestler
