= Andy Biggs (photographer) =

American wildlife photographer

- Born: 1969 (age 56–57); Houston, Texas, U.S.
- Occupation: Wildlife photography
- Website: AndyBiggs.com

Andy Biggs (born 1969 in Houston) is an American wildlife photographer. He is best known for his black and white safari photography of the wildlife and landscapes of Africa.

== Early life ==
He graduated from The University of Texas in Austin.

== Career ==
Biggs is an avid adventurer, conservationist, teacher, and outdoor photographer whose photography celebrates the African landscape and its rich wildlife, people, and culture. With a deep respect and understanding for African wildlife, Andy unfolds the world of the Serengeti, the Okavango Delta and other wildlife-rich destinations onto our doorstep with striking emotional depth. His photographic safaris allow the traveler to not only enhance their understanding of photography, lighting, and wildlife, but to develop a lifelong admiration for Africa 's beauty and culture.

Andy launched Gura Gear in 2008, in an attempt to deliver lightweight camera bags to the market. Andy was looking for a lightweight camera bag to hold all of his photographic gear, and there was nothing desirable on the market that suited his needs. After spending 2 years with many prototypes, the Gura Gear Kiboko bag was born.

Biggs also owns a travel company, and is a private safari guide in the African countries of Kenya, Tanzania, Botswana, Namibia, South Africa, Rwanda, Uganda and Zimbabwe.

== Awards ==
- In 2008, Banana Republic used thirteen of Andy's photographs as the cornerstone of their Urban Safari campaign, and his images were seen in all 750 stores around the globe, as well as in their billboards, catalogs and annual report.
- Winner of the BBC Wildlife Photographer of the Year in the 'Wild Places' category in 2008.
- First place in the Wild Places category of Wildlife Photographer of the Year. His photograph, Skeleton Coast of Namibia, shows the Skeleton Coast of Namibia as seen from an airplane. Skeleton Coast was his second winning entry in the annual competition. This and other winning photographs were on display at the Natural History Museum in London through spring of 2009.
