= WPY =

WPY may refer to:

- White Pass and Yukon Route, Canada–US railway (1900–1982)
- Wildlife Photographer of the Year, a competition founded in 1964
