= List of bird photography award winners =

Wildlife Photographer of the Year (WPY) is an annual international wildlife photography competition staged by the Natural History Museum in London, England. It has been described as the most prestigious wildlife photography award in the world. The Bird Category competition is a highly competitive event in bird photography.

— Major press coverage: BBC, CNN, Forbes, USA Today, and National Geographic

Bird Photographer of the Year (BPOY) is known as a prestigious and leading global competition, which celebrates the avian beauty and diversity and the world's best bird photography.

— Major press coverage: BBC, CNN, Forbes, The Times, CBS News, The Guardian, BBC Wildlife Magazine, Amateur Photographers, and Smithsonian Magazine

The Audubon Photography Awards is referred to as the leading bird photography competition in North America. It is organized by National Audubon Society.

— Major press coverage: BBC, Forbes, TimeOut, PetaPixel, and CNN

National Wildlife Photo Contest is a prestigious photo contest that celebrates wildlife, habitats and the natural world, with an emphasis on conservation and ethical photography honoring the well-being of animals in the wild. It is organized by National Wildlife Federation.

— Major press coverage: USA Today

== Winners Of Top Bird Photography Awards ==
Year	Wildlife Photographer of the Year Bird Category Winners	Bird Photographer of the Year Grand Prize Winners	Audubon Photography Awards Grand Prize Winners	National Wildlife Photo Contest Bird Category Winners
2026	Isak Pretorius	Henley Spiers	Jacqueline Burke	
2025	Qingrong Yang	Liron Gertsman	Felipe Esteban Toledo Alarcon Liron Gertsman	Jack Zhi
2024	Jack Zhi	Patricia Homonylo	Mathew Malwitz	Joshua Galicki
2023	Hadrien Lalagüe	Jack Zhi	Liron Gertsman	Suliman Alatiqi
2022	Nick Kanakis	Rock Ptarmigan	Jack Zhi	Harry Collins
2021	Shane Kalyn	Alejandro Prieto	Carolina Fraser	Melissa Cormican
2020	Jose Luis Ruiz Jiménez	Majed Alza’abi	Joanna Lentini	Ron Magill
2019	Audun Rikardsen	Caron Steele	Kathrin Swoboda	Kirk Geisler
2018	Thomas P Peschak	Pedro Jarque Krebs	Steve Mattheis	Manoj Shah
2017	Gerry Pearce	Alejandro Prieto Rojas	Deborah Albert	David Turko
2016	Ganesh H Shankar	Andrew Parkinson	Bonnie Block	
2015	Amir Ben-Dov		Melissa Groo	Wink Gaines
2014	Bence Máté			Antonio Busiello
2013	Isak Pretorius		Michael Libbe	
2012	Paul Nicklen		Alice Cahill	Nick Dunlop
2011	Steve Mills		Carol Graham Fryer	Antonio Busiello
2010	Arto Juvonen			Antonio Busiello
2009	Rob Palmer		Rob Palmer	
2008	Antoni Kasprzak			
2007	Louis-Marie Préau			
2006	Vincent Munier			
2005	Manuel Presti			
2004	Jan Vermeer			
2003	Nick Oliver			
2002	Bernd Zoller			
2001	Louis-Marie Préau			
2000	Tim Fitzharris			
1999	Uwe Walz			
1998	Kari Reponen			
1997	Torsten Brehm			
1996	Derrick Hamrick			
1995	Roger Wilmhurst			
1994	Mary Ann McDonald			
1993	Pål Hermansen			
1992	Niall Benvie			
1991	Benjamin Pontinen			
