= Michel Roggo =

Swiss underwater photographer (born 1951)

Michel Roggo (born September 13, 1951, in Fribourg/Switzerland) is a Swiss underwater photographer who has worked as a wildlife photographer since 1987. He is a member of the ILCP (International League of Conservation Photographers) and has received multiple awards for many of his freshwater photos and publications.

== Biography ==
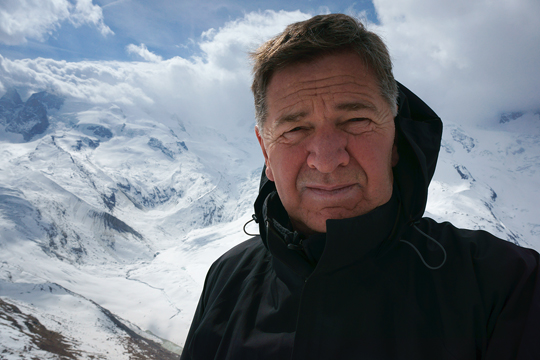
Michel Roggo

Michel Roggo started taking pictures as a hobby at the age of 30. After studying geology, he worked as teacher in the secondary school of Düdingen. Foreign trips followed. In Alaska he observed the migration of salmon for the first time. This fascinated him so much that he decided to photograph the salmon spawning run. He refined his recording technique during annually recurring stays. He took underwater pictures without diving himself. In 2008 he received the Fribourg Culture Award for his photographic work.

In 2010 Roggo began his global project after 25 years of experience with fresh water, animal, plant and underwater landscape photography and over 100 trips: to capture 40 fresh water worldwide, the Freshwater Project.

== Work ==
=== Publications (selection) ===
- 3 Seen=300,000. (with co-author Etienne Francey) Werd & Weber Verlag, Thun 2019.
- Aqua:wasser.eau.water. Werd & Weber Verlag, Thun 2017.
- Wasser.schweiz=Water.switzerland=Eau.suisse. Werd & Weber Verlag, Thun 2014
- With Pierre-Pascal Rossi (Text): Eau douce: Itinéraire d'un pêcheur d'images. Slatkine, Genf 2008.
- Süsswasser. Mit den Augen eines Bilderfischers. Aus dem Französischen übers. von Hubertus von Gemmingen. Paulusverlag, Freiburg 2008.
- Poissons suisse=Fischwelt Schweiz=Pesci svizzeri. (+ manual). DVD. WWF Switzerland, Zürich 2004
- Die Fische der Schweiz = Les poissons de Suisse = I pesci della Svizzera. WWF, o. O. 2003.
- With Anton Bertschy(Text): Das Senseland. Hrsg. vom Deutschfreiburger Heimatkundeverein. Paulusverlag, Freiburg i. Üe. 2003
- With Markus Hostmann, Andreas Knutti (Text): Befreite Wasser. Entdeckungsreisen in revitalisierte Flusslandschaften der Schweiz. Hrsg. vom WWF/Bundesamt für Wasser und Geologie BWG. Rotpunktverlag, Zürich 2002.
- With Anton Schwartz: Urlandschaften. Hrsg. v. Deutschfreiburger Heimatkundeverein. Paulusverlag, Freiburg i. Üe. 2001.
- Leben am Fluss. Hrsg. von Pro Natura. Paulusverlag, Freiburg i. Üe. 1998.
- With Stefan Stöcklin (Text): Fischperspektiven. Hrsg. v. Amt für Wald und Natur, Fischereiinspektorat. Fischereininspektorat des Kantons Bern, Bern [1994].

=== Exhibitions (selection) ===
- 3 Seen. With Etienne Francey. Museum Murten, 16. Juni – 6. Oktober 2019
- Aqua. Zoologisches Museum der Universität Zürich, 23. Juli 2019 – 02. Februar 2020
- AQUA. Naturhistorisches Museum Basel, 29. März 2019 – 30. Juni 2019
- Aqua. Naturhistorisches Museum Freiburg, 10. Juni 2017 – 28. Januar 2018
- Wasserwelten. Naturhistorisches Museum Freiburg, 22. Mai – 03. Oktober 2015

=== Prizes and awards (selection) ===
- Wildlife Photographer of the Year (Liste): 2019 Plants and Fungi (cf. Full List, Nr. 3057) and awarded image
- Wildlife Photographer of the Year (Liste): 2017 Plants and Fungi (cf. Full List, Nr. 2884) and awarded image and article by Paul Teasdale: Wildlife Photographer of the Year: underwater photographers in the field. In: Natural History Museum (London). December 2017

=== Literature (selection) ===
- Didier Martenet: La deuxième vie du photographe d'eau douce. In: L'illustré, 27. September 2019.
- Susanne Rothenbacher: Unter uns ein Paradies. In: Schweizer Familie, 28/2019, S. 25, 27, 29, 31, 33.
- Carole Schneuwly: «Ich suche das Bild, nicht den Kick». In: Freiburger Nachrichten, 31. Oktober 2014.
- Carole Schneuwly: «Ich suche das Bild, nicht den Kick». In: Berner Zeitung, 1. November 2014
- Susanne Rothenbacher: Reise ins Herz des Eises. In: Schweizer Familie, 45/2013, S. 28–42.
