= Frank Deschandol =

French wildlife photographer

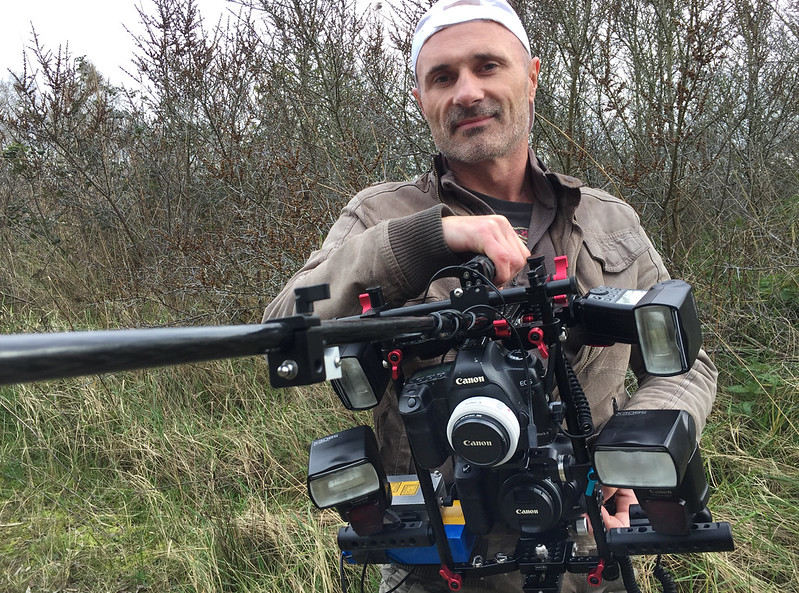
- Frank Deschandol in 2023
- Born: 20 December 1971 (age 54); Sainte-Adresse, France
- Occupation: Wildlife photographer

Frank Deschandol (born 20 December 1971) is a French wildlife photographer. He specialises in macro and nature photography, particularly of insects, spiders, reptiles and other small fauna.

In 2020, Deschandol won the Wildlife Photographer of the Year award in the Invertebrates category.

== Early life ==
Deschandol was born in Sainte-Adresse, in the Normandy region of France, and is based in Le Havre.

== Career ==
Initially interested in birds, Deschandol progressively turned his attention to reptiles, spiders and insects and developed a long-term specialisation in macro photography. He has worked in both tropical forests and temperate habitats.

Science and nature outlets describe his approach as based on observing animals in their natural environment, emphasising patience and non-intrusive field practice.

He has also photographed rare or unusual wildlife, including a blue colour morph of Hyla meridionalis documented in the Dordogne region.

== Awards ==
In 2020, Deschandol won the Invertebrates category of the Wildlife Photographer of the Year competition for A Tale of Two Wasps, a photograph taken in the Seine estuary showing a cuckoo wasp approaching the nest of a sand wasp.

In 2023, he received an award in the “Other Animals” category at the China Wildlife Image and Video Competition, with his winning image published on the competition's official website.

Press coverage described him as “among the best wildlife photographers in the world” and highlighted the international distinctions he had accumulated.

== Exhibitions and publications ==
In 2021, Deschandol presented 26 large-format prints in the outdoor exhibition Rencontres dans l’Ouest australien, part of the “Escale australienne” cultural programme in Le Havre.

In 2025, he self-published LIVES, a book compiling ten years of his photographic work.
