= Michel d'Oultremont =

Belgian nature photographer

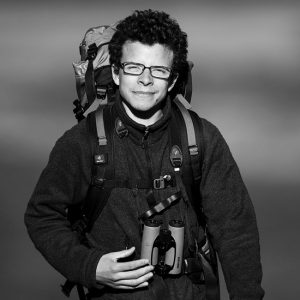
- Born: 8 January 1992 (age 34); Braine-l'Alleud
- Occupation: Nature photographer
- Website: micheldoultremont.com

Signature
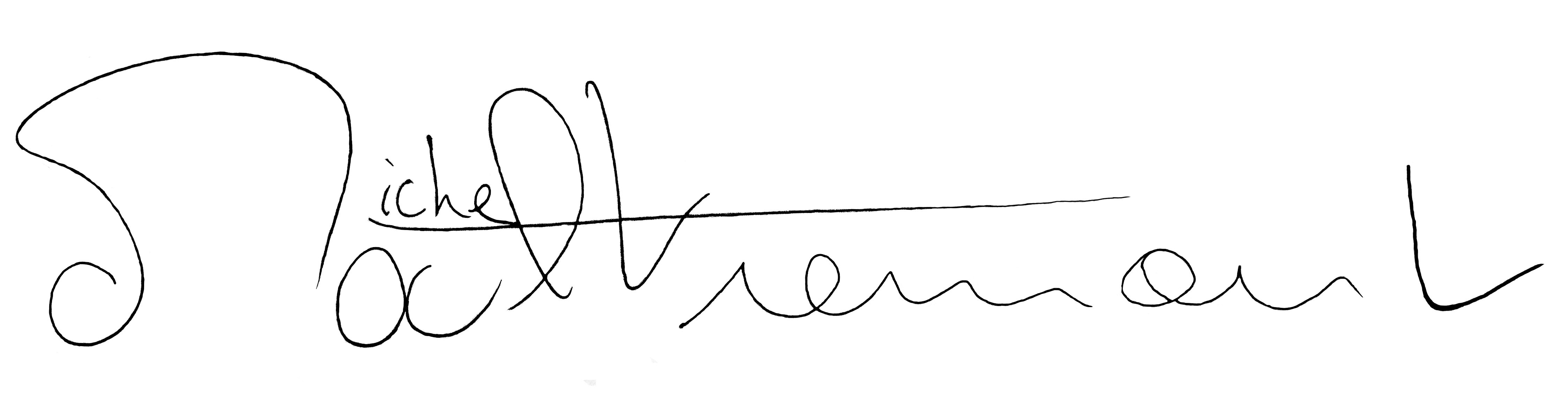

Michel d'Oultremont (born 8 January 1992) is a Belgian nature photographer. Michel d'Oultremont is a former student of INRACI in Brussels.

== Awards ==
- 2014 : Fritz Polking Award
- 2014 : Rising Star Award of the Wildlife Photographer Of The Year
- 2018 : Rising Star Award of the Wildlife Photographer Of The Year

== Publications ==
- Hokkaido, auto-edited, 2019
- Yellowstone, auto-edited
- Rencontres, Escourbiac, ISBN 978-2-9601908-0-9
