= Tim Laman =

American ornithologist, wildlife photojournalist and filmmaker

Timothy G. Laman is an American ornithologist, wildlife photojournalist and filmmaker. He is notable for documenting all the species of bird-of-paradise in their native habitat during research expeditions with colleague Edwin Scholes of the Cornell Lab of Ornithology. His bird-of-paradise work was first published in a 2007 article about them for National Geographic. In 2016, he won the top prize in the BBC Wildlife Photographer of the Year Awards, for his image of an orangutan climbing a tree to feed on figs.

== Early life ==
Laman was born in Tokyo, Japan in 1961 to American parents originally from Michigan who spent their careers working as protestant missionaries in Japan. He spent most of his childhood in Japan before attending college in the United States. His early education included Japanese public school, home schooling by his mother, American schools on military bases in Japan, and finally graduating from Canadian Academy, an international school in Kobe, Japan. Laman received his a B.S in biology from Hope College in Holland, Michigan in 1983. Laman graduated with a Ph.D. in biology from Harvard University in 1994.

== Career ==
Laman first traveled to the rainforests of Borneo in 1987. Since that trip, the Asia-Pacific region has been a major focus for his photography and research. He initially pursued a doctoral program in neuroscience and animal behavior at Harvard University. Later he decided to take a year off from his studies and joined biologist and ecologist Mark Leighton as a field assistant.

Upon his return to Cambridge, he transferred to the Department of Organismic and Evolutionary Biology and completed his doctorate in 1994. His pioneering research in Borneo’s rainforest canopy for his doctoral thesis was featured in his first National Geographic article in 1997, which he both wrote and photographed. He continued documenting little-known and endangered wildlife as a regular contributor to National Geographic, publishing 23 feature stories to date. In addition, Laman has published more than a dozen scientific articles on rainforest ecology and birdlife as a research associate in Harvard University's Ornithology Department in the Museum of Comparative Zoology.

== Photography ==
Laman published his first article in National Geographic magazine in 1997, and has been a regular contributor to the magazine ever since. He has published 23 feature stories as photographer, and authored four of those as well. Laman's photography has focused on capturing images and videos of subjects that were difficult to document, such as the Sunda flying lemur and other gliding animals in Borneo, displaying birds-of-paradise and critically endangered bird species including the Nuku Hiva pigeon and the Visayan wrinkled hornbill of the Philippines. He focused on documenting endangered and at-risk animals in order to promote awareness and encourage conservation efforts.

Building on his career in still photography, Laman began filming for natural history documentary films around 2009, and has been a cinematographer for numerous films, including the BBC's "Planet Earth II", Netflix's "Our Planet - Jungles", Netflix's "Dancing with the Birds", BBC's "Seven Worlds - One Planet", Netflix's "David Attenborough: A Life on Planet Earth", and BBC's "Life in Color with David Attenborough".

== Awards ==
Laman has received many accolades and awards, including the “Outstanding Nature Photographer” award in 2009 from the North American Nature Photography Association, their highest honor. Twenty-two of his images have won recognition in the Natural History Museum's Wildlife Photographer of the Year awards. In 2016, he was named their Wildlife Photographer of the Year. He won several prizes in Nature’s Best International Photography awards, including first place in the Underwater category.

== Birds of Paradise: Revealing The World's Most Extraordinary Birds ==
Laman completed the first comprehensive photographic coverage of the Birds of Paradise. He collaborated with ornithologist Edwin Scholes on this series. They inhabit rugged and remote regions where they pose an extreme challenge to locate and photograph in their dense rainforest homes in New Guinea. Laman and Scholes spent over 18 months doing fieldwork in the New Guinea region over an eight-year period with support from the Cornell Lab of Ornithology, Conservation International and the National Geographic Expeditions Council. Their book, Birds of Paradise: Revealing The World's Most Extraordinary Birds, was published by National Geographic Books in 2012. The work was featured in a National Geographic Channel documentary, a National Geographic article in December 2012 and in a traveling educational museum exhibition. The goal of the book and subsequent features was to protect these magnificent birds and New Guinea’s biodiverse rainforests.

Laman has led many expeditions as a National Geographic Expert with Lindblad Expeditions and National Geographic Expeditions. He teaches photography and educates participants on the local wildlife and natural history. He led tours in remote locations around the world, including the Galapagos, Antarctica, South Georgia, Botswana and Rwanda. He later worked for Wildlife Of The World By Private Jet, which includes diving the Maldives.

Laman's tree-climbing exploits and doctoral research feature in Chapter 7 of Mike Shanahan's 2016 book Ladders to Heaven: How fig trees shaped our history, fed our imaginations and can enrich our future, republished in North America as Gods, Wasps and Stranglers (US).
