= Antonio Busiello =

Italian American photographer

- Born: Naples, Italy
- Occupations: Photographer; Author
- Awards: Royal Photographic Society; BBC Wildlife Photographer of the Year; Environmental Photographer of the Year; National Geographic photo contest; The Center for Fine Art Photography Award
- Website: antoniobusiello.com

Antonio Busiello is an Italian American photographer.

== Life and work ==
A native of Italy, Busiello studied anthropology at the University of Naples. He lived in Central America for many years before moving to California and then to London.

In 2010 he shot "Storm Gathering", a photograph that captured first prize in the BBC Wildlife Photographer of the Year competition in the black and white category. Later that same image was included in the "Best Wildlife Images of the Last 50 years", published by London's Natural History Museum in 2015.

Busiello has created numerous photographic essays. These include, among others, Pride from Atacama, Camp of Shame or The Cullatore", the opening photograph in his anthropological project about the Festival of the Lilies in Italy, won the gold medal from the Royal Photographic Society.

In 2015 the World Wildlife Fund hired him to shoot its global campaign.

One year later his photograph "Sinking Venice" was chosen as part of the CIWEM – Environmental Photographer of the Year exhibition held at the Royal Geographical Society in London. In the same year Busiello started freelancing for the Italian magazine DOVE, where his first assignments focus on Naples, his hometown.

Busiello's work has been exhibited in museums, including the Smithsonian Museum of Natural History in Washington, DC and London's Natural History Museum. His photographs have appeared in National Geographic, World Wildlife Fund, Time, Discovery Channel, BBC Wildlife, Huffington Post and the Washington Post. A number of his images are part of the permanent exhibition at the National Park Visitor Center in Ventura, California, including the image "Anacapa Arch".

== Awards ==
- 2018: Atkins Ciwem Environmental photographer of the Year Exhibition
- 2016: Atkins Ciwem Environmental photographer of the Year Exhibition.
- 2014: Atkins Ciwem Environmental photographer of the Year Exhibition
- 2013: Royal Photographic Society – GOLD MEDAL
- 2011: CIWEM Environmental Photographer of the Year
- 2011: BBC Wildlife Photographer of the Year
- 2010: BBC Wildlife Photographer of the Year
- 2010: National Geographic Society Photo Contest
