= Jan Töve =

Swedish photographer, writer and lecturer

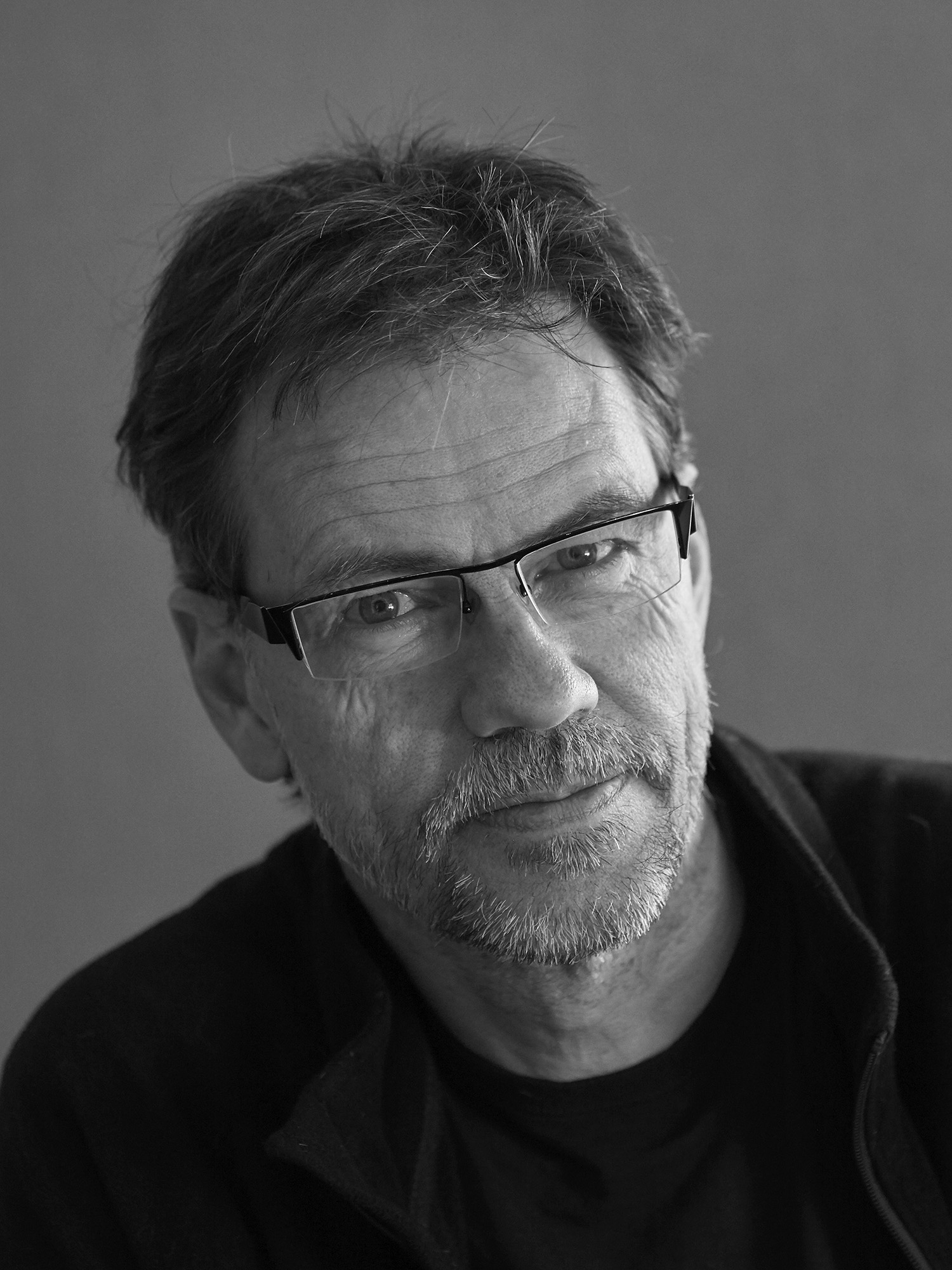
- Born: May 14, 1958 (age 67); Töve, Sweden
- Occupation: Photographer
- Website: jantove.com

Jan Töve (born May 14, 1958) is a Swedish landscape photographer, writer and lecturer.

Töve has won several awards in the Wildlife Photographer of the Year competition, owned by BBC Wildlife and The Natural History Museum, and beside his publicist's work shot a documentary for the Swedish State Television.

In 1995 he was awarded the title Årets nordiska naturfotograf (Nordic Photographer of the Year) by the Swedish photography magazine Foto. Several years later he was also awarded the Årets naturfotograf 2003 (Nature Photographer of the Year, 2003) by the Swedish Environmental Protection Agency. His first book, Speglingar (Reflections), was published in 1996 and depicts various seasonal changes in the nature.

Töve seeks to depict the border country between nature, people and society, as expressed in his latest books, Riverside (2007), Silent Landscape (2012), Faraway Nearby (Hatje Cantz 2017), and Night Light (self-published, 2020).

== Bibliography ==
- Speglingar. 1996 ISBN 91-630-4657-1
- Bortom redan. 2001 ISBN 91-973011-5-9
- Riverside Viskan. 2007 ISBN 978-91-976852-0-7
- Silent Landscape. 2012 ISBN 978-91-976852-7-6
- Faraway Nearby. 2017 ISBN 978-3-7757-4358-7
- Night Light. 2020 ISBN 978-91-519-3805-9

== Bibliography (photography) ==
- Skogaryd – en skogshistoria. 1999 ISBN 91-630-7873-2
- Hornborgasjön. 2002 ISBN 91-620-1219-3
- Kunskap om skogens historia. 2003 ISBN 91-631-4278-3
- Fässingen: Från Borås och de sju häraderna. 2003 ISSN 0347-2477
- Bygden runt sjön. 2004 ISBN 91-631-6044-7
- Vänerhavet. 2005 ISBN 91-975848-0-0
- De gamle och skogen – kulturarvet i skogslandskapet. 2006 ISBN 91-631-8214-9
- Västerut: natur mellan Vinga och Vättern. 2006 ISBN 91-88238-58-X
- Matsmart. 2008 ISBN 9789188238856
- Röster från skogen. 2010 ISBN 9789185815432
- Änglagårdsbygd. 2011 ISBN 9789163397936
- Skogssällskapet – en växande historia 1912–2012. 2012 ISBN 9789163714849
- Bohuskusten. 2018 ISBN 978-91-88435-39-2
