= Pete Oxford =

British photographer

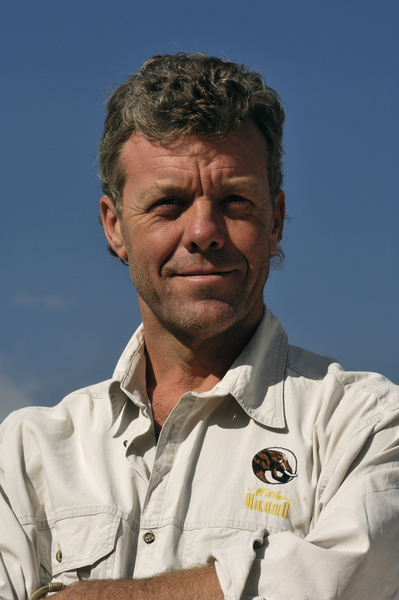
- Citizenship: British
- Occupation: Photographer
- Website: http://peteoxford.com/

Pete Oxford is a British conservation photographer based in Cape Town, South Africa, after living in Quito, Ecuador for several years. Originally trained as a marine biologist, he and his wife, South African Reneé Bish, now work as a professional photographic team focusing primarily on wildlife and indigenous cultures.

== Career ==
Oxford is a founding fellow of the International League of Conservation Photographers and was a co-founder of the Galapagos Naturalist Guide's Association (AGIPA) in 1987. In 1992, he became a Fellow of the Royal Geographical Society. He is an ambassador for Gitzo Inspires and works closely with the Orianne Society based in the United States and the MarAlliance for marine conservation.

Oxford and Bish are co-founders and operators of Pete Oxford Expeditions, leading photographic tours with a focus on responsible travel.

Oxford has 10 images featured in the BBC Wildlife Photographer of the Year competition. He is known as the 15th most active photographer in the history of the awards. Oxford's images have appeared in many publications such as National Geographic Magazine. His photos have also been featured in BBC Wildlife, Time Magazine, International Wildlife, WWF, Smithsonian, GEO, Nature's Best, Terre Sauvage, Outdoor Photography Magazine, The Economist, The Guardian, Geographical, Ranger Rick, and Airone.

== Awards ==
- In 2015, Oxford was awarded the IUCN 'Man in Nature' Photographic Prize at the Terre Sauvage Nature Image Awards Exhibition for his series documenting Whale Sharks.
- In 2014, Oxford received the title of Ecuadorian Photojournalist of the Year for his article "Yasuní, una visión personal" in Revisita Mundo Diners.
- In 2015, Oxford was the winner of the Ranger Rick Photographer of the Year Award, presented by the National Wildlife Federation.
- In 2014, Oxford was awarded the IUCN/Terre Sauvage Mevita Grant for his photographic series documenting elephant relocation in Africa.
- In 2010, Oxford was recognized as one of the top 40 Most Influential Nature Photographers in the world by Outdoor Photography Magazine.

== Books ==
Undiscovered Guyana (WWF, 2016) Foreword by President of Guyana David A. Granger

Yasuní, Tiputini and the Web of Life (Ingwe Press, 2012) Foreword by E.O. Wilson

The Origin of the Waorani (Quito Ministerio del Ambiento, 2011)

Galapagos Wildlife (Bradt Travel Guides Ltd., 2011)

Rupununi Rediscovering a Lost World (Earth in Focus Editions, 2010) Foreword by HRH Prince Charles

Spirit of the Huaorani: An Amazon people of the Yasuní region of Ecuador (Imagine Publishing Inc., 2009) Foreword by Trudie Styler & Sting

Galapagos: Both Sides of the Coin (Enfoque Ediciones, 2009) Foreword by HRH Prince Philip

Cunsi Pindo: La Señora de los Monos (Simbioe, 2007)

Ecuador: Land of Frogs (FHGO, 2004)

Ecuador (Dinediciones, 2004)

Chagras: Ecuador’s Andean Cowboys (Dinediciones, 2004)

Galapagos: The Untamed Isles (Ediciones Libri Mundi Enrique Grosse-Luemern, 2001)

Amazon Images: A portfolio of impressions from the Ecuadorian Amazon (Dinediciones, 1995)

== Articles ==
Amazing Pictures Reveal Life Inside An Amazon Tribe (LADbible, UK, January 2017)

Incredible photos of Ecuadorian tribe, whose lifestyle is threatened by oil exploration (Metro, UK, January 2017)

Amazing photos show 2,200-pound rhino in helicopter airlift above African jungle in relocation to protect them from poachers (Daily Mirror, UK, January 2017)

Frontiers: A Special Breed (American Cowboy Magazine, 2016)

Whale Sharks (SEVENSEAS Travel Magazine, Issue 9, February 2016)

Buceando con tiburones ballena (Mundo Diners, March 2016)

Nagas, los últimos cazadores de cabezas (Mundo Diners, October 2015)

Elephant Rescue: A roving herd in Zimbabwe puts human ingenuity to the test (National Wildlife Federation, September 2015)

View from the Crater’s Rim (Galapagos Matters, Autumn/Winter 2015)

These Are The Measures We Need To Take To Make Sure Elephants Are Safe (Huffington Post, 2015)

Yasuní, Una Visión Personal (Mundo Diners, August 2013)

Gorgeous Brunette and Stunning Blonde Run Wild in Marataba (Africa Geographic, February 2013)

Ecuador’s Yasuni National Park (NBC News, 2013)

Yasuni National Park seen through the lens of nature photog Pete Oxford (NBC News, 2013)

Stories from Marataba: Babe the Bushpig (Africa Geographic, November 2012)

Roaming with rhinos in South Africa (Wanderlust Travel Magazine, Issue 132, November 2012)

Touched by lightning (Africa Geographic, October 2012)

Iberian Lynx: Return of the Spanish Tiger (Discover Wildlife, March 2012)

Rediscover Rupununi In Southern Guyana, A Wildlife Haven (Huffington Post, September 2011)

Galapagos – in pictures (The Guardian, June 2011)

== See also ==
- Nature photography
- Wildlife photography
