= Brent Stirton =

Brent Stirton is a Senior Photographer for Getty Images, based in New York. His award-winning work has been widely recognized for its powerful depiction of issues related to conflict, health and environmental issues. Stirton specializes in documentary work and is known for his alternative approaches to photojournalism, including lighting portraiture in the field, and his prolific work rate. He travels an average of nine months of the year, working exclusively on commissioned assignment.

Stirton's work has appeared in Newsweek, National Geographic, CNN Traveler, The New York Times Magazine, The Washington Post Magazine, The Sunday Times Magazine, Le Monde 2, GQ, Geo and many other respected international titles. He also writes a blog for the Discovery Channel.

In working to visually interpret a story, Stirton often works in tandem with journalists from the world's leading publications. In the last two years he has worked regularly with CNN's Christiane Amanpour and Anderson Cooper on topics such as the tsunami disaster or religious fundamentalism, compiling still documentaries on tropical news events which are then voiced over and aired.

He works extensively on humanitarian issues including HIV/AIDS, environment, poverty, conflict and post-conflict recovery, and women's empowerment issues. Stirton works on a regular basis for the Global Business Coalition against AIDS and The Global Fund against AIDS, Tuberculosis and Malaria. He also works in the field for sustainability for The World Wide Fund for Nature, shooting global campaigns on the relationship between people and their environments. He also has worked for the Ford Foundation and the Clinton Foundation.

Stirton has won numerous awards and recognitions for his work, including seven awards from the World Press Photo Foundation; in 2007 he was cited as a "Hero of Photography" in PopPhoto Magazine. Stirton holds a degree in journalism from his native South Africa, where he began his career photographing apartheid issues.

== Awards ==
- 8 awards from World Press Photo Awards (2003-2014)
- 8 awards from Pictures of the Year POY
- Visa d'Or 2008 Visa Pour L'Image
- Overseas Press Club 2008 and 2013
- 6 Lucie Awards including International Photographer of the Year 2008
- National Magazine award for Photography - National Geographic Magazine
- Peabody Award - Human Rights Watch
- 3 x Wildlife photojournalist of the year Natural History Museum in London
- Environmental Photographer of the Year 2013 Society of Journalists USA
- Humane Society Award 2013
- United Nations Environment Award

== See also ==
- Dawie Groenewald, South African game farmer and convicted animal trafficker whose portrait appeared in Stirton's winning submission for the Natural History Museum's Wildlife Photojournalist Story award.
