= Norbert Wu =

Photographer, illustrator and writer

Norbert Wu (born 1961) is a photographer, illustrator and an author of more than seventeen books.

== Biography ==
From 1997 to 2000, Wu used to receive numerous artists and writers grants from the National Science Foundation and by 2000 was awarded Antarctica Service Medal from the United States for his research there. In 2004, he was named Outstanding Photographer of the Year by the North American Nature Photographers Association and made thirteen episodes about Antarctica which still airs on PBS. His book Antarctic Ice became the number one selection for both the National Science Teachers Association and the Children's Book Council and received Outstanding Science Trade Book for Students Award. Currently his works are exhibited at the American Museum of Natural History, the California and National Academy of Sciences and the National Museum of Wildlife Art.
