= Toshiji Fukuda =

Japanese photographer

- 福田俊司
- Born: 1948 (age 77–78)
- Occupation: photographer
- Known for: wildlife in Japan and Russia
- Notable work: with Russian Academy of Sciences
- Awards: ・Gerald Durrell Award for Endangered Species, Wildlife Photographer of the Year (2013) ・Best Backyards, Nature's Best Photography (2015) ・Crystal Compass, Russian Geographical Society (2025)

Toshiji Fukuda (福田俊司, Fukuda Toshiji; born 1948) is a Japanese photographer. He has been taking pictures of wildlife in Japan and Russia. He spends 100 to 150 days every year in the Far East of Russia, photographing the endangered species and other wildlife. He has been working with the Russian Academy of Sciences since 1991 and is an honorary member of the Academy's Far East branch of the Institute of Marine Biology. In 2025, Fukuda was a winner of the national Crystal Compass Award.

== Works ==
- Owls (フクロウ)
- Tales of Animals Told by a Mountain Hermit (仙人動物夜話)
- In pursuit of the wild (野生を追って)
- Wild animals in Nikko (日光の野生動物)
- Tracking the Amur tiger (ウスリートラを追って)
- The vast Siberian wilderness (シベリア大自然)
- A Journey Through the Northern Territories and the Kuril Islands (北方四島・千島列島紀行)
- The Diary of Siberian Animals (シベリア動物誌)
- Land of the Polar Bears (ホッキョクグマの王国)
- A Siberian Birdwatching Expedition (シベリア野鳥紀行)
- Pursuing the Amur Tiger, the King of Siberian Taiga (タイガの帝王 アムールトラを追う)
- Mandarin Ducks (鴛鴦・おしどり)
- BEARS (BEARS)

== Awards ==
- 2013 - Gerald Durrell Award for Endangered Species, Wildlife Photographer of the Year for Tiger untrapped
- 2015 - Nature's Best Backyards, The Nature's Best Photography Awards for Mandarin Ducks
- 2025 - Crystal Compass Award, Russian Geographical Society : All-Russian non-governmental organization for Nature Without Borders
