= Wildlife Photographer of the Year =

Annual slate of global wildlife photography awards

- Awarded for: Wildlife photography
- Country: United Kingdom
- Presented by: The Natural History Museum
- First award: 1964
- Currently held by: (France) Laurent Ballesta
- Website: http://www.nhm.ac.uk/wildphoto

Wildlife Photographer of the Year is an annual international wildlife photography competition staged by the Natural History Museum in London, England. There is an exhibition of the winning and commended images each year at the museum, which later tours around the world. The event has been described as the most prestigious wildlife photography competition in the world.

It was known as BG Wildlife Photographer of the Year from 1990 to 2003, and briefly as Shell Wildlife Photographer of the Year, Kodak Wildlife Photographer of the Year and Prudential Wildlife Photographer of the Year. The first competition was held in 1964, with three categories and around 600 entries. In 2008 the competition received over 32,000 entries from 3100 photographers in 82 countries.

A book of winning entries and runners-up has been published each year since 1992, with two books being published in 1994 (the first three volumes were published the year after the corresponding competitions were held). Early volumes have become quite collectable.

== Competition ==
A maximum of 25 images ranging from intimate animal portraits to atmospheric landscapes, ground-breaking photojournalism to innovative technique can be submitted once a year, in 12-17 permanent and alternate categories. Since 2003 the grand prize has been selected from among the winning images of the categories and has been awarded to a single image in adult and young competition too. The photographer aged 17 and under submitting the best image receives the title "The Young Wildlife Photographer of the Year", while the author of the best image over 17 years of age becomes "The Wildlife Photographer of the Year". (This award has never been won in adult category more than once.) The deadline of submission of the images is around late February, and the results become public in mid-October.

The winning images are selected from among approximately 50,000 entries received from nearly 100 countries in a three-round judging process. The awards ceremony takes place in the Natural History Museum in London. On the same day, the latest Wildlife Photographer of the Year portfolio, introducing the winning images, is published. Following the awards ceremony, the Wildlife Photographer of the Year exhibition opens in London before touring worldwide throughout the year, attracting more than 5 million visitors.

== Categories ==
Photographers can enter their images into a range of categories, whose criteria are mostly based on the subject matter of the images. There are also 3 categories for under 18's, and 3 special awards. The number and name of categories changes nearly every year. In each category a winning, runner-up and several highly commended images are usually chosen, although sometimes the judges will not choose a winner or runner up in a particular category if they deem the standard of entries not to be high enough. The categories in the 2016 competition were as follows:

- Mammals
- Birds
- Reptiles, Amphibians and Fishes
- Invertebrates
- Plants and Fungi
- Underwater
- On Land
- In the Skies
- Urban
- Detail
- Impressions
- Black and White
- Wildlife Photojournalist: Single Image
- Wildlife Photojournalist: Photo Story Award
- Rising Star Portfolio Award (ages 18 to 25)
- Wildlife Photographer Portfolio Award (ages 26 and over)

== 2009 controversy ==
The overall 2009 competition winner, José Luis Rodriguez, was stripped of his award and his £10,000 prize following allegations from rival Spanish photographers that his picture of an Iberian wolf leaping a cattle-pen in Ávila had been staged, using a captive animal to do so. The jury opened an investigation and ultimately disqualified it. He was also prohibited from entering the competition for life. It was, however, too late to remove the image from the accompanying book. There was much controversy as to the legitimacy of such claims, which, some say, were not backed by evidence but by skepticism from some experts and the jury itself.

== Grand title winners ==
Grand title winners of Wildlife Photographer of the Year from 1984
Year	Competition	Winner	Photograph	Country
2025	Wildlife Photographer of the Year 2025	Wim van den Heever	Ghost Town Visitor	South Africa
2024	Wildlife Photographer of the Year 2024	Shane Gross	The Swarm of Life	Canada
2023	Wildlife Photographer of the Year 2023	Laurent Ballesta	The Golden Horseshoe	France
2022	Wildlife Photographer of the Year 2022	Karine Aigner	The Big Buzz	(United States) USA
2021	Wildlife Photographer of the Year 2021	Laurent Ballesta	Creation	France
2020	Wildlife Photographer of the Year 2020	Sergey Gorshkov	The Embrace	Russia
2019	Wildlife Photographer of the Year 2019	Bao Yongqing	The Moment	China
2018	Wildlife Photographer of the Year 2018	Marsel van Oosten	The golden couple	Netherlands
2017	Wildlife Photographer of the Year 2017	Brent Stirton	Memorial to a species	South Africa
2016	Wildlife Photographer of the Year 2016	Tim Laman	Entwined lives	(United States) USA
2015	Wildlife Photographer of the Year 2015	Don Gutoski	A tale of two foxes	Canada
2014	Wildlife Photographer of the Year 2014	Michael "Nick" Nichols	The last great picture	(United States) USA
2013	Veolia Environnement Wildlife Photographer of the Year 2013	Greg du Toit	Essence of Elephants	South Africa
2012	Veolia Environnement Wildlife Photographer of the Year 2012	Paul Nicklen	Bubble-jetting Emperors	Canada
2011	Veolia Environnement Wildlife Photographer of the Year 2011	Daniel Beltrá	Still life in oil	Spain
2010	Veolia Environnement Wildlife Photographer of the Year 2010	Bence Máté	A marvel of ants	Hungary
2009	Veolia Environnement Wildlife Photographer of the Year 2009	José Luis Rodríguez (disqualified)	The storybook wolf	Spain
2008	Wildlife Photographer of the Year 2008	Steve Winter	Snowstorm leopard	(United States) USA
2007	Shell Wildlife Photographer of the Year 2007	Ben Osborne	Elephant creation	(United Kingdom) UK
2006	Shell Wildlife Photographer of the Year 2006	Göran Ehlmé	Beast of the sediment	Sweden
2005	Wildlife Photographer of the Year 2005	Manuel Presti	Sky chase	Italy
2004	Wildlife Photographer of the Year 2004	Doug Perrine	Bronze whalers charging a baitball	(United States) USA
2003	BG Wildlife Photographer of the Year 2003	Gerhard Schulz	Gorilla and boy	Germany
2002	BG Wildlife Photographer of the Year 2002	Angie Scott	African elephant family watching a grey heron	Kenya
2001	BG Wildlife Photographer of the Year 2001	Tobias Bernhard	Grey reef shark	Germany
2000	BG Wildlife Photographer of the Year 2000	Manoj Shah	Orang-utan and baby	Kenya / (United Kingdom) UK
1999	BG Wildlife Photographer of the Year 1999	Jamie Thom	Leopard with rising moon	South Africa
1998	BG Wildlife Photographer of the Year 1998	Manfred Danegger	Boxing hares	Germany
1997	BG Wildlife Photographer of the Year 1997	Tapani Räsänen	Common tern fishing	Finland
1996	BG Wildlife Photographer of the Year 1996	Jason Venus	Badger running	(United Kingdom) UK
1995	BG Wildlife Photographer of the Year 1995	Cherry Alexander	Blue iceberg, Antarctica	(United Kingdom) UK
1994	BG Wildlife Photographer of the Year 1994	Thomas D Mangelsen	Polar bear and arctic fox	(United States) USA
1993	BG Wildlife Photographer of the Year 1993	Martyn Colbeck	Bull elephant dusting	(United Kingdom) UK
1992	BG Wildlife Photographer of the Year 1992	André Bärtschi	Red and green macaws	Liechtenstein
1991	BG Wildlife Photographer of the Year 1991	Frans Lanting	Portfolio of 10 Images	Netherlands
1990	BG Wildlife Photographer of the Year 1990	Wendy Shattil	Red fox cub	(United States) USA
1989	Wildlife Photographer of the Year 1989	Jouni Ruuskanen	Red-throated diver	Finland
1988	Kodak Wildlife Photographer of the Year 1988	Jim Brandenburg	Gemsbok in the Namib desert, Namibia	(United States) USA
1987	Prudential Wildlife Photographer of the Year 1987	Jonathan Scott	Wild dog immobilising wildebeest	(United Kingdom) UK
1986	Prudential Wildlife Photographer of the Year 1986	Rajesh Bedi	Himalayan black bear	India
1985	Wildlife Photographer of the Year 1985	Charles Summers	Young cheetah coming to grips with its first springbok	(United States) USA
1984	Wildlife Photographer of the Year 1984	Richard Kemp and Julia Kemp	Diving goosander	(United Kingdom) UK

== The full list ==
Full available database from 1984 on

Year	Category	Name	Country	Result	Images
1984	1984 Wildlife Photographer of the Year grand title	Richard and Julika Kemp	United Kingdom	Winner	1
1985	1985 Wildlife Photographer of the Year grand title	Charles G. Summers Jr.	United States	Winner	1
1986	1986 Wildlife Photographer of the Year grand title	Rajesh Bedi	India	Winner	1
1987	1987 Wildlife Photographer of the Year grand title	Jonathan Scott	United Kingdom	Winner	1
1988	1988 Wildlife Photographer of the Year grand title	Jim Brandenburg	United States	Winner	1
1989	1989 Wildlife Photographer of the Year grand title	Jouni Ruuskanen	Finland	Winner	1
1990	1990 Wildlife Photographer of the Year grand title	Wendy Shattil	United States	Winner	1
1991	1991 Wildlife Photographer of the Year grand title	Frans Lanting	The Netherlands	Winning portfolio	5
1991	1991 Young Wildlife Photographer of the Year grand title	Charlie Hamilton James	United Kingdom	Winner	1
1991	Animal Behaviour - Mammals	Judd Cooney	United States	Specially commended	1
1991	Animal Behaviour - Mammals	Alain Saunier	Switzerland	Runner-up	1
1991	Animal Portraits	Frans Lanting	The Netherlands	Winner	1
1991	Animal Portraits	Rich Kirchner	United States	Runner-up	1
1991	Animal-Behaviour - All Other Animals	Erling Schön	Sweden	Winner	1
1991	Animal-Behaviour - All Other Animals	Gabriele Somenzi	Italy	Runner-up	1
1991	Animal-Behaviour - Birds	Benjamin Pontinen	Finland	Winner	1
1991	Animal-Behaviour - Birds	Gordon Court	New Zealand	Specially commended	1
1991	Animal-Behaviour - Birds	Risto Petäjämäki	Finland	Runner-up	1
1991	Animal-Behaviour - Insects	Hans Christoph Kappel	Germany	Winner	1
1991	Animal-Behaviour - Insects	Yuri Shibnev	USSR	Runner-up	1
1991	Composition and Form	Richard Herrmann	United States	Winner	1
1991	Composition and Form	Steven Fuller	United States	Runner-up	1
1991	Dusk to Dawn	Darryl Torckler	New Zealand	Winner	1
1991	Endangered Wildlife	André Bärtschi	Liechtenstein	Winner	1
1991	Endangered Wildlife	Antti Leinonen	Finland	Specially commended	1
1991	Endangered Wildlife	Sunjoy Monga	India	Runner-up	1
1991	Eric Hosking Award	Neil McIntyre	United Kingdom	Winner	9
1991	Humorous Views	Gary L Lackie	United States	Winner	1
1991	Humorous Views	Fritz Pölking	Germany	Runner-up	1
1991	In Praise of Plants	Frans Lanting	The Netherlands	Winner	1
1991	In Praise of Plants	Jan Töve Johansson	Sweden	Specially commended	1
1991	In Praise of Plants	Paul Taylor	United Kingdom	Runner-up	1
1991	The Underwater World	Jeffrey L Rotman	United States	Winner	1
1991	The Underwater World	Allen Wayne Campbell	United States	Runner-up	1
1991	The World in Our Hands	Pam Kemp	United Kingdom	Winner	1
1991	The World in Our Hands	Vincent McGoldrick	United Kingdom	Runner-up	1
1991	Wild Places	Kim Westerskov	New Zealand	Winner	1
1991	Wild Places	David Noton	United Kingdom	Runner-up	1
1991	Wildlife Photographer of the year	Burt Jones and Maurine Shimlock	United States	Runner-up portfolio	9
1991	Wildlife Photographer of the year	Konrad Wothe	Germany	Runner-up portfolio	10
1991	Young Wildlife Photographer of the Year: 10 years and under	James Akers	United Kingdom	Winner	1
1991	Young Wildlife Photographer of the Year: 10 years and under	Rebecca Dean	United Kingdom	Runner-up	1
1991	Young Wildlife Photographer of the Year: 11–14 years	Rhian Thomas	United Kingdom	Winner	1
1991	Young Wildlife Photographer of the Year: 11–14 years	John Broadbent	United Kingdom	Runner-up	1
1991	Young Wildlife Photographer of the Year: 15–17 years	Nick Sayer	United Kingdom	Runner-up	1
1992	1992 Wildlife Photographer of the Year grand title	André Bärtschi	Liechtenstein	Winner	1
1992	1992 Young Wildlife Photographer of the Year grand title	Torsten Brehm	Germany	Winner	1
1992	Animal Behaviour - All Others	David F Toney	United States	Winner	1
1992	Animal Behaviour - All Others	Vivek R Sinha	India	Runner-up	1
1992	Animal Behaviour - Birds	Niall Benvie	United Kingdom	Winner	1
1992	Animal Behaviour - Birds	Neil McIntyre	United Kingdom	Runner-up	1
1992	Animal Behaviour - Insects	Andy Newman	United Kingdom	Winner	1
1992	Animal Behaviour - Insects	Felix Labhardt	Switzerland	Runner-up	1
1992	Animal Behaviour - Mammals	Kennan Ward	United States	Winner	1
1992	Animal Behaviour - Mammals	Jagdeep Rajput	India	Specially commended	1
1992	Animal Behaviour - Mammals	Gerald Hinde	South Africa	Runner-up	1
1992	Animal Portraits	Samantha Purdy	United Kingdom	Winner	1
1992	Animal Portraits	Niall Benvie	United Kingdom	Specially commended	1
1992	Animal Portraits	Manfred Klindwort	Germany	Runner-up	1
1992	Composition and Form	Darryl Torckler	New Zealand	Joint Winner	1
1992	Composition and Form	Theresa Thompson	United States	Joint Winner	1
1992	Composition and Form	Erik Bjurstrom	Sweden	Joint Runner-up	1
1992	Composition and Form	Mike Wilkes	United Kingdom	Joint Runner-up	1
1992	Endangered Wildlife	Joanna Van Gruisen	United Kingdom	Winner	1
1992	Endangered Wildlife	Antti Leinonen	Finland	Runner-up	1
1992	Eric Hosking Award	Neil McIntyre	United Kingdom	Winner	6
1992	Eric Hosking Award	Asgeir Helgestad	Norway	Runner-up	6
1992	From Dusk to Dawn	Laurie Campbell	United Kingdom	Winner	1
1992	From Dusk to Dawn	Gordon Court	Canada	Specially commended	1
1992	From Dusk to Dawn	John Eastscott and Yva Momatiuk	New Zealand/ United States	Runner-up	1
1992	In Praise of Plants	Theresa Thompson	United States	Winner	1
1992	In Praise of Plants	Gary Speer	New Zealand	Specially commended	1
1992	In Praise of Plants	Jan Töve Johansson	Sweden	Runner-up	1
1992	Primates in Peril	Luis Miguel Ruiz Gordon	Spain	Winner	1
1992	Primates in Peril	Gerry Ellis	United States	Runner-up	1
1992	The Underwater World	J Michael Kelly	United States	Winner	1
1992	The Underwater World	Norbert Wu	United States	Specially commended	1
1992	The Underwater World	David Hall	United States	Runner-up	1
1992	The Underwater World	Georgette Douwma	The Netherlands	Runner-up	1
1992	The World in Our Hands	Guy Hobbs	United Kingdom	Winner	1
1992	The World in Our Hands	Richard Packwood	United Kingdom	Runner-up	1
1992	Wild Places	Keijo Penttinen	Finland	Winner	1
1992	Young Wildlife Photographer of the Year 'Going Live!' Award	Lucinda Munn	United Kingdom	Going Live!' Award	1
1992	Young Wildlife Photographer of the Year WWF Award	Louise Dean	United Kingdom	WWF Award	1
1992	Young Wildlife Photographer of the Year: 10 years and under	Alex Waterfield	United Kingdom	Winner	1
1992	Young Wildlife Photographer of the Year: 10 years and under	Daniel Andrews	United Kingdom	Runner-up	1
1992	Young Wildlife Photographer of the Year: 11–14 years	Rosie Bomford	United Kingdom	Winner	1
1992	Young Wildlife Photographer of the Year: 11–14 years	Michael Hill	United Kingdom	Specially commended	1
1992	Young Wildlife Photographer of the Year: 11–14 years	Rebecca Dean	United Kingdom	Runner-up	1
1992	Young Wildlife Photographer of the Year: 15–17 years	Torsten Brehm	Germany	Winner	1
1992	Young Wildlife Photographer of the Year: 15–17 years	Jutta Sander	Germany	Runner-up	1
1993	1993 Wildlife Photographer of the Year grand title	Martyn Colbeck	United Kingdom	Winner	1
1993	1993 Young Wildlife Photographer of the Year grand title	Michael Hill	United Kingdom	Winner	1
1993	Animal Behaviour - Birds	Pål Hermansen	Norway	Winner	1
1993	Animal Behaviour - Birds	Bernhard Wolfschläger	Austria	Specially commended	1
1993	Animal Behaviour - Birds	Klaus Nigge	Germany	Runner-up	1
1993	Animal Behaviour - Mammals	Barry Wilkins	South Africa	Winner	1
1993	Animal Behaviour - Mammals	Art Wolfe	United States	Specially commended	1
1993	Animal Behaviour - Mammals	Konrad Wothe	Germany	Runner-up	1
1993	Animal Portraits	Markku Aikioniemi	Finland	Winner	1
1993	Animal Portraits	Mark Layton	United Kingdom	Joint Runner-up	1
1993	Animal Portraits	William Paton	United States	Joint Runner-up	1
1993	Composition and Form	David Hall	United States	Joint Winner	1
1993	Composition and Form	Jorma Peiponen	Finland	Joint Winner	1
1993	Endangered Wildlife	Gertrud and Helmut Denzau	Germany	Winner	1
1993	Endangered Wildlife	Martyn Colbeck	United Kingdom	Runner-up	1
1993	Eric Hosking Award	Asgeir Helgestad	Norway	Winner	6
1993	Eric Hosking Award	Tim Jackson	United Kingdom	Runner-up	6
1993	From Dusk to Dawn	Klaus Nigge	Germany	Winner	1
1993	From Dusk to Dawn	Barry Wilkins	South Africa	Specially commended	1
1993	From Dusk to Dawn	Jukka Lehtonen	Finland	Runner-up	1
1993	In Praise of Plants	Tim Davis	United States	Winner	1
1993	In Praise of Plants	Jan Töve Johansson	Sweden	Runner-up	1
1993	In Praise of Plants	Nick Després	United Kingdom	Best Fungi Picture	1
1993	In Praise of Wetlands	Dilys King	United Kingdom	Winner	1
1993	In Praise of Wetlands	Nicolas Van Ingen	France	Specially commended	1
1993	In Praise of Wetlands	Yva Momatiuk and John Eastcott	United States	Runner-up	1
1993	The Underwater World	Kim Westerskov	New Zealand	Winner	1
1993	The Underwater World	Doug Perrine	United States	Runner-up	1
1993	The World in Our Hands	Brian Lightfoot	United Kingdom	Joint Winner	1
1993	The World in Our Hands	Joanna Van Gruisen	United Kingdom	Joint Winner	1
1993	The World in Our Hands	Karl Amman	Switzerland	Joint Winner	1
1993	Urban and Garden Wildlife	Seppo Valjakka	Finland	Winner	1
1993	Urban and Garden Wildlife	Péter Bárdos Deák	Hungary	Runner-up	1
1993	Wild Places	David Hiser	United States	Winner	1
1993	Young Wildlife Photographer of the Year	Thorsten Brehm	Germany	Winner - Young Ornithologists' Club Award	1
1993	Young Wildlife Photographer of the Year	John Broadbent	United Kingdom	Winner	1
1993	Young Wildlife Photographer of the Year	Manuel Resino	Spain	Winner	1
1993	Young Wildlife Photographer of the Year	Michael Hill	United Kingdom	Winner	1
1993	Young Wildlife Photographer of the Year	Claire Thomas	United Kingdom	Runner-up	1
1993	Young Wildlife Photographer of the Year	Diderik Notenboom	The Netherlands	Runner-up	1
1993	Young Wildlife Photographer of the Year	Elizabeth Rowlands	United Kingdom	Runner-up	1
1994	1994 Wildlife Photographer of the Year grand title	Thomas D Mangelsen	United States	Winner	1
1994	1994 Young Wildlife Photographer of the Year grand title	Louise Dean	United Kingdom	Winner	1
1994	Animal Behaviour - All Others	Franklin J Viola	United States	Winner	1
1994	Animal Behaviour - All Others	Fritz Pölking	Germany	Runner-up	1
1994	Animal Behaviour - Birds	Mary Ann McDonald	United States	Winner	1
1994	Animal Behaviour - Birds	Mike Hill	United Kingdom	Specially commended	1
1994	Animal Behaviour - Birds	Francisco Márquez	Spain	Runner-up	1
1994	Animal Behaviour - Mammals	Erwin and Peggy Bauer	United States	Specially commended	1
1994	Animal Behaviour - Mammals	Jean-Louis Klein and Marie-Luce Hubert	France	Specially commended	1
1994	Animal Behaviour - Mammals	George D Lepp	United States	Runner-up	1
1994	Animal Behaviour - Mammals	Carl R Sams II	United States	Joint Winner	1
1994	Animal Behaviour - Mammals	Konrad Wothe	Germany	Joint Winner	1
1994	Animal Portraits	Mitsuhiko Imamori	Japan	Winner	1
1994	Animal Portraits	Brian Kenney	United States	Runner-up	1
1994	British Wildlife	Alan James	England	Winner	1
1994	British Wildlife	John Neil	England	Specially commended	1
1994	British Wildlife	Peter Moore	Scotland	Runner-up	1
1994	Composition and Form	Bruce Davidson	Kenya	Specially commended	1
1994	Composition and Form	Asko Hämäläinen	Finland	Joint Winner	1
1994	Composition and Form	Mike Hill	United Kingdom	Joint Winner	1
1994	Endangered Wildlife	Mary Ann McDonald	United States	Winner	1
1994	Endangered Wildlife	Bruce Davidson	Kenya	Joint Runner-up	1
1994	Endangered Wildlife	Konrad Wothe	Germany	Joint Runner-up	1
1994	Eric Hosking Award	Peter Chadwick	South Africa	Winner	6
1994	From Dusk to Dawn	Antti Leinonen	Finland	Winner	1
1994	From Dusk to Dawn	Geoff Doré	United Kingdom	Joint Runner-up	1
1994	From Dusk to Dawn	Mitsuhiko Imamori	Japan	Joint Runner-up	1
1994	In Praise of Plants	Asle Hjellbrekke	Norway	Winner	1
1994	In Praise of Plants	Jürgen Freund	Germany	Specially commended	1
1994	In Praise of Plants	Bernard Castelein	Belgium	Runner-up	1
1994	Reptiles at Risk	Hal Beral	United States	Winner	1
1994	Reptiles at Risk	André Bärtschi	Liechtenstein	Runner-up	1
1994	The Underwater World	Kelvin Aitken	New Zealand	Winner	1
1994	The Underwater World	Norbert Wu	United States	Runner-up	1
1994	The World in Our Hands	Karl Amman	Switzerland	Winner	1
1994	Urban and Garden Wildlife	Jason Venus	United Kingdom	Winner	1
1994	Urban and Garden Wildlife	Thomas D Mangelsen	United States	Runner-up	1
1994	Young Wildlife Photographer of the Year Newsround Award	Michael Hill	United Kingdom	Winner: Newsround Award	1
1994	Young Wildlife Photographer of the Year Watch Award	Ross Hoddinott	United Kingdom	Winner Watch Award	1
1994	Young Wildlife Photographer of the Year: 10 years and under	Gareth Westerkov	New Zealand	Winner	1
1994	Young Wildlife Photographer of the Year: 10 years and under	Jiwan Kaur	India	Runner-up	1
1994	Young Wildlife Photographer of the Year: 11–14 years	Malcolm Kemp	United Kingdom	Winner	1
1994	Young Wildlife Photographer of the Year: 11–14 years	Rachel Hingley	United Kingdom	Runner-up	1
1994	Young Wildlife Photographer of the Year: 15–17 years	Michael Hill	United Kingdom	Winner	1
1994	Young Wildlife Photographer of the Year: 15–17 years	Tristan Millen	United Kingdom	Runner-up	1
1995	1995 Wildlife Photographer of the Year grand title	Cherry Alexander	United Kingdom	Winner	1
1995	1995 Young Wildlife Photographer of the Year grand title	Ross Hoddinott	United Kingdom	Winner	1
1995	Animal Behaviour - All Others	Doug Perrine	United States	Winner	1
1995	Animal Behaviour - All Others	Darryl Torckler	New Zealand	Runner-up	1
1995	Animal Behaviour - Birds	Roger Wilmhurst	United Kingdom	Winner	1
1995	Animal Behaviour - Birds	Konrad Wothe	Germany	Specially commended	1
1995	Animal Behaviour - Birds	Thomas D Mangelsen	United States	Runner-up	1
1995	Animal Behaviour - Mammals	Richard du Toit	South Africa	Winner	1
1995	Animal Behaviour - Mammals	Kevin Shafer	United States	Runner-up	1
1995	Animal Portraits	Heidi and Hans-Jürgen Koch	Germany	Winner	1
1995	Animal Portraits	Chris Mattison	United Kingdom	Runner-up	1
1995	Animal Portraits	Florian Möllers	Germany	Joint-Specially commended	1
1995	Animal Portraits	Frank Krahmer	Germany	Joint-Specially commended	1
1995	British Wildlife	Paul Hicks	United Kingdom	Winner	1
1995	British Wildlife	Andrew Bailey	United Kingdom	Runner-up	1
1995	Composition and Form	Roger Lewis Johnson	United States	Winner	1
1995	Composition and Form	Gary Braasch	United States	Specially commended	1
1995	Composition and Form	Dr Mamoru Yoshida	United States	Runner-up	1
1995	Eric Hosking Award	Brandon D Cole	United States	Winner	6
1995	From Dusk to Dawn	Richard Coomber	United Kingdom	Winner	1
1995	From Dusk to Dawn	Gary Schultz	United States	Runner-up	1
1995	Gerard Durrell Award for Endangered Wildlife	Jean-Pierre Zwaenepoel	Belgium	Winner	1
1995	Gerard Durrell Award for Endangered Wildlife	Jagdeep Rajput	India	Runner-up	1
1995	In Praise of Plants	Adam Jones	United States	Winner	1
1995	In Praise of Plants	Csaba Forrásy	Hungary	Specially commended	1
1995	In Praise of Plants	Brian Lightfoot	United Kingdom	Runner-up	1
1995	The Underwater World	Darryl Torckler	New Zealand	Winner	1
1995	The Underwater World	Heinz Schimpke	Germany	Runner-up	1
1995	The World in Our Hands	Karl Amman	Switzerland	Winner	1
1995	The World in Our Hands	David Woodfall	United Kingdom	Runner-up	1
1995	Urban and Garden Wildlife	Tapani Räsänen	Finland	Winner	1
1995	Urban and Garden Wildlife	Jill Sneesby and Barry Wilkins	South Africa	Runner-up	1
1995	Wild Places	Gilbert Hays	Australia	Winner	1
1995	Wild Places	Claudia Auer	Germany	Runner-up	1
1995	Wildlife in Trade	Martin Harvey	South Africa	Winner	1
1995	Wildlife in Trade	Pete Oxford	United Kingdom	Runner-up	1
1995	Young Wildlife Photographer of the Year BBC Newsround Young Wildlife Photojournalist Award	Neil Davy	United Kingdom	Winner: BBC Newsround Young Wildlife Photojournalist Award	1
1995	Young Wildlife Photographer of the Year Yoc Award	Michael Hill	United Kingdom	Winner: YOC Award	1
1995	Young Wildlife Photographer of the Year Yong Telegraph Award	Louise Dean	United Kingdom	Winner: Young Telegraph Award	1
1995	Young Wildlife Photographer of the Year: 10 years and under	Iwan T Fletcher	United Kingdom	Winner	1
1995	Young Wildlife Photographer of the Year: 11–14 years	Rachel Hingley	United Kingdom	Winner	1
1995	Young Wildlife Photographer of the Year: 11–14 years	Richard Hill	United Kingdom	Runner-up	1
1995	Young Wildlife Photographer of the Year: 15–17 years	Michael Hill	United Kingdom	Winner	1
1995	Young Wildlife Photographer of the Year: 15–17 years	Sven Zellner	Germany	Runner-up	1
1996	1996 Wildlife Photographer of the Year grand title	Jason Venus	United Kingdom	Winner	1
1996	1996 Young Wildlife Photographer of the Year grand title	Nicky Wilton in book	South Africa	Winner	1
1996	Animal Behaviour - All Others	Patrick Baker	Australia	Winner	1
1996	Animal Behaviour - All Others	Larry P Tackett	United States	Runner-up	1
1996	Animal Behaviour - Birds	Derrick Hamrick	United States	Winner	1
1996	Animal Behaviour - Birds	Tom Schandy	Norway	Specially commended	1
1996	Animal Behaviour - Birds	Norman Cobley	United Kingdom	Runner-up	1
1996	Animal Behaviour - Mammals	Adrian Bailey	South Africa	Winner	1
1996	Animal Behaviour - Mammals	Yva Momatiuk and John Eastcott	United States/ New Zealand	Runner-up	1
1996	Animal Portraits	Konrad Wothe	Germany	Winner	1
1996	Animal Portraits	Fred Bavendam	United States	Specially commended	1
1996	Animal Portraits	Johannes Lahti	Finland	Runner-up	1
1996	Eric Hosking Award	Heinrich van den Berg	South Africa	Winner	6
1996	From Dusk to Dawn	Frans Lanting	The Netherlands	Winner	1
1996	From Dusk to Dawn	Chris Daphne	South Africa	Runner-up	1
1996	Gerard Durrell Award for Endangered Wildlife	Martyn Colbeck	United Kingdom	Winner	1
1996	Gerard Durrell Award for Endangered Wildlife	Malcolm Hey	United Kingdom	Runner-up	1
1996	In Praise of Plants	Theo Allofs	Germany	Winner	1
1996	In Praise of Plants	Dr Hermann Brehm	Germany	Runner-up	1
1996	The Underwater World	Doug Allan	United Kingdom	Winner	1
1996	The Underwater World	Fred Bavendam	United States	Specially commended	1
1996	The Underwater World	Tony Karacsonyi	Australia	Runner-up	1
1996	The World in Our Hands	Karl Amman	Switzerland	Winner	1
1996	The World in Our Hands	Paul Kay	United Kingdom	Runner-up	1
1996	Urban and Garden Wildlife	Nick Garbutt	United Kingdom	Winner	1
1996	Urban and Garden Wildlife	Staffan Widstrand	Sweden	Runner-up	1
1996	Wild Places	Werner Reuteler	Switzerland	Winner	1
1996	Wild Places	Doug Locke	United States	Runner-up	1
1996	Young Wildlife Photographer of the Year: 10 years and under	Janina Salo	Finland	Winner	1
1996	Young Wildlife Photographer of the Year: 10 years and under	Janina Salo	Finland	Runner-up	1
1996	Young Wildlife Photographer of the Year: 11–14 years	Verena Hahl	Germany	Winner	1
1996	Young Wildlife Photographer of the Year: 11–14 years	Nicky Wilton	South Africa	Runner-up	1
1996	Young Wildlife Photographer of the Year: 15–17 years	Claire Thomas	United Kingdom	Winner	1
1996	Young Wildlife Photographer of the Year: 15–17 years	Barnaby Hall	United Kingdom	Runner-up	1
1997	1997 Wildlife Photographer of the Year grand title	Tapani Räsänen	Finland	Winner	1
1997	1997 Young Wildlife Photographer of the Year grand title	Rebecca Dean	United Kingdom	Winner	1
1997	Animal Behaviour - All Others	Andy Belcher	New Zealand	Winner	1
1997	Animal Behaviour - All Others	Frank Neumann	Germany	Runner-up	1
1997	Animal Behaviour - Birds	Torsten Brehm	Germany	Winner	1
1997	Animal Behaviour - Birds	Thomas D Mangelsen	United States	Runner-up	1
1997	Animal Behaviour - Mammals	Anup Shah	United Kingdom	Winner	1
1997	Animal Behaviour - Mammals	Eero Kemilä	Finland	Runner-up	1
1997	Animal Portraits	Richard du Toit	South Africa	Winner	1
1997	Animal Portraits	Daniel J Cox	United States	Runner-up	1
1997	British Wildlife	Russell Hartwell	United Kingdom	Winner	1
1997	British Wildlife	Dr David J Slater	United Kingdom	Runner-up	1
1997	Composition and Form	Lawrence A Michael	United States	Winner	1
1997	Composition and Form	Whit Bronaugh	United States	Specially commended	1
1997	Composition and Form	Arthur Morris	United States	Runner-up	1
1997	Eric Hosking Award	Heinrich van den Berg	South Africa	Winner	6
1997	From Dusk to Dawn	Dale Hancock	South Africa	Winner	1
1997	From Dusk to Dawn	Steve Austin	United Kingdom	Specially commended	1
1997	From Dusk to Dawn	Magnus Nyman	Sweden	Runner-up	1
1997	Gerard Durrell Award for Endangered Wildlife	Kevin Shafer	United States	Winner	1
1997	Gerard Durrell Award for Endangered Wildlife	Anup Shah	United Kingdom	Runner-up	1
1997	In Praise of Plants	Paavo Hamunen	Finland	Winner	1
1997	In Praise of Plants	Laurie Campbell	United Kingdom	Runner-up	1
1997	The Underwater World	Reinhard Dirscherl	Germany	Winner	1
1997	The Underwater World	Tui De Roy	New Zealand	Runner-up	1
1997	The World in Our Hands	Staffan Widstrand	Sweden	Winner	1
1997	The World in Our Hands	David B Fleetham	Canada	Runner-up	1
1997	Urban and Garden Wildlife	Staffan Widstrand	Sweden	Winner	1
1997	Urban and Garden Wildlife	Janos Jurka	Sweden	Runner-up	1
1997	Wild Places	Howie Garber	United States	Winner	1
1997	Wild Places	Jun Ogawa	Japan	Runner-up	1
1997	Young Wildlife Photographer of the Year: 10 years and under	Daniel Gritz	United States	Winner	1
1997	Young Wildlife Photographer of the Year: 10 years and under	Daniel Gritz	United States	Runner-up	1
1997	Young Wildlife Photographer of the Year: 11–14 years	Fabian Fischer	Germany	Winner	1
1997	Young Wildlife Photographer of the Year: 11–14 years	Verena Hahl	Germany	Runner-up	1
1997	Young Wildlife Photographer of the Year: 15–17 years	Malcolm Kemp	United Kingdom	Winner	1
1997	Young Wildlife Photographer of the Year: 15–17 years	Anne Meyer	France	Runner-up	1
1998	1998 Wildlife Photographer of the Year grand title	Manfred Danegger	Germany	Winner	1
1998	1998 Young Wildlife Photographer of the Year grand title	Brandon T Garland	United States	Winner	1
1998	Animal Behaviour - All Other Animals	Gerry Bishop	United States	Winner	1
1998	Animal Behaviour - All Other Animals	Tsutomu Yanabe	Japan	Runner-up	1
1998	Animal Behaviour - Birds	Kari Reponen	Finland	Winner	1
1998	Animal Behaviour - Birds	Timothy Galagher	United Kingdom	Specially commended	1
1998	Animal Behaviour - Birds	Bernhard Volmer	Germany	Runner-up	1
1998	Animal Behaviour - Mammals	Andy Rouse	United Kingdom	Winner	1
1998	Animal Behaviour - Mammals	Robert Wong	United States	Runner-up	1
1998	Animal Portraits	Geoff Doré	United Kingdom	Winner	1
1998	Animal Portraits	Edmund Fellowes	United Kingdom	Specially commended	1
1998	Animal Portraits	John Mielcarek	United States	Runner-up	1
1998	British Wildlife	Roy Glen	United Kingdom	Winner	1
1998	British Wildlife	Simon Booth	United Kingdom	Specially commended	1
1998	British Wildlife	Laurie Campbell	United Kingdom	Runner-up	1
1998	Composition and Form	Adriano Turcatti	Italy	Winner	1
1998	Composition and Form	David Lyons	United Kingdom	Specially commended	1
1998	Composition and Form	Adrian Bailey	South Africa	Runner-up	1
1998	Eric Hosking Award	Jamie Thom	South Africa	Winner	6
1998	From Dusk to Dawn	Beverly Joubert	South Africa	Winner	1
1998	Gerard Durrell Award for Endangered Wildlife	Dr Freek van Eeden	South Africa	Winner	1
1998	Gerard Durrell Award for Endangered Wildlife	Michael Nichols	United States	Runner-up	1
1998	In Praise of Plants	Fredrik Ehrenström	Sweden	Winner	1
1998	In Praise of Plants	Robert McKemie	United States	Runner-up	1
1998	The Underwater World	Fred Bavendam	United States	Winner	1
1998	The Underwater World	Dan Welsh-Bon	United States	Runner-up	1
1998	The World in Our Hands	Lorne Gill	United Kingdom	Winner	1
1998	The World in Our Hands	Richard du Toit	South Africa	Specially commended	1
1998	The World in Our Hands	Fritz Pölking	Germany	Runner-up	1
1998	Urban and Garden Wildlife	Raoul Slater	Australia	Winner	1
1998	Urban and Garden Wildlife	James Warwick	United Kingdom	Runner-up	1
1998	Wild Places	Andreas Leeman	Switzerland	Winner	1
1998	Wild Places	Janos Jurka	Sweden	Runner-up	1
1998	Young Wildlife Photographer of the Year Yoc Award	Rebecca Dean	United Kingdom	Winner: YOC Award	1
1998	Young Wildlife Photographer of the Year: 10 years and under	María Cano	Spain	Winner	1
1998	Young Wildlife Photographer of the Year: 11–14 years	Verena Hahl	Germany	Winner	1
1998	Young Wildlife Photographer of the Year: 11–14 years	David Scott	United Kingdom	Runner-up	1
1998	Young Wildlife Photographer of the Year: 15–17 years	Brandon T Garland	United States	Winner	1
1998	Young Wildlife Photographer of the Year: 15–17 years	Rachel Hingley	United Kingdom	Specially commended	1
1998	Young Wildlife Photographer of the Year: 15–17 years	Fabian Fischer	Germany	Runner-up	1
1999	1999 Wildlife Photographer of the Year grand title	Jamie Thom	South Africa	Winner	1
1999	1999 Young Wildlife Photographer of the Year grand title	Nick Wilton	South Africa	Winner	1
1999	Animal Behaviour - All Other Animals	Thomas Endlein	Germany	Winner	1
1999	Animal Behaviour - All Other Animals	Robert and Virginia Small	Canada/ United States	Runner-up	1
1999	Animal Behaviour - Birds	Uwe Walz	Germany	Winner	1
1999	Animal Behaviour - Birds	Yossi Eshbol	Israel	Runner-up	1
1999	Animal Behaviour - Mammals	Michel Denis-Huot	France	Winner	1
1999	Animal Behaviour - Mammals	Adrian Bailey	South Africa	Runner-up	1
1999	Animal Portraits	Conny Lundström	Sweden	Winner	1
1999	Animal Portraits	Patricio Robles Gil	Mexico	Runner-up	1
1999	British Wildlife	Ron Perkins	United Kingdom	Winner	1
1999	British Wildlife	Terry Andrewartha	United Kingdom	Runner-up	1
1999	Composition and Form	Jan-Peter Lahall	Sweden	Winner	1
1999	Composition and Form	Stephen G Maka	United States	Runner-up	1
1999	Eric Hosking Award	Jamie Thom	South Africa	Winner	6
1999	From Dusk to Dawn	Andrea Bonetti	Switzerland	Winner	1
1999	Gerard Durrell Award for Endangered Wildlife	Anup Shah	United Kingdom	Winner	1
1999	Gerard Durrell Award for Endangered Wildlife	Pete Atkinson	United Kingdom	Runner-up	1
1999	In Praise of Plants	Olaf Broders	Germany	Winner	1
1999	In Praise of Plants	Darryl Torckler	New Zealand	Runner-up	1
1999	The Underwater World	Gayle Jamison	United States	Winner	1
1999	The Underwater World	Peter Ladell	United Kingdom	Runner-up	1
1999	The World in Our Hands	Karl Amman	Switzerland	Winner	1
1999	The World in Our Hands	William Osborn	United Kingdom	Runner-up	1
1999	Urban and Garden Wildlife	Theo Allofs	Germany	Winner	1
1999	Urban and Garden Wildlife	Norbert Wu	United States	Runner-up	1
1999	Wild Places	Jan-Peter Lahall	Sweden	Winner	1
1999	Wild Places	Manfred Pfefferie	Germany	Runner-up	1
1999	Young Wildlife Photographer of the Year meg@ Award - Young & Wild	David Scott	United Kingdom	Winner - meg@ Award - Young & Wild	1
1999	Young Wildlife Photographer of the Year Yoc Award-Close To Home	Anne Meyer	France	Winner - YOC Award	1
1999	Young Wildlife Photographer of the Year: 10 years and under	Ashleigh Rennie	South Africa	Winner	1
1999	Young Wildlife Photographer of the Year: 10 years and under	Adam P Bloom	United Kingdom	Runner-up	1
1999	Young Wildlife Photographer of the Year: 11–14 years	Becky L Chadd	United Kingdom	Winner	1
1999	Young Wildlife Photographer of the Year: 11–14 years	David Scott	United Kingdom	Runner-up	1
1999	Young Wildlife Photographer of the Year: 15–17 years	Fabian Fischer	Germany	Winner	1
1999	Young Wildlife Photographer of the Year: 15–17 years	Silvia Morgante	Italy	Runner-up	1
2000	2000 Wildlife Photographer of the Year grand title	Manoj Shah	United Kingdom	Winner	1
2000	2000 Young Wildlife Photographer of the Year grand title	Kobe van Looveren	Belgium	Winner	1
2000	Animal Behaviour - Birds	Tim Fitzharris	United States	Winner	1
2000	Animal Behaviour - Birds	Richard Kuzminski	United States	Runner-up	1
2000	Animal Behaviour - Mammals	Tony Heald	United Kingdom	Winner	1
2000	Animal Behaviour - Mammals	Kari Reponen	Finland	Runner-up	1
2000	Animal Behaviour - Other Animals	Ryo Maki	Japan	Winner	1
2000	Animal Behaviour - Other Animals	Winfried Wisniewski	Germany	Runner-up	1
2000	Animal Portraits	Ingo Arndt	Germany	Winner	1
2000	Animal Portraits	Raoul Slater	Australia	Specially commended	1
2000	Animal Portraits	Thomas Haider	Austria	Runner-up	1
2000	British Wildlife	Andy Newman	United Kingdom	Winner	1
2000	Composition and Form	Jim Petek	United States	Winner	1
2000	Composition and Form	Helen A Jones	Canada	Runner-up	1
2000	Eric Hosking Award	Vincent Munier	France	Winner	6
2000	From Dusk to Dawn	Mike Mockler	United Kingdom	Winner	1
2000	From Dusk to Dawn	Armin Maywald	Germany	Runner-up	1
2000	Gerard Durrell Award for Endangered Wildlife	Nick Garbutt	United Kingdom	Winner	1
2000	Gerard Durrell Award for Endangered Wildlife	Tom Schandy	Norway	Runner-up	1
2000	In Praise of Plants	Hans Strand	Sweden	Winner	1
2000	In Praise of Plants	Bror Johansson	Sweden	Runner-up	1
2000	The Underwater World	David Hall	United States	Winner	1
2000	The Underwater World	Paul Nicklen	Canada	Runner-up	1
2000	The World in Our Hands	Mike Powles	United Kingdom	Winner	1
2000	The World in Our Hands	Tom Campbell	United States	Runner-up	1
2000	Urban and Garden Wildlife	Dale Hancock	South Africa	Winner	1
2000	Urban and Garden Wildlife	Hannu Ahonen	Finland	Runner-up	1
2000	Wild Places	Jeremy Woodhouse	United States	Winner	1
2000	Wild Places	Sven Zellner	Sweden	Runner-up	1
2000	Young Wildlife Photographer of the Year	Kobe van Looveren	Belgium	Winner: RSPB Wildlife Explorers Award	1
2000	Young Wildlife Photographer of the Year	Dan Slootmaekers	Belgium	Winner: meg@ award	1
2000	Young Wildlife Photographer of the Year: 10 years and under	Oliver Kois	Germany	Winner	1
2000	Young Wildlife Photographer of the Year: 11–14 years	Becky Chadd	United Kingdom	Winner	1
2000	Young Wildlife Photographer of the Year: 11–14 years	Ashleigh Rennie	South Africa	Runner-up	1
2000	Young Wildlife Photographer of the Year: 15–17 years	Fabian Fischer	Germany	Winner	1
2000	Young Wildlife Photographer of the Year: 15–17 years	Fabian Fischer	Germany	Runner-up	1
2001	2001 Wildlife Photographer of the Year grand title	Tobias Bernhard	Germany	Winner	1
2001	2001 Young Wildlife Photographer of the Year grand title	Rony Vander Elst	Belgium	Winner	1
2001	Animal Behaviour - Birds	Louis-Marie Préau	France	Winner	1
2001	Animal Behaviour - Birds	Norbert Wu	United States	Runner-up	1
2001	Animal Behaviour - Mammals	Tim Fitzharris	United States	Winner	1
2001	Animal Behaviour - Mammals	Staffan Widstrand	Sweden	Specially commended	1
2001	Animal Behaviour - Mammals	Martin Harvey	South Africa	Runner-up	1
2001	Animal Behaviour - Other Animals	Christian Ziegler	Germany	Winner	1
2001	Animal Behaviour - Other Animals	Mark Payne-Gill	United Kingdom	Runner-up	1
2001	Animal Portraits	Mervin D Coleman	United States	Winner	1
2001	Animal Portraits	Richard Kuzminski	United States	Runner-up	1
2001	British Wildlife	Doug McCutcheon	United Kingdom	Winner	1
2001	British Wildlife	Chris Williams	United Kingdom	Specially commended	1
2001	British Wildlife	Kevin Schafer	United States	Runner-up	1
2001	Composition and Form	Hans Strand	Sweden	Winner	1
2001	Composition and Form	Jan Töve	Sweden	Runner-up	1
2001	Eric Hosking Award	Vincent Munier	France	Winner	6
2001	From Dusk to Dawn	José L Gómez de Francisco	Spain	Winner	1
2001	From Dusk to Dawn	Adrian Bailey	South Africa	Runner-up	1
2001	Gerard Durrell Award for Endangered Wildlife	Xi Zhinong	China	Winner	1
2001	Gerard Durrell Award for Endangered Wildlife	Brigitte Marcon and Jean-Jacques Alcalay	France	Runner-up	1
2001	In Praise of Plants	Jun Ogawa	Japan	Winner	1
2001	In Praise of Plants	Thomas D Mangelsen	United States	Runner-up	1
2001	The Underwater World	Norbert Wu	United States	Winner	1
2001	The Underwater World	Paul Nicklen	Canada	Specially commended	1
2001	The Underwater World	Nick de Voys	United Kingdom	Runner-up	1
2001	The World in Our Hands	Pete Oxford	United Kingdom	Winner	1
2001	The World in Our Hands	H Heinz Rauschenberger	Germany	Runner-up	1
2001	Wild Places	Jan Töve	Sweden	Winner	1
2001	Wild Places	Vincent Munier	France	Specially commended	1
2001	Wild Places	Joel Sartore	United States	Runner-up	1
2001	Young Wildlife Photographer of the Year: 10 years and under	Jaco Weldhagen	South Africa	Winner	1
2001	Young Wildlife Photographer of the Year: 10 years and under	Gemalla Daisy Symons	Australia	Runner-up	1
2001	Young Wildlife Photographer of the Year: 11–14 years	Mario Cano	Spain	Winner	1
2001	Young Wildlife Photographer of the Year: 11–14 years	Ashleigh Rennie	South Africa	Runner-up	1
2001	Young Wildlife Photographer of the Year: 15–17 years	Iwan Fletcher	United Kingdom	Winner	1
2001	Young Wildlife Photographer of the Year: 15–17 years	Keenan Brown	United States	Runner-up	1
2002	2002 Wildlife Photographer of the Year grand title	Angie Scott	Kenya	Winner	1
2002	2002 Young Wildlife Photographer of the Year grand title	Bence Máté	Hungary	Winner	1
2002	Animal Behaviour - All Other Animals	Adrian Hepworth	United Kingdom	Winner	1
2002	Animal Behaviour - All Other Animals	David Vilasis Boix	Spain	Runner-up	1
2002	Animal Behaviour - Birds	Bernd Zoller	Germany	Winner	1
2002	Animal Behaviour - Birds	Tim Laman	United States	Runner-up	1
2002	Animal Behaviour - Mammals	Duncan Murrell	United Kingdom	Winner	1
2002	Animal Behaviour - Mammals	Gavin Parsons	United Kingdom	Specially commended	1
2002	Animal Behaviour - Mammals	Charles W McRae	United States	Runner-up	1
2002	Animal Portraits	Martin Harvey	South Africa	Winner	1
2002	Animal Portraits	Torbjörn Lilja	Sweden	Runner-up	1
2002	Animal Portraits	Christoph Wermter	Germany		1
2002	British Wildlife	Rob Jordan	United Kingdom	Winner	1
2002	British Wildlife	Mark Hamblin	United Kingdom	Specially commended	1
2002	British Wildlife	Mike Hill	United Kingdom	Runner-up	1
2002	Composition and Form	Ellen B Goff	United States	Winner	1
2002	Composition and Form	Claudio Contreras Koob	Mexico	Runner-up	1
2002	Eric Hosking Award	Vincent Munier	France	Winner	6
2002	From Dusk to Dawn	Daniel Magnin	France	Winner	1
2002	From Dusk to Dawn	Chris Gomersall	United Kingdom	Runner-up	1
2002	Gerard Durrell Award for Endangered Wildlife	Michael Patrick O'Neill	United States/Brazil	Winner	1
2002	Gerard Durrell Award for Endangered Wildlife	Tim Laman	United States	Runner-up	1
2002	In Praise of Plants	Peter Lilja	Sweden	Winner	1
2002	In Praise of Plants	Wendy Shattil and Bob Rozinski	United States	Specially commended	1
2002	In Praise of Plants	George Stocking	United States	Runner-up	1
2002	Innovation Award	Per-Olov Eriksson	Sweden	Winner	1
2002	The Underwater World	Doug Allan	United Kingdom	Winner	1
2002	The Underwater World	Kelvin Aitken	Australia	Specially commended	1
2002	The Underwater World	Malcolm Hey	United Kingdom	Runner-up	1
2002	The World in Our Hands	Michael Nichols	United States	Winner	1
2002	The World in Our Hands	John Cancalosi	United States	Specially commended	1
2002	The World in Our Hands	Stephen McDaniel	United States	Runner-up	1
2002	Young Wildlife Photographer of the Year, The RSPB Wildlife Explorers Award - Close to Home	Dan Slootmaekers	Belgium	Winner - The RSPB Wildlife Explorers Award - Close to Home	1
2002	Young Wildlife Photographer of the Year: 10 years and under	Maximilian Hahl	Germany	Winner	1
2002	Young Wildlife Photographer of the Year: 10 years and under	Maximilian Hahl	Germany	Runner-up	1
2002	Young Wildlife Photographer of the Year: 11–14 years	Fanie Weldhagen	South Africa	Winner	1
2002	Young Wildlife Photographer of the Year: 11–14 years	Oliver Kois	Germany	Runner-up	1
2002	Young Wildlife Photographer of the Year: 15–17 years	Bence Máté	Hungary	Winner	1
2002	Young Wildlife Photographer of the Year: 15–17 years	David Scott	Kenya	Runner-up	1
2003	2003 Wildlife Photographer of the Year grand title	Gerhard Schulz	Germany	Winner	1
2003	2003 Young Wildlife Photographer of the Year grand title	Iwan Fletcher	United Kingdom	Winner	1
2003	Animal Behaviour - Birds	Nick Oliver	United Kingdom	Winner	1
2003	Animal Behaviour - Birds	Rob Jordan	United Kingdom	Runner-up	1
2003	Animal Behaviour - Mammals	André Cloete	South Africa	Winner	1
2003	Animal Behaviour - Mammals	Howie Garber	United States	Specially commended	1
2003	Animal Behaviour - Mammals	Eric Draqesco	France	Runner-up	1
2003	Animal Portraits	Helmut Moik	Germany	Winner	1
2003	Animal Portraits	Jeremy Woodhouse	United States	Runner-up	1
2003	Animals in Their Environment	Jean-Pierre Zwaenepoel	Belgium	Winner	1
2003	Animals in Their Environment	Jean-Pierre Lahall	Sweden	Specially commended	1
2003	Animals in Their Environment	Olivier Grunewald	France	Runner-up	1
2003	Composition and Form	David W Breed	United Kingdom	Winner	1
2003	Composition and Form	Herb Eighmy	United States	Runner-up	1
2003	Eric Hosking Award	Frédéric Larrey	France	Winner	6
2003	From Dusk to Dawn	José B Ruiz	Spain	Winner	1
2003	From Dusk to Dawn	Urs Lüthi	Switzerland	Specially commended	1
2003	From Dusk to Dawn	Theo Allofs	Germany	Runner-up	1
2003	Gerard Durrell Award for Endangered Wildlife	Michael Nichols	United States	Winner	1
2003	Gerard Durrell Award for Endangered Wildlife	Nick Garbutt	United Kingdom	Specially commended	1
2003	Gerard Durrell Award for Endangered Wildlife	Stefano Unterthiner	Italy	Runner-up	1
2003	In Praise of Plants	Stig-Erik Eriksson	Sweden	Winner	1
2003	In Praise of Plants	Urs Lüthi	Switzerland	Specially commended	1
2003	In Praise of Plants	Maurizio Valentini	Italy	Runner-up	1
2003	Innovation Award	José B Ruiz	Spain	Winner	1
2003	The Underwater World	Manu San Félix	Spain	Winner	1
2003	The Underwater World	Pete Atkinson	United Kingdom	Runner-up	1
2003	The World in Our Hands	Gerhard Schulz	Germany	Winner	1
2003	The World in Our Hands	Magnus Elander	Sweden	Specially commended	1
2003	The World in Our Hands	Joe McDonald	United States	Runner-up	1
2003	Urban and Garden Wildlife	Hannu Hautala	Finland	Winner	1
2003	Urban and Garden Wildlife	Gordon Illg	United States	Runner-up	1
2003	Wild Places	Ines Labunski Roberts	United Kingdom	Winner	1
2003	Wild Places	Hannu Kivelä	Finland	Runner-up	1
2003	Young Wildlife Photographer of the Year: 10 years and under	Joonas Lahti	Finland	Winner	1
2003	Young Wildlife Photographer of the Year: 10 years and under	Phillip Kois	Germany	Specially commended	1
2003	Young Wildlife Photographer of the Year: 10 years and under	Rhé Slootmaekers	Belgium	Runner-up	1
2003	Young Wildlife Photographer of the Year: 11–14 years	Olivia McMurray	South Africa	Winner	1
2003	Young Wildlife Photographer of the Year: 11–14 years	Olivia McMurray	South Africa	Runner-up	1
2003	Young Wildlife Photographer of the Year: 15–17 years	Iwan Fletcher	United Kingdom	Winner	1
2003	Young Wildlife Photographer of the Year: 15–17 years	Simon Hallais	France	Runner-up	1
2004	2004 Wildlife Photographer of the Year grand title	Doug Perrine	United States	Winner	1
2004	2004 Young Wildlife Photographer of the Year grand title	Gabby Salazar	United States	Winner	1
2004	Animal Behaviour - Birds	Jan Vermeer	The Netherlands	Winner	1
2004	Animal Behaviour - Mammals	Anup Shah	United Kingdom	Winner	1
2004	Animal Behaviour - Mammals	Johann C Mader	South Africa	Runner-up	1
2004	Animal Portraits	David Macri	United States	Winner	1
2004	Animal Portraits	Tore Hagman	Sweden	Specially commended	1
2004	Animal Portraits	Tui De Roy	New Zealand	Runner-up	1
2004	Animals in Their Environment	Howie Garber	United States	Winner	1
2004	Animals in Their Environment	Michel Rogge	Switzerland	Runner-up	1
2004	Behaviour - All Other Animals	Christian Ziegler	Germany	Winner	1
2004	Behaviour - All Other Animals	Taketomo Shiratori	Japan	Runner-up	1
2004	Composition and Form	Larry Michael	United States	Winner	1
2004	Composition and Form	Ulf Westerberg	Sweden	Runner-up	1
2004	Eric Hosking Award	Kobe van Looveren	Belgium	Winner	6
2004	From Dusk to Dawn	Peter Lilja	Sweden	Winner	1
2004	From Dusk to Dawn	Tui De Roy	New Zealand	Runner-up	1
2004	Gerard Durrell Award for Endangered Wildlife	Klaus Nigge	Germany	Winner	1
2004	Gerard Durrell Award for Endangered Wildlife	Hans Wolkers	The Netherlands	Runner-up	1
2004	In Praise of Plants	Bernard Castelein	Belgium	Winner	1
2004	Innovation Award	Pete Atkinson	United Kingdom	Winner	1
2004	The World in Our Hands	Trish Drury	United States	Winner	1
2004	Underwater World	Doug Perrine	United States	Winner	1
2004	Underwater World	Doug Perrine	United States	Runner-up	1
2004	Wild Places	Régis Cavignaux	France	Winner	1
2004	Young Wildlife Photographer of the Year: 10 years and under	Ville Ritonen	Finland	Winner	1
2004	Young Wildlife Photographer of the Year: 10 years and under	Nicholas Cancalosi Dean	United States	Runner-up	1
2004	Young Wildlife Photographer of the Year: 11–14 years	Fergus Gill	United Kingdom	Winner	1
2004	Young Wildlife Photographer of the Year: 11–14 years	Olivia McMurray	South Africa	Runner-up	1
2004	Young Wildlife Photographer of the Year: 15–17 years	Christoph Müller	Germany	Runner-up	1
2005	2005 Wildlife Photographer of the Year grand title	Manuel Presti	Italy	Winner	1
2005	2005 Young Wildlife Photographer of the Year grand title	Jesse Ritonen	Finland	Winner	1
2005	Animal Behaviour - Birds	Manuel Presti	Italy	Winner	1
2005	Animal Behaviour - Birds	Yossi Eshbol	Israel	Runner-up	1
2005	Animal Behaviour - Mammals	Kristin G Mosher	United States	Winner	1
2005	Animal Behaviour - Mammals	Elliot Neep	United Kingdom	Specially commended	1
2005	Animal Behaviour - Mammals	Thorstern Milse	Germany	Runner-up	1
2005	Animal Portraits	Alexander Mustard	United Kingdom	Winner	1
2005	Animal Portraits	Scott W Sharkey	United States	Specially commended	1
2005	Animal Portraits	Bence Máté	Hungary	Runner-up	1
2005	Animals in Their Environment	Martin Eisenhawer	Switzerland	Winner	1
2005	Animals in Their Environment	Sérgio Brant Rocha	Brazil	Runner-up	1
2005	Behaviour - All Other Animals	Ruben Smit	The Netherlands	Winner	1
2005	Behaviour - All Other Animals	Alexander Mustard	United Kingdom	Runner-up	1
2005	Composition and Form	Michel Loup	France	Winner	1
2005	Composition and Form	Lászkó Novák	Hungary	Specially commended	1
2005	Composition and Form	Alessandro Bee	Italy	Runner-up	1
2005	Eric Hosking Award	Bence Máté	Hungary	Winner	6
2005	Gerard Durrell Award for Endangered Wildlife	Martin Eisenhawer	Switzerland	Winner	1
2005	In Praise of Plants	Lászkó Novák	Hungary	Winner	1
2005	In Praise of Plants	Adam Gibbs	Canada	Runner-up	1
2005	Innovation Award	Michel Loup	France	Winner	1
2005	Nature in Black and White	Martyn Colbeck	United Kingdom	Winner	1
2005	Nature in Black and White	Martyn Colbeck	United Kingdom	Runner-up	1
2005	The Underwater World	George Duffield	United Kingdom	Winner	1
2005	The Underwater World	Charles Hood	United Kingdom	Specially commended	1
2005	The Underwater World	Magnus Lundgren	Sweden	Runner-up	1
2005	The World in Our Hands	Alessandro Bee	Italy	Winner	1
2005	The World in Our Hands	Erlend Haarberg	Norway	Runner-up	1
2005	Urban and Garden Wildlife	Julian Smith	New Zealand	Winner	1
2005	Urban and Garden Wildlife	Jean-Pierre Zwaenepoel	Belgium	Runner-up	1
2005	Wild Places	Staffan Widstrand	Sweden	Winner	1
2005	Wild Places	Olivier Grunewald	France	Runner-up	1
2005	Young Wildlife Photographer of the Year: 10 years and under	Jesse Ritonen	Finland	Winner	1
2005	Young Wildlife Photographer of the Year: 10 years and under	Marco Fantoni	Italy	Runner-up	1
2005	Young Wildlife Photographer of the Year: 11–14 years	Mart Smit	The Netherlands	Winner	1
2005	Young Wildlife Photographer of the Year: 11–14 years	Mart Smit	The Netherlands	Runner-up	1
2005	Young Wildlife Photographer of the Year: 15–17 years	Matthew Burrard-Lucas	United Kingdom	Winner	1
2005	Young Wildlife Photographer of the Year: 15–17 years	Mateusz Kowalski	Poland	Specially commended	1
2005	Young Wildlife Photographer of the Year: 15–17 years	Nicholas M Murphy	United States	Runner-up	1
2006	2006 Wildlife Photographer of the Year grand title	Göran Ehlmé	Sweden	Winner	1
2006	2006 Young Wildlife Photographer of the Year grand title	Rick Stanley	United States	Winner	1
2006	Animal Behaviour - Birds	Vincent Munier	France	Winner	1
2006	Animal Behaviour - Birds	Andy Rouse	United Kingdom	Specially commended	1
2006	Animal Behaviour - Birds	Bence Máté	Hungary	Specially commended	1
2006	Animal Behaviour - Birds	Solvin Zankl	Germany	Specially commended	1
2006	Animal Behaviour - Birds	Todd Gustafson	Sweden	Runner-up	1
2006	Animal Behaviour - Mammals	Göran Ehlmé	Sweden	Winner	1
2006	Animal Portraits	Tibor Dombovári	Hungary	Winner	1
2006	Animal Portraits	Edwin Giesbers	The Netherlands	Specially commended	1
2006	Animal Portraits	Bard Næss	Norway	Runner-up	1
2006	Animals in Their Environment	Jan Vermeer	The Netherlands	Winner	1
2006	Animals in Their Environment	Vincent Munier	France	Specially commended	1
2006	Animals in Their Environment	Cheryl Ertelt	United Kingdom	Runner-up	1
2006	Behaviour - All Other Animals	Andre Seale	Brazil / United States	Winner	1
2006	Behaviour - All Other Animals	Ross Hoddinott	United Kingdom	Runner-up	1
2006	Creative Visions of Nature	Juhani Kosonen	Finland	Winner	1
2006	Creative Visions of Nature	Jan Vermeer	The Netherlands	Runner-up	1
2006	Eric Hosking Award	Serkan Günes	Turkey/ Sweden	Winner	6
2006	Gerard Durrell Award for Endangered Wildlife	Stig Frode Olsen	Norway	Winner	1
2006	Gerard Durrell Award for Endangered Wildlife	Suzi Eszterhas	United States	Specially commended	1
2006	Gerard Durrell Award for Endangered Wildlife	Pete Oxford	United Kingdom	Runner-up	1
2006	In Praise of Plants	Dirk Heckmann	Germany	Winner	1
2006	The Underwater World	Michael AW	Singapore	Winner	1
2006	The Underwater World	Manu San Félix	Spain	Runner-up	1
2006	The World in Our Hands	Jocke Berglund	Sweden	Winner	1
2006	The World in Our Hands	Joe McDonald	United States	Runner-up	1
2006	Urban and Garden Wildlife	Igor Shpilenok	Russia	Winner	1
2006	Urban and Garden Wildlife	Fanus Weldhagen	South Africa	Specially commended	1
2006	Urban and Garden Wildlife	Klaus Echle	Germany	Runner-up	1
2006	Wild Places	Bernard van Dierendonck	The Netherlands	Winner	1
2006	Wild Places	Theo Allofs	Germany	Specially commended	1
2006	Wild Places	Jordi Chias	Spain	Runner-up	1
2006	Young Wildlife Photographer of the Year: 10 years and under	Nils Grundmann	Germany	Winner	1
2006	Young Wildlife Photographer of the Year: 10 years and under	Ilkka Räsänän	Finland	Specially commended	1
2006	Young Wildlife Photographer of the Year: 10 years and under	Ilkka Räsänän	Finland	Runner-up	1
2006	Young Wildlife Photographer of the Year: 11–14 years	Péter Kovács	Hungary	Winner	1
2006	Young Wildlife Photographer of the Year: 11–14 years	Alberto Fantoni	Italy	Specially commended	1
2006	Young Wildlife Photographer of the Year: 11–14 years	Adrien Imre	Hungary	Runner-up	1
2006	Young Wildlife Photographer of the Year: 15–17 years	Mateusz Kowalski	Poland	Specially commended	1
2006	Young Wildlife Photographer of the Year: 15–17 years	Mart Smit	The Netherlands	Runner-up	1
2007	2007 Wildlife Photographer of the Year grand title	Ben Osborne	United Kingdom	Winner	1
2007	2007 Young Wildlife Photographer of the Year grand title	Patrick Corning	United Kingdom	Winner	1
2007	Animal Portraits	Sergey Gorshkov	Russia	Winner	1
2007	Animal Portraits	Jürgen Freund	Australia	Specially commended	1
2007	Animal Portraits	Graham Eaton	United Kingdom	Runner-up	1
2007	Animals in Their Environment	Paul Nicklen	Canada	Winner	1
2007	Animals in Their Environment	Shane Rucker	United States	Specially commended	1
2007	Animals in Their Environment	Michael Nichols	United States	Runner-up	1
2007	Behaviour - All Other Animals	Amos Nachoum	Israel/ United States	Winner	1
2007	Behaviour - All Other Animals	Marguerite Fewkes	United Kingdom	Runner-up	1
2007	Behaviour - Birds	Louis-Marie Préau	France	Winner	1
2007	Behaviour - Birds	David Tipling	United Kingdom	Specially commended	1
2007	Behaviour - Birds	Kristin McCrea	Canada	Runner-up	1
2007	Behaviour - Mammals	Johan J Botha	South Africa	Winner	1
2007	Behaviour - Mammals	Anup Shah	United Kingdom	Specially commended	1
2007	Behaviour - Mammals	Shem Compion	South Africa	Specially commended	1
2007	Behaviour - Mammals	Christian Ziegler	Germany	Runner-up	1
2007	Creative Visions of Nature	Kurt Jay Bertels	South Africa	Specially commended	1
2007	Creative Visions of Nature	Laurent Baheux	France	Specially commended	1
2007	Creative Visions of Nature	Jan Vermeer	The Netherlands	Runner-up	1
2007	Eric Hosking Award	Bence Máté	Hungary	Winner	6
2007	Gerard Durrell Award for Endangered Wildlife	Roy Toft	United States	Winner	1
2007	Nature in Black and White	Thomas P Peschak	South Africa	Winner	1
2007	Nature in Black and White	Michel Denis-Huot	France	Runner-up	1
2007	One Earth Award	Csaba Karai	Hungary	Winner	1
2007	One Earth Award	Arnie Naevra	Norway	Runner-up	1
2007	The Underwater World	Felipe Barrio	Spain	Winner	1
2007	The Underwater World	Paul Nicklen	Canada	Specially commended	1
2007	The Underwater World	Paul Nicklen	Canada	Runner-up	1
2007	Urban and Garden Wildlife	Danny Green	United Kingdom	Winner	1
2007	Urban and Garden Wildlife	Jordi Bas Casas	Spain	Runner-up	1
2007	Wild Places	Robert Knight	United States	Winner	1
2007	Wild Places	Robert Sinclair	United States	Runner-up	1
2007	Young Wildlife Photographer of the Year: 10 years and under	Gregor Tims	United Kingdom	Specially commended	1
2007	Young Wildlife Photographer of the Year: 10 years and under	Tom Godwin	United Kingdom	Runner-up	1
2007	Young Wildlife Photographer of the Year: 11–14 years	Fergus Gill	United Kingdom	Winner	1
2007	Young Wildlife Photographer of the Year: 11–14 years	Jack Chapman	United Kingdom	Runner-up	1
2007	Young Wildlife Photographer of the Year: 15–17 years	Evan Graff	United States	Winner	1
2007	Young Wildlife Photographer of the Year: 15–17 years	Mark Fernley	United Kingdom	Runner-up	1
2008	2008 Wildlife Photographer of the Year grand title	Steve Winter	United States	Winner	1
2008	2008 Young Wildlife Photographer of the Year grand title	Catriona Parfitt	United Kingdom	Winner	1
2008	Animal Portraits	Stefano Unterthiner	Italy	Winner	1
2008	Animal Portraits	Adriano Ebenriter	Brazil	Specially commended	1
2008	Animal Portraits	Bill Harbin	United States	Specially commended	1
2008	Animal Portraits	Carstern Braun	Germany	Specially commended	1
2008	Animal Portraits	Jordi Chias	Spain	Runner-up	1
2008	Animals in Their Environment	Yongkang Zhu	China	Winner	1
2008	Animals in Their Environment	Michael Lambie	Canada	Specially commended	1
2008	Animals in Their Environment	Brian Skerry	United States	Runner-up	1
2008	Behaviour - All Other Animals	David Maitland	United Kingdom	Winner	1
2008	Behaviour - All Other Animals	Adrian Hepworth	United Kingdom	Specially commended	1
2008	Behaviour - All Other Animals	Amos Nachoum	Israel/ United States	Runner-up	1
2008	Behaviour - Birds	Antoni Kasprzak	Poland	Winner	1
2008	Behaviour - Birds	Paul Hobson	United Kingdom	Specially commended	1
2008	Behaviour - Birds	Brian W Matthews	United Kingdom	Runner-up	1
2008	Behaviour - Mammals	Cyril Ruoso	France	Winner	1
2008	Behaviour - Mammals	Steve Winter	United States	Runner-up	1
2008	Creative Visions of Nature	Miguel Lasa	United Kingdom/ Spain	Winner	1
2008	Creative Visions of Nature	Michel Roggo	Switzerland	Runner-up	1
2008	Gerard Durrell Award for Endangered Wildlife	Steve Winter	United States	Winner	1
2008	Gerard Durrell Award for Endangered Wildlife	Steve Winter	United States	Specially commended	1
2008	Gerard Durrell Award for Endangered Wildlife	Steve Winter	United States	Specially commended	1
2008	Gerard Durrell Award for Endangered Wildlife	Stefano Unterthiner	Italy	Runner-up	1
2008	In Praise of Plants	Cece Fabbro	United States	Winner	1
2008	In Praise of Plants	Thierry Van Baelinghem	France	Specially commended	1
2008	In Praise of Plants	Fredrik Ehrenström	Sweden	Runner-up	1
2008	Nature in Black and White	Carlos Virgili	Spain	Winner	1
2008	Nature in Black and White	Guillaume Bily	France	Runner-up	1
2008	One Earth Award	David Maitland	United Kingdom	Winner	1
2008	One Earth Award	Ira Meyer	United States	Runner-up	1
2008	The Underwater World	Brian Skerry	United States	Winner	1
2008	The Underwater World	Brian Skerry	United States	Specially commended	1
2008	The Underwater World	Jordi Chias	Spain	Specially commended	1
2008	The Underwater World	Thomas P Peschak	South Africa	Specially commended	1
2008	The Underwater World	Brian Skerry	United States	Runner-up	1
2008	Urban and Garden Wildlife	Jamie McGregor Smith	United Kingdom	Winner	1
2008	Wild Places	Andy Biggs	United States	Winner	1
2008	Wild Places	Albert Froneman	South Africa	Specially commended	1
2008	Wild Places	Franz Josef Kovacs	Austria	Runner-up	1
2008	Young Wildlife Photographer of the Year: 10 years and under	Alessandro Oggioni	Italy	Winner	1
2008	Young Wildlife Photographer of the Year: 10 years and under	Baptiste Drouet	France	Runner-up	1
2008	Young Wildlife Photographer of the Year: 11–14 years	Jean de Falandre	France	Winner	1
2008	Young Wildlife Photographer of the Year: 11–14 years	Caroline Christmann	United States	Specially commended	1
2008	Young Wildlife Photographer of the Year: 11–14 years	Martin Gregus	Slovakia/ Canada	Specially commended	1
2008	Young Wildlife Photographer of the Year: 11–14 years	Jesse Heikkinnen	Finland	Runner-up	1
2008	Young Wildlife Photographer of the Year: 15–17 years	Catriona Parfitt	United Kingdom	Winner	1
2008	Young Wildlife Photographer of the Year: 15–17 years	Tom Mills	United Kingdom	Specially commended	1
2008	Young Wildlife Photographer of the Year: 15–17 years	Matthias Blix	Norway	Runner-up	1
2009	2009 Wildlife Photographer of the Year grand title	José Luis Rodríguez	Spain	Winner	1
2009	2009 Young Wildlife Photographer of the Year grand title	Fergus Gill	United Kingdom	Winner	1
2009	Animal Portraits	José Luis Rodríguez	Spain	Winner	1
2009	Animal Portraits	Jérôme Guillaumot	France	Specially commended	1
2009	Animal Portraits	Kevin Schafer	United States	Specially commended	1
2009	Animal Portraits	Javi Montes	Spain	Runner-up	1
2009	Animal Portraits	Joe McDonald	United States	Runner-up	1
2009	Animal Portraits	Marc Slootmaekers	Belgium	Runner-up	1
2009	Animals in Their Environment	Urmas Tartes	Estonia	Winner	1
2009	Animals in Their Environment	Henrik Lund	Finland	Specially commended	1
2009	Animals in Their Environment	Floris van Breugel	United States	Runner-up	1
2009	Behaviour - All Other Animals	András Mészáros	Hungary	Winner	1
2009	Behaviour - All Other Animals	Chris van Rooyen	South Africa	Runner-up	1
2009	Behaviour - Birds	Rob Palmer	United States	Winner	1
2009	Behaviour - Birds	Thomas P Peschak	South Africa	Runner-up	1
2009	Behaviour - Mammals	Kevin Schafer	United States	Winner	1
2009	Behaviour - Mammals	Ajit K Huilgol	India	Runner-up	1
2009	Behaviour - Mammals	Morten Hilmer	Denmark	Runner-up	1
2009	Creative Visions of Nature	Esa Mälkönen	Finland	Winner	1
2009	Creative Visions of Nature	Ewald Neffe	Austria	Specially commended	1
2009	Creative Visions of Nature	Xavier Coulmier	France	Runner-up	1
2009	Gerard Durrell Award for Endangered Wildlife	Tom Schandy	Norway	Winner	1
2009	Gerard Durrell Award for Endangered Wildlife	Juan Carlos Muñoz	Spain	Runner-up	1
2009	In Praise of Plants	Ana Retamero	Spain	Winner	1
2009	In Praise of Plants	Serge Tollari	France	Runner-up	1
2009	Nature in Black and White	Danny Green	United Kingdom	Winner	1
2009	Nature in Black and White	Daisy Gilardini	Switzerland	Specially commended	1
2009	Nature in Black and White	David Hackel and Michel Poinsignon	France	Runner-up	1
2009	One Earth Award	Thomas Haney	United States	Winner	1
2009	One Earth Award	Frédéric Larrey	France	Runner-up	1
2009	The Underwater World	Michel Loup	France	Winner	1
2009	The Underwater World	Alexander Safonov	Russia	Runner-up	1
2009	Urban and Garden Wildlife	Igor Shpilenok	Russia	Winner	1
2009	Wild Places	Carsten Egevang	Denmark	Winner	1
2009	Young Wildlife Photographer of the Year: 10 years and under	Ilkka Räsänän	Finland	Winner	1
2009	Young Wildlife Photographer of the Year: 10 years and under	Noam-Pierre Werlé	France	Runner-up	1
2009	Young Wildlife Photographer of the Year: 11–14 years	Sam Rowley	United Kingdom	Winner	1
2009	Young Wildlife Photographer of the Year: 11–14 years	Stephan Rolfes	Germany	Runner-up	1
2009	Young Wildlife Photographer of the Year: 15–17 years	Fergus Gill	United Kingdom	Winner	1
2009	Young Wildlife Photographer of the Year: 15–17 years	Jacek Kwiatkowski	Poland	Specially commended	1
2009	Young Wildlife Photographer of the Year: 15–17 years	Niko Pekonen	Finland	Runner-up	1
2010	2010 Wildlife Photographer of the Year grand title	Bence Máté	Hungary	Winner	1
2010	2010 Young Wildlife Photographer of the Year grand title	Fergus Gill	United Kingdom	Winner	1
2010	Animal Portraits	Eirik Grønningsæter	Norway	Winner	1
2010	Animal Portraits	Reto Puppetti	Switzerland	Specially commended	1
2010	Animal Portraits	Doug Brown	United States	Runner-up	1
2010	Animals in Their Environment	Jochen Schlenker	Germany	Winner	1
2010	Animals in Their Environment	Ben Cranke	South Africa/ United Kingdom	Runner-up	1
2010	Behaviour - All Other Animals	Pascal Kobeh	France	Winner	1
2010	Behaviour - All Other Animals	Florian Schulz	Germany	Runner-up	1
2010	Behaviour - Birds	Arto Juvonen	Finland	Winner	1
2010	Behaviour - Birds	Yossi Eshbol	Israel	Specially commended	1
2010	Behaviour - Birds	Jim Neiger	United States	Runner-up	1
2010	Behaviour - Mammals	Bridgena Barnard	South Africa	Winner	1
2010	Behaviour - Mammals	Jean-Michel Lenoir	France	Runner-up	1
2010	Creative Visions of Nature	Francisco Mingorance	Spain	Winner	1
2010	Creative Visions of Nature	Tim Laman	United States	Specially commended	1
2010	Creative Visions of Nature	Sandra Bartocha	Germany	Runner-up	1
2010	Eric Hosking Award	Bence Máté	Hungary	Winner	6
2010	Gerard Durrell Award for Endangered Wildlife	Andy Rouse	United Kingdom	Winner	1
2010	In Praise of Plants	Frédéric Demeuse	Belgium	Winner	1
2010	In Praise of Plants	Francisco Mingorance	Spain	Specially commended	1
2010	In Praise of Plants	Peter Cairns	United Kingdom	Runner-up	1
2010	Nature in Black and White	Antonio Busiello	Italy	Winner	1
2010	Nature in Black and White	Nilanjan Das	India	Runner-up	1
2010	One Earth Award	Jordi Chias Pujol	Spain	Winner	1
2010	One Earth Award	Steve Winter	United States	Specially commended	1
2010	One Earth Award	Daniel Beltrá	Spain	Runner-up	1
2010	Underwater World	Tony Wu	United States	Winner	1
2010	Underwater World	Michel Roggo	Switzerland	Runner-up	1
2010	Wild Places	Maurizio Biancarelli	Italy	Winner	1
2010	Wild Places	Verena Pop-Hackner	Austria	Specially commended	1
2010	Wild Places	Kah Kit Yoong	Australia	Runner-up	1
2010	Wildlife Photojournalist of the Year Award	Mark Leong	United States	Winner	6
2010	Wildlife Photojournalist of the Year Award	Kai Fagerström	Finland	Specially commended	6
2010	Wildlife Photojournalist of the Year Award	Brian Skerry	United States	Runner-up	6
2010	Young Wildlife Photographer of the Year: 10 years and under	Haijun Pei	China	Winner	1
2010	Young Wildlife Photographer of the Year: 10 years and under	Will Jenkins	United Kingdom	Runner-up	1
2010	Young Wildlife Photographer of the Year: 11–14 years	Martin Gregus jr. In book	Canada/ Slovakia	Winner	1
2010	Young Wildlife Photographer of the Year: 11–14 years	Sam Cairns	United Kingdom	Runner-up	1
2010	Young Wildlife Photographer of the Year: 15–17 years	Fergus Gill	United Kingdom	Winner	1
2010	Young Wildlife Photographer of the Year: 15–17 years	Jack Chapman	United Kingdom	Specially commended	1
2010	Young Wildlife Photographer of the Year: 15–17 years	Michal Budzyński	Poland	Runner-up	1
2011	2011 Wildlife Photographer of the Year grand title	Daniel Beltrá	Spain	Winner	1
2011	2011 Young Wildlife Photographer of the Year grand title	Mateusz Piesiak	Poland	Winner	1
2011	Animal Portraits	Marco Colombo	Italy	Winner	1
2011	Animal Portraits	Stefano Unterthiner	Italy	Specially commended	1
2011	Animal Portraits	Klaus Echle	Germany	Runner-up	1
2011	Animals in Their Environment	Benjam Pöntinen	Finland	Winner	1
2011	Animals in Their Environment	Ole Jørgen Liodden	Norway	Specially commended	1
2011	Animals in Their Environment	Erlend Haarberg	Norway	Runner-up	1
2011	Behaviour - All Other Animals	Cyril Ruoso	France	Winner	1
2011	Behaviour - Birds	Steve Mills	United Kingdom	Winner	1
2011	Behaviour - Birds	Thomas Hanahoe	United Kingdom	Specially commended	1
2011	Behaviour - Birds	Jan van der Greef	The Netherlands	Runner-up	1
2011	Behaviour - Mammals	Joe Bunni	France	Winner	1
2011	Behaviour - Mammals	Richard Herrmann	United States	Runner-up	1
2011	Creative Visions of Nature	Stefano Unterthiner	Italy	Winner	1
2011	Creative Visions of Nature	Marc McCormack	Australia	Specially commended	1
2011	Creative Visions of Nature	Ole Jørgen Liodden	Norway	Joint Runner-up	1
2011	Creative Visions of Nature	Robert Cave	United Kingdom	Joint Runner-up	1
2011	Eric Hosking Award	Bence Máté	Hungary	Winner	6
2011	Gerard Durrell Award for Endangered Wildlife	Peter Chadwick	South Africa	Winner	1
2011	Gerard Durrell Award for Endangered Wildlife	Cyril Ruoso	France	Specially commended	1
2011	In Praise of Plants and Fungi	Sandra Bartocha	Germany	Winner	1
2011	In Praise of Plants and Fungi	David Maitland	United Kingdom	Specially commended	1
2011	In Praise of Plants and Fungi	Daniel Jara	Spain	Runner-up	1
2011	Nature in Black and White	Peter Delaney	Ireland	Winner	1
2011	Nature in Black and White	David Lloyd	New Zealand	Specially commended	1
2011	Nature in Black and White	Adithya Biloor	India	Runner-up	1
2011	Underwater World	Paul Souders	United States	Winner	1
2011	Underwater World	Clark Miller	United States	Specially commended	1
2011	Underwater World	Paul Souders	United States	Runner-up	1
2011	Urban Wildlife	Alexander Badyaev	United States	Winner	1
2011	Urban Wildlife	Thomas P Peschak	Germany/ South Africa	Runner-up	1
2011	Wild Places	Stephane Vetter	France	Winner	1
2011	Wild Places	Marsel van Oosten	The Netherlands	Specially commended	1
2011	Wild Places	Denis Butkov	Russia	Runner-up	1
2011	Wildlife Photojournalist of the Year Award	Daniel Beltrá	Spain	Winner	6
2011	Young Wildlife Photographer of the Year: 10 years and under	Hui Yu Kim	Malaysia	Winner	1
2011	Young Wildlife Photographer of the Year: 10 years and under	Corentin Graillot Denaix	France	Runner-up	1
2011	Young Wildlife Photographer of the Year: 11–14 years	Mateusz Piesiak	Poland	Winner	1
2011	Young Wildlife Photographer of the Year: 11–14 years	Joe Sulik	United States	Specially commended	1
2011	Young Wildlife Photographer of the Year: 11–14 years	Sander Broström	Sweden	Runner-up	1
2011	Young Wildlife Photographer of the Year: 15–17 years	Jack Salzke	Australia	Winner	1
2011	Young Wildlife Photographer of the Year: 15–17 years	Jamie Unwin	United Kingdom	Runner-up	1
2012	2012 Wildlife Photographer of the Year grand title	Paul Nicklen	Canada	Winner	1
2012	2012 Young Wildlife Photographer of the Year grand title	Owen Hearn	United Kingdom	Winner	1
2012	Animal Portraits	Larry Lynch	United States	Winner	1
2012	Animal Portraits	John E Marriott	Canada	Runner-up	1
2012	Animals in Their Environment	Ole Jørgen Liodden	Norway	Winner	1
2012	Animals in Their Environment	Paul Nicklen	Canada	Specially commended	1
2012	Animals in Their Environment	Hannes Lochner	South Africa	Runner-up	1
2012	Behaviour - Birds	Paul Nicklen	Canada	Winner	1
2012	Behaviour - Birds	Cristóbal Serrano	Spain	Runner-up	1
2012	Behaviour - Cold-blooded Animals	Luciano Candisani	Brazil	Winner	1
2012	Behaviour - Mammals	Grégoire Bouguereau	France	Winner	1
2012	Behaviour - Mammals	Jenny E Ross	United States	Specially commended	1
2012	Behaviour - Mammals	Kimmo P Pöri	Finland	Runner-up	1
2012	Botanical Realms	Glenn Upton-Fletcher	United Kingdom	Winner	1
2012	Creative Visions	Klaus Nigge	Germany	Winner	1
2012	Creative Visions	Sandra Bartocha	Germany	Specially commended	1
2012	Creative Visions	David Maitland	United Kingdom	Runner-up	1
2012	Eric Hosking Portfolio Award	Vladimir Medvedev	Russia	Winner	6
2012	Gerard Durrell Award for Endangered Wildlife	Kim Wolhuter	South Africa	Winner	1
2012	Gerard Durrell Award for Endangered Wildlife	Ofer Levy	Israel/ Australia	Specially commended	1
2012	Gerard Durrell Award for Endangered Wildlife	Steve Winter	United States	Runner-up	1
2012	Nature in Black and White	Robert Zoehrer	Austria	Winner	1
2012	Nature in Black and White	Charlie Hamilton James	United Kingdom	Specially commended	1
2012	Nature in Black and White	Remo Savissar	Estonia	Runner-up	1
2012	The World in Our Hands	Anna Henley	United Kingdom	Winner	1
2012	The World in Our Hands	Jabruson	United Kingdom	Specially commended	1
2012	The World in Our Hands	David Chancellor	United Kingdom	Runner-up	1
2012	Underwater Worlds	Paul Nicklen	Canada	Winner	1
2012	Underwater Worlds	Claudio Gazzaroli	Switzerland	Specially commended	1
2012	Urban Wildlife	Kai Fagerström	Finland	Winner	1
2012	Urban Wildlife	Alexander Badyaev	Russia/ United States	Specially commended	1
2012	Urban Wildlife	Pål Hermansen	Norway	Runner-up	1
2012	Wildlife Photojournalist Award	Steve Winter	United States	Winner	6
2012	Wildlife Photojournalist Award	Brent Stirton	South Africa	Runner-up	6
2012	Wildscapes	Thilo Bubek	Germany	Winner	1
2012	Wildscapes	Fortunato Gatto	Italy	Specially commended	1
2012	Wildscapes	Magnus Carlsson	Sweden	Runner-up	1
2012	Young Wildlife Photographer of the Year: 10 years and under	Bartek Kosiński	Poland	Winner	1
2012	Young Wildlife Photographer of the Year: 10 years and under	Liina Heikkinen	Finland	Runner-up	1
2012	Young Wildlife Photographer of the Year: 11–14 years	Owen Hearn	United Kingdom	Winner	1
2012	Young Wildlife Photographer of the Year: 11–14 years	Joshua Burch	United Kingdom	Runner-up	1
2012	Young Wildlife Photographer of the Year: 15–17 years	Eve Tucker	United Kingdom	Winner	1
2012	Young Wildlife Photographer of the Year: 15–17 years	Brieuc Graillot Denaix	France	Specially commended	1
2012	Young Wildlife Photographer of the Year: 15–17 years	Daniel Eggert	Germany	Runner-up	1
2013	2013 Wildlife Photographer of the Year grand title	Greg du Toit	South Africa	Winner	1
2013	2013 Young Wildlife Photographer of the Year grand title	Udayan Rao Pawar	India	Winner	1
2013	Animal Portraits	Greg du Toit	South Africa	Winner	1
2013	Animal Portraits	Hannes Lochner	South Africa	Joint Runner-up	1
2013	Animal Portraits	Peter Delaney	Ireland	Joint Runner-up	1
2013	Animals in Their Environment	Paul Souders	United States	Winner	1
2013	Animals in Their Environment	Alessandro Bee	Italy	Specially commended	1
2013	Animals in Their Environment	Wim van der Heever	South Africa	Runner-up	1
2013	Behaviour - Birds	Isak Pretorius	South Africa	Winner	1
2013	Behaviour - Birds	Charlie Hamilton James	United Kingdom	Runner-up	1
2013	Behaviour - Cold-blooded Animals	Louis Javier Sandoval	Mexico	Winner	1
2013	Behaviour - Cold-blooded Animals	Julian Cohen	United Kingdom/ Australia	Runner-up	1
2013	Behaviour - Mammals	Joe McDonald	United States	Winner	1
2013	Behaviour - Mammals	Valter Bernardeschi	Italy	Specially commended	1
2013	Behaviour - Mammals	Andrew Walmsley	United Kingdom	Runner-up	1
2013	Botanical Realms	Michael 'Nick' Nichols	United States	Winner	1
2013	Creative Visions	Jasper Doest	The Netherlands	Winner	1
2013	Creative Visions	Theo Bosboom	South Africa	Runner-up	1
2013	Eric Hosking Portfolio Award	Connor Stefanison	Canada	Winner	5
2013	Gerard Durrell Award for Endangered Wildlife	Toshiji Fukuda	Japan	Winner	1
2013	Gerard Durrell Award for Endangered Wildlife	Valeriy Maleev	Russia	Runner-up	1
2013	Nature in Black and White	Richard Packwood	United Kingdom	Winner	1
2013	Nature in Black and White	Andrew Schoeman	South Africa	Runner-up	1
2013	The World in Our Hands	Mike Veitch	Canada	Winner	1
2013	The World in Our Hands	Thomas P Peschak	Germany/ South Africa	Specially commended	1
2013	The World in Our Hands	Garth Lenz	Canada	Runner-up	1
2013	Underwater Worlds	Brian Skerry	United States	Winner	1
2013	Underwater Worlds	Jordi Chias Pujol	Spain	Specially commended	1
2013	Underwater Worlds	Solvin Zankl	Germany	Specially commended	1
2013	Underwater Worlds	Alex Tattersall	United Kingdom	Runner-up	1
2013	Urban Wildlife	Pål Hermansen	Norway	Winner	1
2013	Urban Wildlife	Stanislao Basileo	Italy	Runner-up	1
2013	Wildlife Photojournalist Award	Brent Stirton	South Africa	Winner	6
2013	Wildlife Photojournalist Award	Daniel Beltrá	Spain/ United States	Runner-up	6
2013	Wildscapes	Sergey Gorshkov	Russia	Winner	1
2013	Wildscapes	Adam Gibbs	United Kingdom	Specially commended	1
2013	Wildscapes	Ellen Anon	United States	Runner-up	1
2013	Young Wildlife Photographers: 10 years and under	Louis Pattyn	Belgium	Winner	1
2013	Young Wildlife Photographers: 10 years and under	Lasse Kurkela	Finland	Specially commended	1
2013	Young Wildlife Photographers: 10 years and under	Lasse Kurkela	Finland	Specially commended	1
2013	Young Wildlife Photographers: 10 years and under	Advaitesha Birla	India	Runner-up	1
2013	Young Wildlife Photographers: 11–14 years old	Udayan Rao Pawar	India	Winner	1
2013	Young Wildlife Photographers: 15–17 years old	Mateusz Piesiak	Poland	Winner	1
2013	Young Wildlife Photographers: 15–17 years old	Sander Broström	Sweden	Specially commended	1
2013	Young Wildlife Photographers: 15–17 years old	Etienne Francey	Switzerland	Runner-up	1
2014	2014 Wildlife Photographer of the Year grand title	Michael 'Nick' Nichols	United States	Winner	1
2014	2014 Young Wildlife Photographer of the Year grand title	Carlos Perez Naval	Spain	Winner	1
2014	Amphibians and Reptiles	Raviprakash S S	India	Winner	1
2014	Birds	Bence Máté	Hungary	Winner	1
2014	Black and White	Michael 'Nick' Nichols in book	United States	Winner	1
2014	Earth's Environments	Francisco Negroni	Chile	Winner	1
2014	Intervertebrates	Ary Bassous	Brazil	Winner	1
2014	Mammals	Alexander Badyaev	Russia/ United States	Winner	1
2014	Natural Design	Patrik Bartuška	Czech Republic	Winner	1
2014	Plants and Fungi	Christian Vizl	Mexico	Winner	1
2014	The Rising Star Portfolio Award	Michel d'Oultremont	Belgium	Winner	6
2014	The TimeLapse Award	Paul Klaver	The Netherlands	Winner	1
2014	The Wildlife Photojournalist Award	Brent Stirton	South Africa	Winner	6
2014	Underwater Species	Indra Swari Wonowidjojo	Indonesia	Winner	1
2014	Wildlife Photographer of the Year Portfolio Award	Tim Laman	United States	Winner	6
2014	World in Our Hands	Bruno D'Amicis	Italy	Winner	1
2014	Young Wildlife Photographers: 10 years and under	Carlos Perez Naval	Spain	Winner	1
2014	Young Wildlife Photographers: 11–14 years old	Marc Albiac	Spain	Winner	1
2014	Young Wildlife Photographers: 15–17 years old	Anton Lilja	Sweden	Winner	1
2015	2015 Wildlife Photographer of the Year grand title	Don Gutoski	Canada	Winner	1
2015	2015 Young Wildlife Photographer of the Year grand title	Ondřej Pelánek	Czech Republic	Winner	1
2015	Amphibians and Reptiles	Edwin Giesbers	The Netherlands	Winner	1
2015	Birds	Amir Ben-Dov	Israel	Winner	1
2015	Black and White	Hermann Hirsch	Germany	Winner	1
2015	Details	Fran Rubia	Spain	Winner	1
2015	From the Sky	Pere Soler	Spain	Winner	1
2015	Impressions	Juan Tapia	Spain	Winner	1
2015	Intervertebrates	Ugo Mellone	Italy	Winner	1
2015	Land	Hans Strand	Sweden	Winner	1
2015	Mammals	Don Gutoski	Canada	Winner	1
2015	Plants	Georg Popp	Austria	Winner	1
2015	The Rising Star Portfolio Award	Connor Stefanison	Canada	Winner	6
2015	The TimeLapse Award	Tobias Bernhard Raff	Germany	Winner	1
2015	The Wildlife Photographer of the Year Portfolio Award	Audun Rikardsen	Norway	Winner	6
2015	The Wildlife Photojournalist Award: Single Image	Britta Jaschinski	Germany/ United Kingdom	Winner	1
2015	The Wildlife Photojournalist Award: Story	Brent Stirton	South Africa	Winner	6
2015	Under Water	Michael AW	Australia	Winner	1
2015	Urban	Richard Peters	United Kingdom	Winner	1
2015	Young Wildlife Photographers: 10 years and under	Carlos Perez Naval	Spain	Winner	1
2015	Young Wildlife Photographers: 11–14 years old	Ondřej Pelánek	Czech Republic	Winner	1
2015	Young Wildlife Photographers: 15–17 years old	Jonathan Jagot	France	Winner	1
2016	2016 Wildlife Photographer of the Year grand title	Tim Laman	United States	Winner	1
2016	2016 Young Wildlife Photographer of the Year grand title	Gideon Knight	United Kingdom	Winner	1
2016	Reptiles, Amphibians and Fish	Marco Colombo	Italy	Winner	1
2016	Intervertebrates	Angel Fitor	Spain	Winner	1
2016	Mammals	Simon Stafford	United Kingdom	Winner	1
2016	Birds	Ganesh H Shankar	India	Winner	1
2016	Land	Stefano Unterthiner	Italy	Winner	1
2016	Plants	Walter Binotto	Italy	Winner	1
2016	Urban	Nayan Khanolkar	India	Winner	1
2016	Black and White	Mats Andersson	Sweden	Winner	1
2016	Under Water	Tony Wu	United States	Winner	1
2016	Details	Rudi Sebastian	Germany	Winner	1
2016	Impressions	Luis Javier Sandoval	Mexico	Winner	1
2016	The Wildlife Photojournalist Award: Single Image	Paul Hilton	United Kingdom/ Australia	Winner	1
2016	The Wildlife Photojournalist Award: Story	Charlie Hamilton James	United Kingdom	Joint Winner	6
2016	The Wildlife Photojournalist Award: Story	Tim Laman	United States	Joint Winner	6
2016	Young Wildlife Photographers: 10 years and under	Carlos Perez Naval	Spain	Winner	1
2016	Young Wildlife Photographers: 11–14 years old	Louis Pattyn	Belgium	Winner	1
2016	Young Wildlife Photographers: 15–17 years old	Gideon Knight	United Kingdom	Winner	1
2017	2017 Wildlife Photographer of the Year grand title	Brent Stirton	South Africa	Winner	1
2017	2017 Young Wildlife Photographer of the Year grand title	Daniël Nelson	The Netherlands	Winner	1
2017	Animals in Their Environment	Marcio Cabral	Brazil	DISQUALIFIED - BARRED FROM COMPETITION FOR LIFE	1
2017	Animal Portraits	Peter Delaney	Ireland/ South Africa	Winner	1
2017	Behaviour: Amphibians and Reptiles	Brian Skerry	United States	Winner	1
2017	Behaviour: Birds	Gerry Pearce	United Kingdom/ Australia	Winner	1
2017	Behaviour: Invertebrates	Justin Gilligan	Australia	Winner	1
2017	Behaviour: Mammals	Tony Wu	United States	Winner	1
2017	Plants and Fungi	Dorin Bofan	Romania	Winner	1
2017	Under Water	Anthony Berberian	France	Winner	1
2017	Earth's Environments	Laurent Ballesta	France	Winner	1
2017	Black and White	Eilo Elvinger	Luxembourg	Winner	1
2017	The Wildlife Photojournalist Award: Single Image	Aaron 'Bertie' Gekoski	United Kingdom/ United States	Winner	1
2017	The Wildlife Photojournalist Award: Story	Brent Stirton	South Africa	Winner	6
2017	The Wildlife Photographer of the Year Portfolio Award	Thomas P Peschak	Germany/ South Africa	Winner	6
2017	Young Awards: 10 Years and Under	Ekaterina Bee	Italy	Winner	1
2017	Young Awards: 11 - 14 Years Old	Ashleigh Scully	United States	Winner	1
2017	Young Awards: 15 - 17 Years Old	Daniël Nelson	The Netherlands	Winner	1
2018	Wildlife Photographer of the Year grand title	Marsel van Oosten	The Netherlands	Winner	1
2018	Young Wildlife Photographer of the Year grand title	Skye Meaker	South Africa	Winner	1
2018	Animals in their Environment	Cristobal Serrano	Spain	Winner	1
2018	Animal Portraits	Marsel van Oosten	The Netherlands	Winner	1
2018	Behaviour: Amphibians and Reptiles	David Herasimtschuk	United States	Winner	1
2018	Behaviour: Birds	Thomas P Peschak	Germany / South Africa	Winner	1
2018	Behaviour: Invertebrates	Georgina Steytler	Australia	Winner	1
2018	Behaviour: Mammals	Ricardo Núñez Montero	Spain	Winner	1
2018	Plants and Fungi	Jen Guyton	Germany / United States	Winner	1
2018	Under Water	Michael Patrick O'Neill	United States	Winner	1
2018	Urban Wildlife	Marco Colombo	Italy	Winner	1
2018	Earth's Environments	Orlando Fernandez Miranda	Spain	Winner	1
2018	Black and White	Jan van der Greef	The Netherlands	Winner	1
2018	Creative Visions	Cristobal Serrano	Spain	Winner	1
2018	Wildlife Photojournalism	Joan de la Malla	Spain	Winner	1
2018	The Rising Star Portfolio Award	Michel d'Oultremont	Belgium	Winner	6
2018	The Wildlife Photojournalist Award: Story	Alejandro Prieto	Mexico	Winner	6
2018	Wildlife Photographer Portfolio Award	Javier Aznar González de Rueda	Spain	Winner	6
2018	Wildlife Photographer of the Year Lifetime Achievement Award	Frans Lanting	The Netherlands	Winner	5
2018	Special Award: LUMIX People's Choice Award	David Lloyd	New Zealand / United Kingdom	Winner	1
2018	Young Awards: 10 Years And Under	Arshdeep Singh	India	Winner	1
2018	Young Awards: 11 - 14 Years Old	Carlos Perez Naval	Spain	Winner	1
2018	Young Awards: 15 - 17 Years Old	Skye Meaker	South Africa	Winner	1
2019	Wildlife Photographer of the Year grand title	Bao Yongqing	China	Winner	1
2019	Young Wildlife Photographer of the Year grand title	Cruz Erdmann	New Zealand	Winner	1
2019	Animals in their Environment	Fan Zhangshen	China	Winner	1
2019	Animal Portraits	Ripan Biswas	India	Winner	1
2019	Behaviour: Amphibians and Reptiles	Manuel Plaickner	Italy	Winner	1
2019	Behaviour: Birds	Audun Rikardsen	Norway	Winner	1
2019	Behaviour: Invertebrates	Daniel Kronauer	Germany / United States	Winner	1
2019	Behaviour: Mammals	Ingo Arndt	Germany	Joint Winner	1
2019	Behaviour: Mammals	Bao Yongqing	China	Joint Winner	1
2019	Plants and Fungi	Zorica Kovacevic	Serbia / United States	Winner	1
2019	Under Water	David Doubilet	United States	Winner	1
2019	Urban Wildlife	Charlie Hamilton James	United Kingdom	Winner	1
2019	Earth's Environments	Luis Vilariño	Spain	Winner	1
2019	Black and White	Max Waugh	United States	Winner	1
2019	Wildlife Photojournalism	Alejandro Prieto	Mexico	Winner	1
2019	Wildlife Photojournalist Story Award	Jasper Doest	The Netherlands	Winner	6
2019	Rising Star Portfolio Award	Jérémie Villet	France	Winner	6
2019	Wildlife Photographer Portfolio Award	Stefan Christmann	Germany	Winner	6
2019	Young Award: 10 Years and Under	Thomas Easterbrook	United Kingdom	Winner	1
2019	Young Award: 11 - 14 Years Old	Cruz Erdmann	New Zealand	Winner	1
2019	Young Award: 15 - 17 Years Old	Riccardo Marchegiani	Italy	Winner	1
2019	People's Choice Award - Station Squabble	Sam Rowley	United Kingdom	Winner	1
2020	Wildlife Photographer of the Year grand title	Sergey Gorshkov	Russia	Winner	1
2020	Animal Portraits	Mogens Trolle	Denmark	Winner	1
2020	Behaviour: Amphibians and Reptiles	Jaime Culebras	Spain	Winner	1
2020	Behaviour: Birds	Jose Luis Ruiz Jiménez	Spain	Winner	1
2020	Behaviour: Invertebrates	Frank Deschandol	France	Winner	1
2020	Behaviour: Mammals	Shanyuan Li	China	Winner	1
2020	Earth's Environments	Luciano Gaudenzio	Italy	Winner	1
2020	Plants and Fungi	Gabriel Eisenband	Colombia	Winner	1
2020	Rising Star Portfolio Award	Alberto Fantoni	Italy	Winner	6
2020	Under Water	Songda Cai	China	Winner	1
2020	Urban Wildlife	Alex Badyaev	Russia / United States	Winner	1
2020	Wildlife Photojournalism	Kirsten Luce	United States	Winner	1
2020	Wildlife Photojournalist Story Award	Paul Hilton	United Kingdom / Australia	Winner	6
2020	Wildlife Photographer Portfolio Award	Ripan Biswas	India	Winner	6
2020	Young Award: 10 Years and Under	Andrés Luis Dominguez Blanco	Spain	Winner	1
2020	Young Award: 11 - 14 Years Old	Sam Sloss	Italy / United States	Winner	1
2020	Young Grand Title Winner 2020 Young Award: 15 - 17 Years Old	Liina Heikkinen	Finland	Winner	1
2020	People's Choice Award	Robert Irwin	Australia	Winner	1
2021	Wildlife Photographer of the Year grand title Under Water	Laurent Ballesta	France	Winner	1
2021	Animal Portraits	Majed Ali	Kuwait	Winner	1
2021	Behaviour: Amphibians and Reptiles	João Rodrigues	Portugal	Winner	1
2021	Behaviour: Birds	Shane Kalyn	Canada	Winner	1
2021	Behaviour: Invertebrates	Gil Wizen	Israel / Canada	Winner	1
2021	Behaviour: Mammals	Stefano Unterthiner	Italy	Winner	1
2021	Animals in their environment	Zack Clothier	United States	Winner	1
2021	Wetlands: the bigger picture	Javier Lafuente	Spain	Winner	1
2021	Oceans: the bigger picture	Jennifer Hayes	United States	Winner	1
2021	Plants and Fungi	Justin Gilligan	Australia	Winner	1
2021	Rising Star Portfolio Award	Martin Gregus	Canada / Slovakia	Winner	6
2021	Urban Wildlife	Gil Wizen	Israel / Canada	Winner	1
2021	Natural artistry	Alex Mustard	United Kingdom	Winner	1
2021	Photojournalism	Adam Oswell	Australia	Winner	1
2021	Photojournalist Story Award	Brent Stirton	South Africa	Winner	6
2021	Portfolio Award	Angel Fitor	Spain	Winner	6
2021	Young Grand Title Winner 2021 Young Award: 10 Years and Under	Vidyun R Hebbar	India	Winner	1
2021	Young Award: 11 - 14 Years Old	Andrés Luis Dominguez Blanco	Spain	Winner	1
2021	Young Award: 15 - 17 Years Old	Lasse Kurkela	Finland	Winner	1
2021	People's Choice Award	Cristiano Vendramin	Italy	Winner	1
2022	Young Award: 10 Years and Under	Joshua Cox	United Kingdom	Winner	1
2022	People's Choice Award: World of the Snow Leopard	Sascha Fonseca	Germany	Winner	1

== Bibliography ==
- Wilkinson, Peter; Helen Gilks (1992). Wildlife Photographer of the Year Portfolio One. Surbiton, Surrey: Fountain Press. ISBN 0-86343-395-2.
- Wildlife Photographer of the Year. London: BBC Books. 2006. ISBN 978-0-563-49384-6.
