= Outline of Belarus =

Landlocked country in Eastern Europe

The Flag of Belarus

The Coat of arms of Belarus

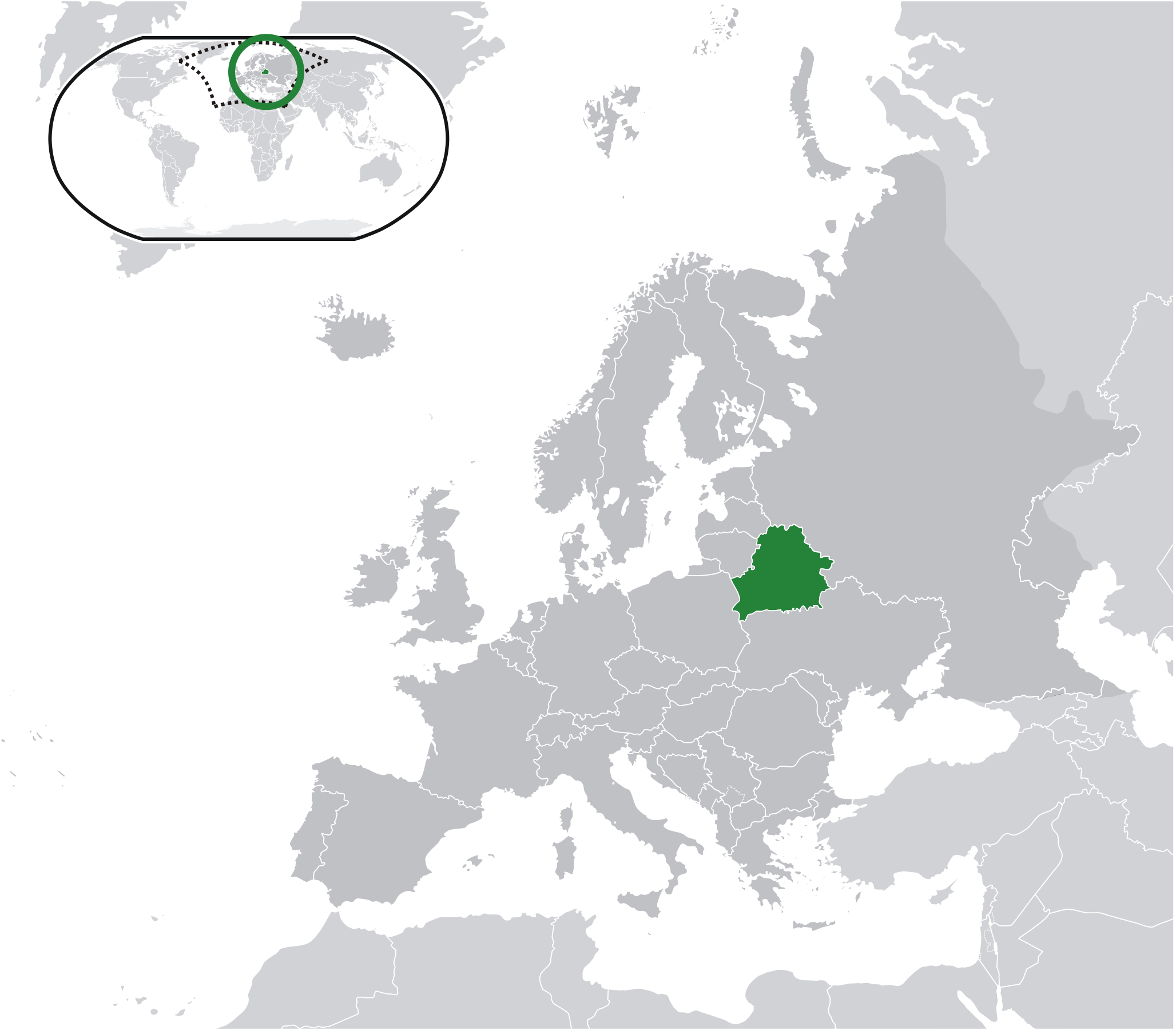
The location of Belarus

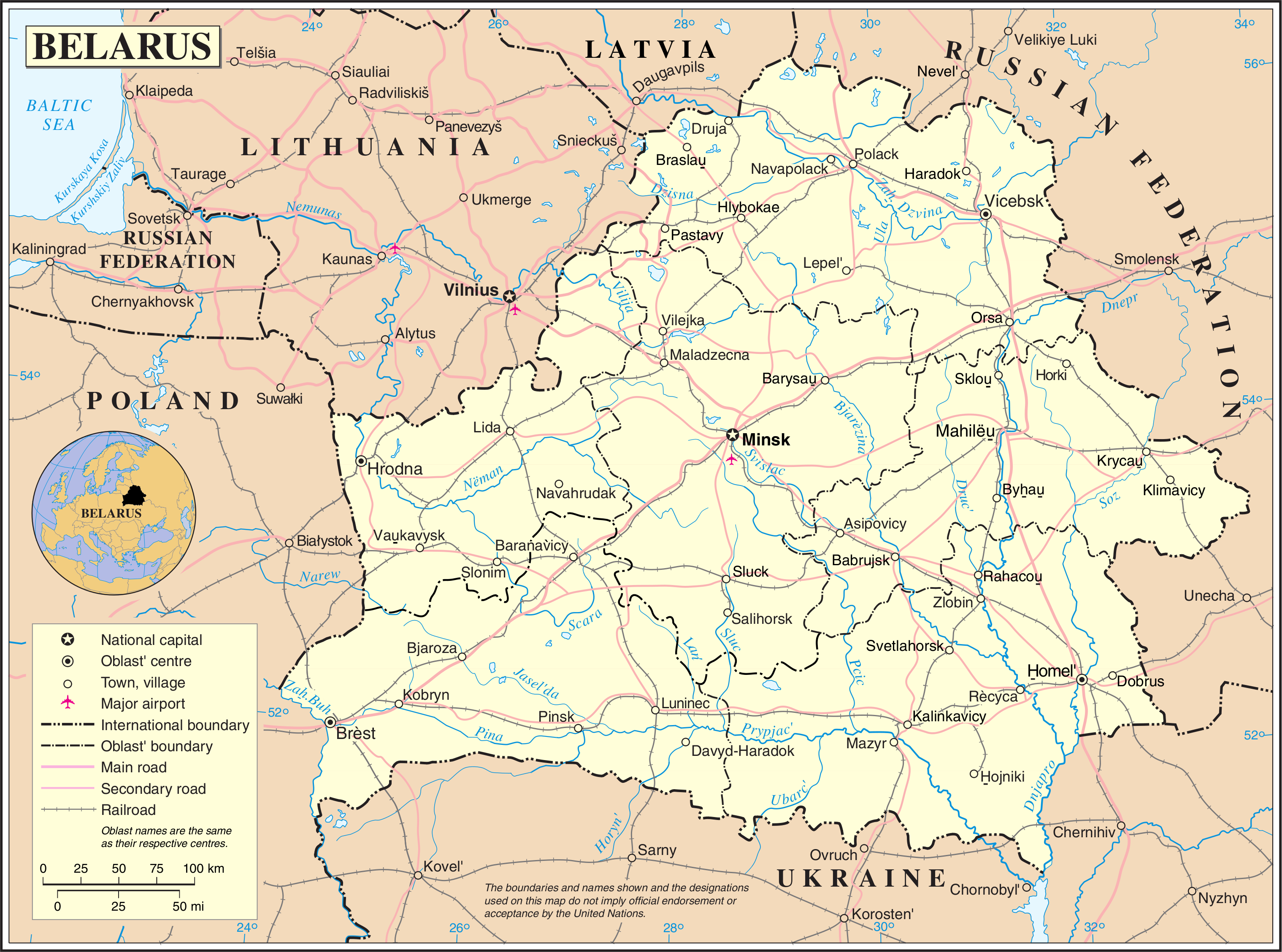
An enlargeable map of Belarus

The following outline is provided as an overview of and topical guide to Belarus:

Belarus is a landlocked country in Eastern Europe. Its strongest economic sectors are agriculture and manufacturing.

== General reference ==
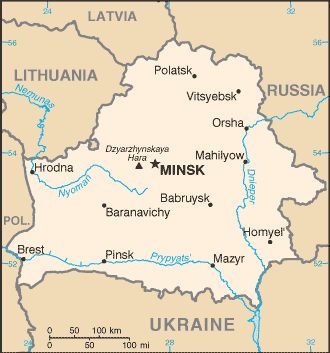
An enlargeable basic map of Belarus

- Pronunciation: /ˌbɛləˈruːs/ BEL-ə-ROOSS
- Common English country name: Belarus
- Official English country name: The Republic of Belarus
- Common endonym(s):
- Official endonym(s):
- Adjectival(s): Belarusian
- Demonym(s): Belarusian(s)
- Etymology: Name of Belarus
- International rankings of Belarus
- ISO country codes: BY, BLR, 112
- ISO region codes: See ISO 3166-2:BY
- Internet country code top-level domain: .by
- Internet Internationalized country code top-level domain: .бел

== Geography of Belarus ==
Geography of Belarus

- Belarus is: a landlocked country
- Location:
  - Northern Hemisphere and Eastern Hemisphere
  - Eurasia
    - Europe
      - Eastern Europe
  - Time zone: Eastern European Time (UTC+02), Eastern European Summer Time (UTC+03)
  - Extreme points of Belarus
    - High: Dzyarzhynskaya Hara 346 m (1,135 ft)
    - Low: Neman River 90 m (295 ft)
  - Land boundaries: 3,306 km

Russia 959 km
Ukraine 891 km
Lithuania 680 km
Poland 605 km
Latvia 171 km

- Coastline: none

- Population of Belarus: 9,255,524 (2022) - 98th most populous country
- Area of Belarus: 207,600 square kilometres (80,200 sq mi) - 85th largest country
- Atlas of Belarus

=== Environment of Belarus ===
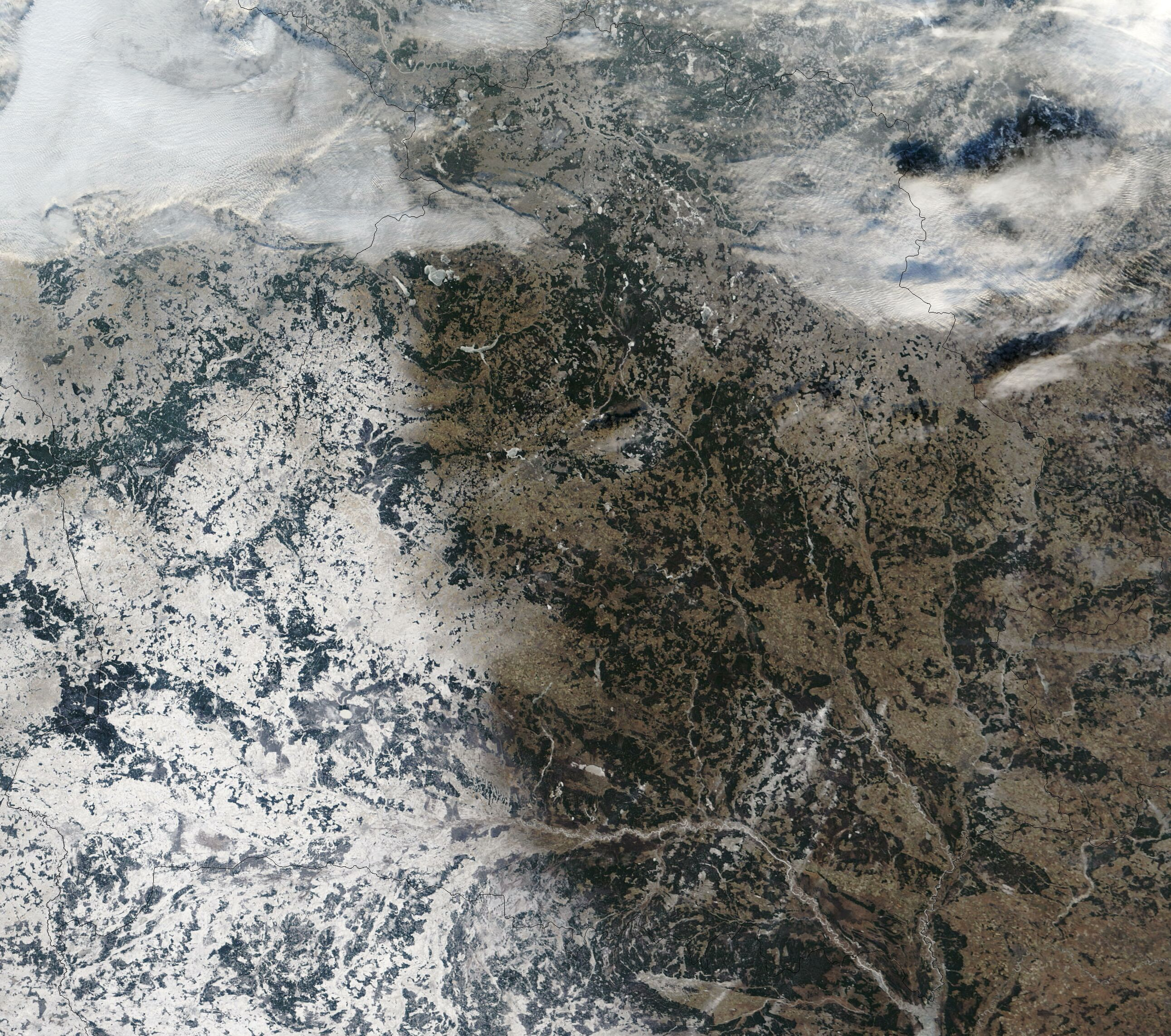
An enlargeable satellite image of Belarus

- Climate of Belarus
- Renewable energy in Belarus
- Geology of Belarus
- Protected areas of Belarus
  - Biosphere reserves in Belarus
  - National parks of Belarus
- Wildlife of Belarus
  - Fauna of Belarus
    - Birds of Belarus
    - Mammals of Belarus

==== Natural geographic features of Belarus ====
- Rivers of Belarus
- World Heritage Sites in Belarus

==== Administrative divisions of Belarus ====
- Provinces of Belarus
- Districts of Belarus

===== Regions of Belarus =====
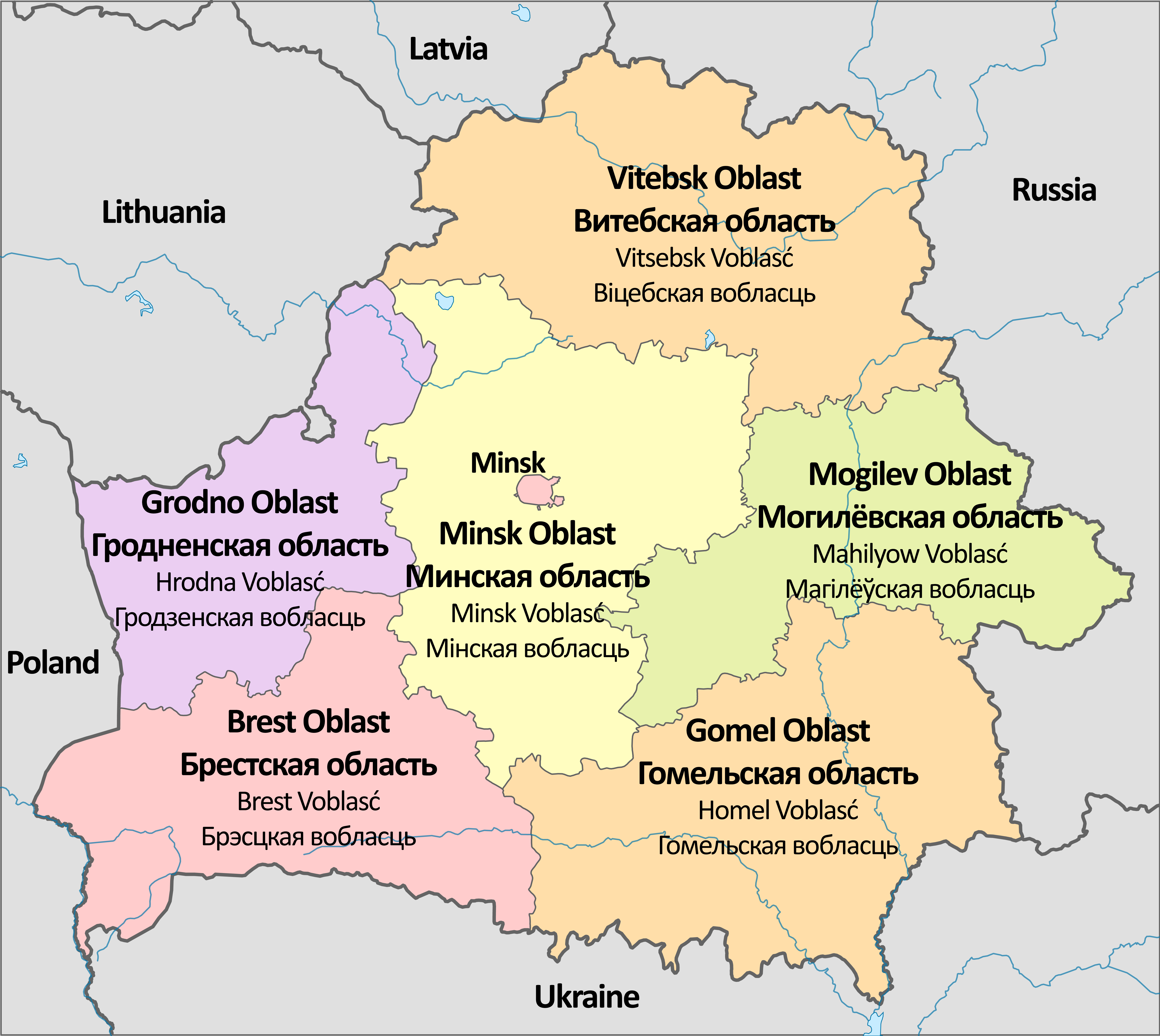

- Minsk
- Brest Oblast
- Gomel Oblast
- Grodno Oblast
- Mogilev Oblast
- Minsk Oblast
- Vitebsk Oblast

===== Districts of Belarus =====
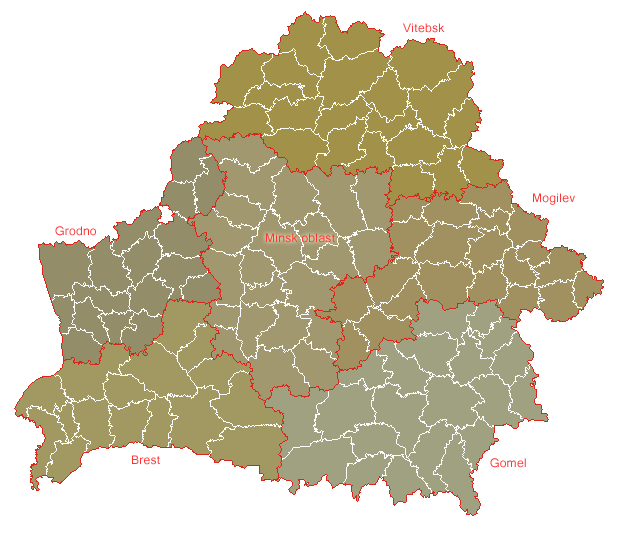

There are 118 districts in Belarus.

- List of cities and towns in Belarus
- List of urban-type settlements in Belarus
- Rural councils of Belarus

=== Demography of Belarus ===
Demographics of Belarus

== Government and politics of Belarus ==
- Form of government: presidential republic
- Capital of Belarus: Minsk
- Elections in Belarus
- Political parties in Belarus

=== Branches of government ===
Government of Belarus

==== Executive branch of the government of Belarus ====
- Head of state: President of Belarus, Alexander Lukashenko
- Head of government: Prime Minister of Belarus, Alexander Turchin
- Cabinet of Belarus

==== Legislative branch of the government of Belarus ====
- Parliament of Belarus (bicameral)
  - Upper house: Council of the Republic
  - Lower house: House of Representatives of Belarus

==== Judicial branch of the government of Belarus ====
Court system of Belarus

- Supreme Court of Belarus

=== Foreign relations of Belarus ===
Foreign relations of Belarus

- Diplomatic missions in Belarus
- Diplomatic missions of Belarus
- United States-Belarus relations

==== International organization membership ====
The Republic of Belarus is a member of:

- Black Sea Economic Cooperation Zone (BSEC) (observer)
- Central European Initiative (CEI)
- Collective Security Treaty Organization (CSTO)
- Commonwealth of Independent States (CIS)
- Eurasian Economic Community (EAEC)
- Euro-Atlantic Partnership Council (EAPC)
- European Bank for Reconstruction and Development (EBRD)
- Food and Agriculture Organization (FAO)
- General Confederation of Trade Unions (GCTU)
- International Atomic Energy Agency (IAEA)
- International Bank for Reconstruction and Development (IBRD)
- International Civil Aviation Organization (ICAO)
- International Criminal Police Organization (Interpol)
- International Development Association (IDA)
- International Federation of Red Cross and Red Crescent Societies (IFRCS)
- International Finance Corporation (IFC)
- International Labour Organization (ILO)
- International Mobile Satellite Organization (IMSO)
- International Monetary Fund (IMF)
- International Olympic Committee (IOC)
- International Organization for Migration (IOM)
- International Organization for Standardization (ISO)
- International Red Cross and Red Crescent Movement (ICRM)
- International Telecommunication Union (ITU)
- International Trade Union Confederation (ITUC)
- Inter-Parliamentary Union (IPU)
- Multilateral Investment Guarantee Agency (MIGA)
- Nonaligned Movement (NAM)
- Nuclear Suppliers Group (NSG)
- Organization for Security and Cooperation in Europe (OSCE)
- Organisation for the Prohibition of Chemical Weapons (OPCW)
- Partnership for Peace (PFP)
- Permanent Court of Arbitration (PCA)
- United Nations (UN)
- United Nations Conference on Trade and Development (UNCTAD)
- United Nations Educational, Scientific, and Cultural Organization (UNESCO)
- United Nations Industrial Development Organization (UNIDO)
- Universal Postal Union (UPU)
- World Customs Organization (WCO)
- World Federation of Trade Unions (WFTU)
- World Health Organization (WHO)
- World Intellectual Property Organization (WIPO)
- World Meteorological Organization (WMO)
- World Tourism Organization (UNWTO)
- World Trade Organization (WTO) (observer)

=== Law and order in Belarus ===
Law of Belarus

- Capital punishment in Belarus
- Constitution of Belarus
- Crime in Belarus
- Human rights in Belarus
  - Censorship in Belarus
  - LGBT rights in Belarus
  - Women in Belarus
  - Freedom of religion in Belarus
- Law enforcement in Belarus

=== Military of Belarus ===
Military of Belarus

- Command
  - Commander-in-chief: President of Belarus
    - Ministry of Defence of Belarus
- Forces
  - Army of Belarus
  - Navy of Belarus
  - Air Force of Belarus
  - Special Operations Forces of Belarus
  - Transport Troops of Belarus
  - Territorial Defense Troops of Belarus
- Military history of Belarus
- Military ranks of Belarus

=== Local government in Belarus ===
Local government in Belarus

== History of Belarus ==
History of Belarus

- Military history of Belarus

== Culture of Belarus ==
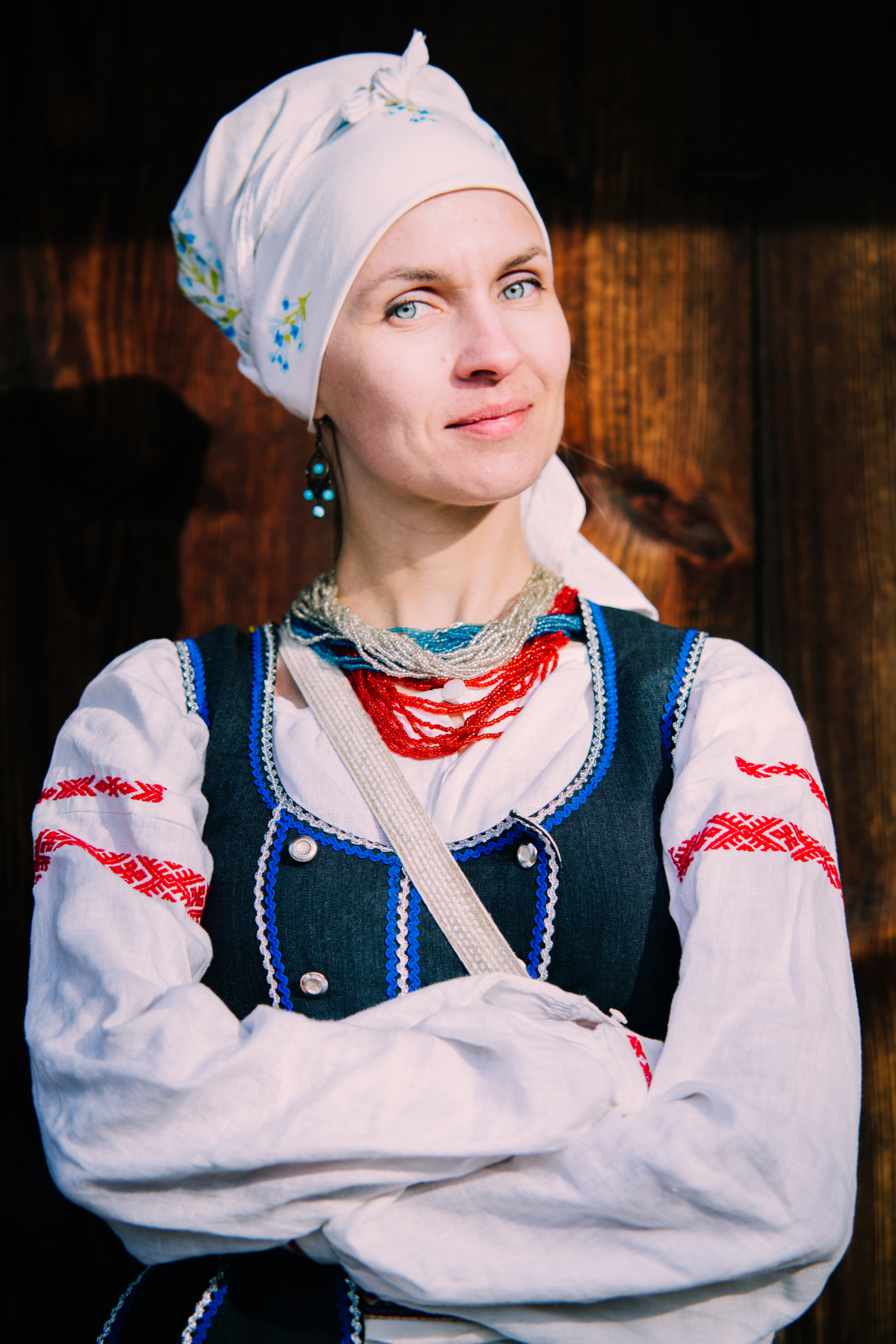
A woman in Belarusian dress

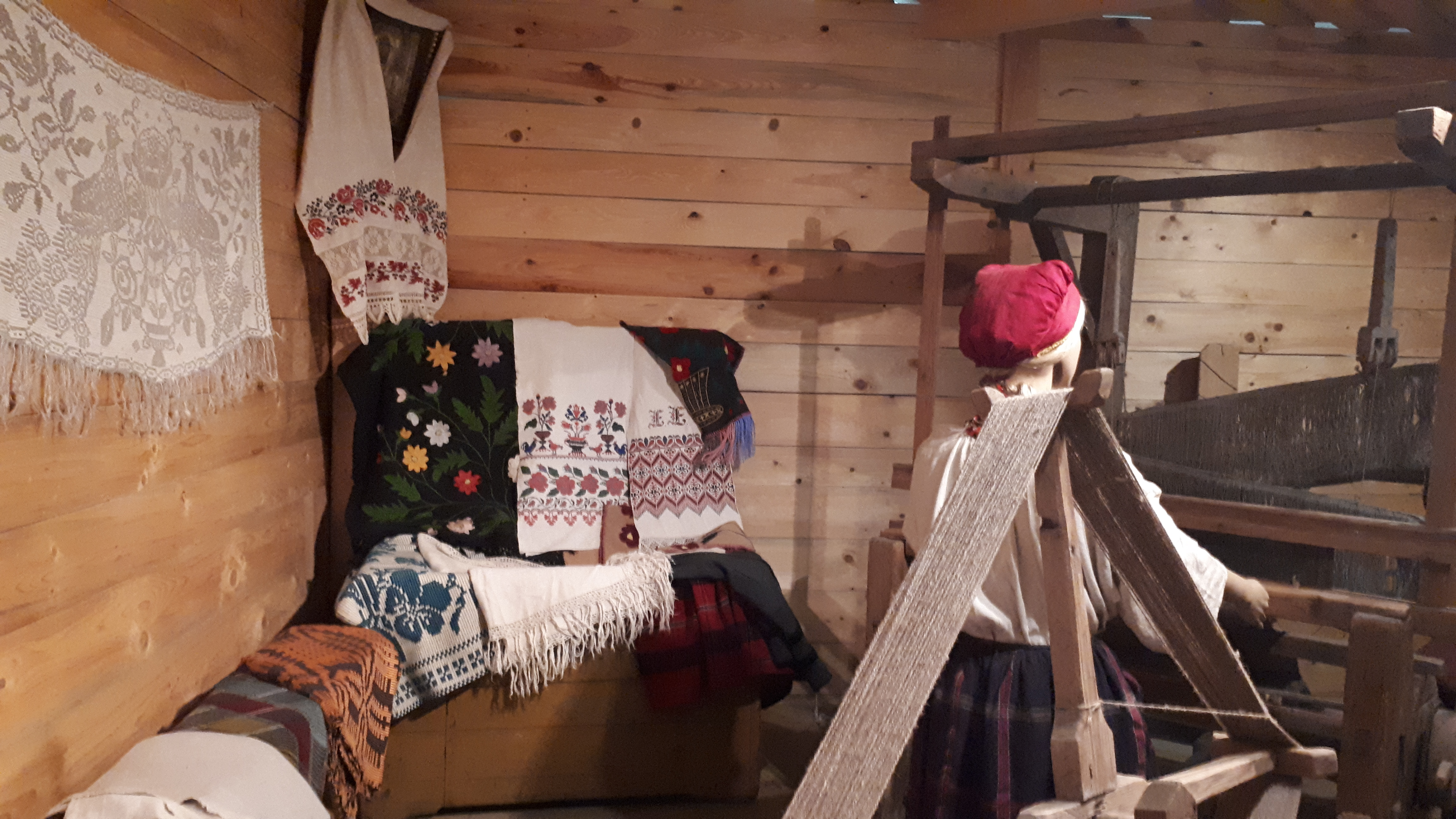
Traditional Belarusian house at Belarusian Culture Museum and Center in Hajnówka

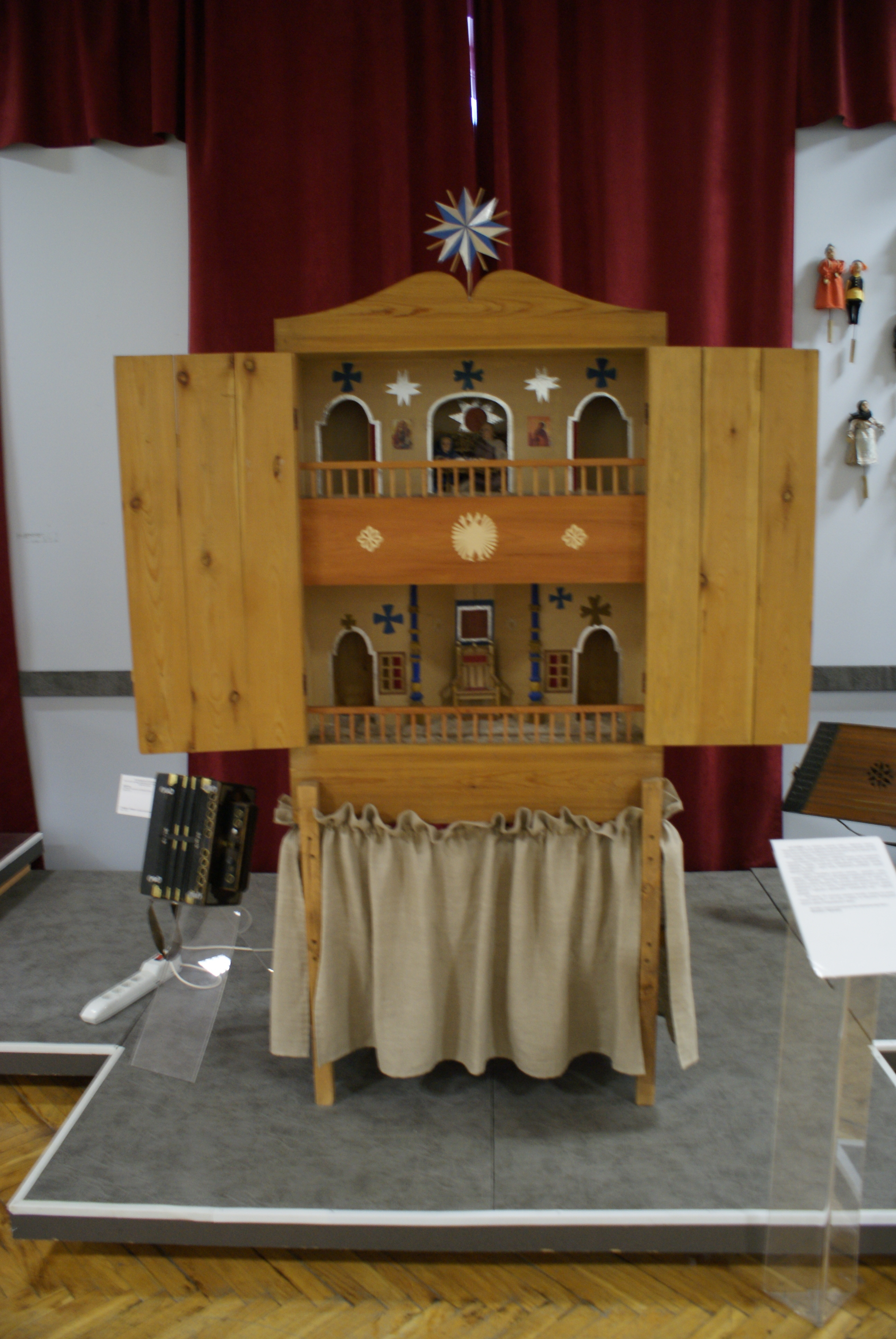
Batlejka booth in the Belarusian National History Museum

Culture of Belarus

- Architecture of Belarus
  - Belarusian Gothic
- Cuisine of Belarus
- Festivals in Belarus
- Languages of Belarus
- Media in Belarus
- Museums in Belarus
- National symbols of Belarus
  - Coat of arms of Belarus
  - Flag of Belarus
  - National anthem of Belarus
- People of Belarus
- Prostitution in Belarus
- Public holidays in Belarus
- Religion in Belarus
  - Christianity in Belarus
  - Hinduism in Belarus
  - Islam in Belarus
  - Judaism in Belarus
- World Heritage Sites in Belarus

=== Art in Belarus ===
- Art in Belarus
- Cinema of Belarus
- Literature of Belarus
- Music of Belarus
- Television in Belarus
- Theatre in Belarus

=== Sports in Belarus ===
Sports in Belarus

- Football in Belarus
- Belarus at the Olympics

== Economy and infrastructure of Belarus ==
Economy of Belarus

- Economic rank, by nominal GDP (2007): 69th (sixty-ninth)
- Agriculture in Belarus
- Banking in Belarus
  - National Bank of Belarus
- Communications in Belarus
  - Internet in Belarus
    - Internet censorship in Belarus
- Companies of Belarus
- Currency of Belarus: Rubel
  - ISO 4217: BYR
- Energy in Belarus
- Healthcare in Belarus
- Mining in Belarus
- Belarus Stock Exchange
- Tourism in Belarus
- Transport in Belarus
  - Airports in Belarus
  - Rail transport in Belarus
  - Roads in Belarus

== Education in Belarus ==
Education in Belarus

- List of universities in Belarus
- Academic grading in Belarus

== See also ==
- List of Belarus-related topics
- Outline of Europe
- Outline of Slavic history and culture
- List of Slavic studies journals
