= Bence Máté =

Hungarian wildlife photographer (born 1985)

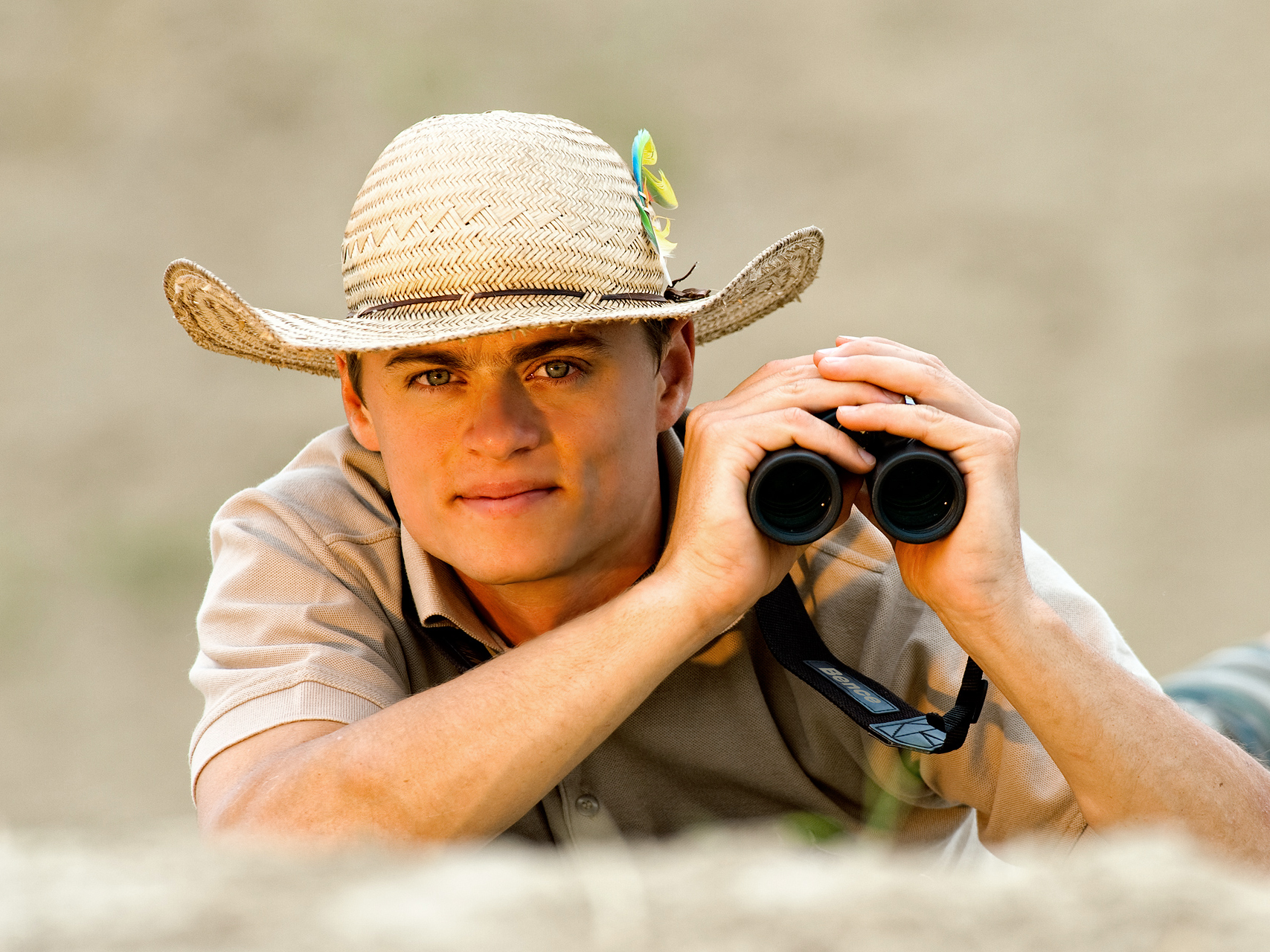
- Born: February 26, 1985 (age 41); Szeged, Szeged
- Education: Pusztaszer Elementary School; Kiss Ferenc Forestry Vocational School
- Occupation: Photographer
- Years active: 1999-today
- Title: Nature photographer
- Awards: BBC Wildlife Photographer Of The Year 2010, BBC Young Wildlife Photographer Of The Year 2002, Young Wildlife Photographer Of The Year Hungary 2000, 2001, 2002, 2003, 2004, Wildlife Photographer Of The Year Hungary 2006, 2008, 2010, 2013, 2015
- Website: www.matebence.hu

Bence Máté is a Hungarian wildlife photographer. He pioneered the one-way glass photography technique now popular among hide-based nature photographers around the world. In 2010, his image 'Marvel of Ants' won the Wildlife Photographer of the Year grand title.

== Life ==
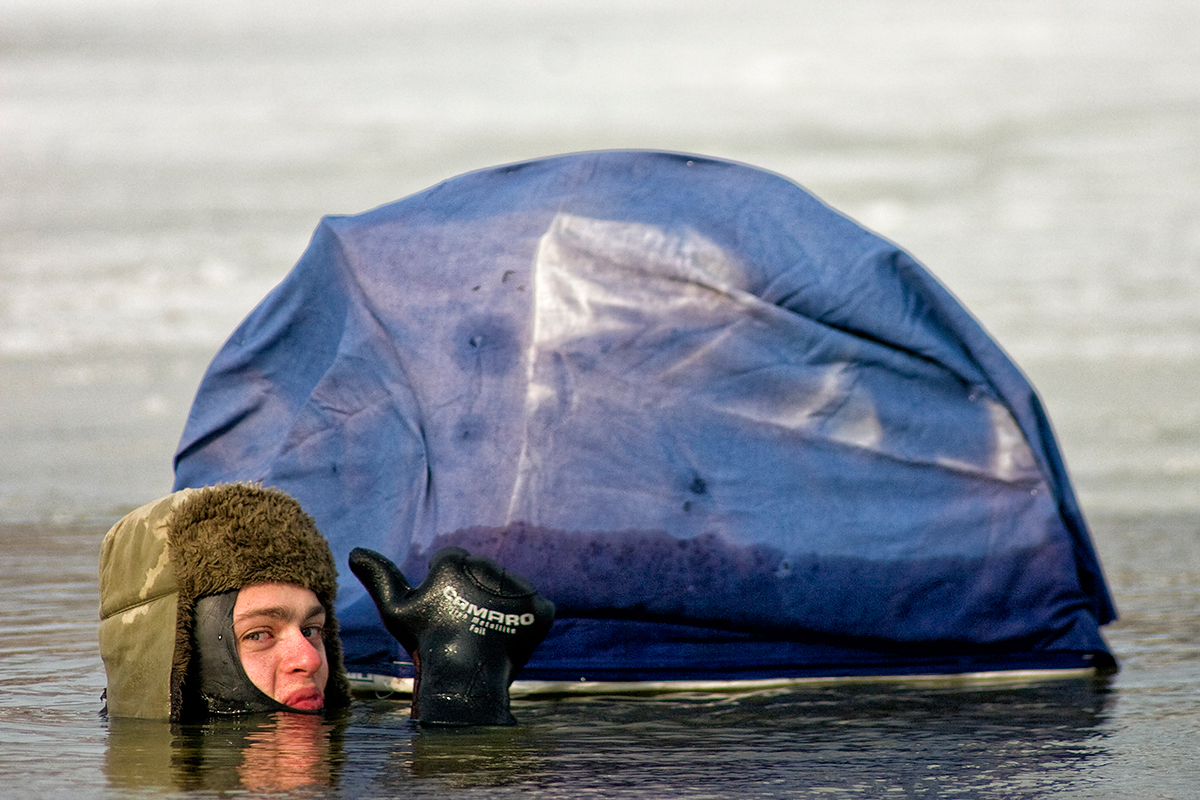
Ice bath, 2005

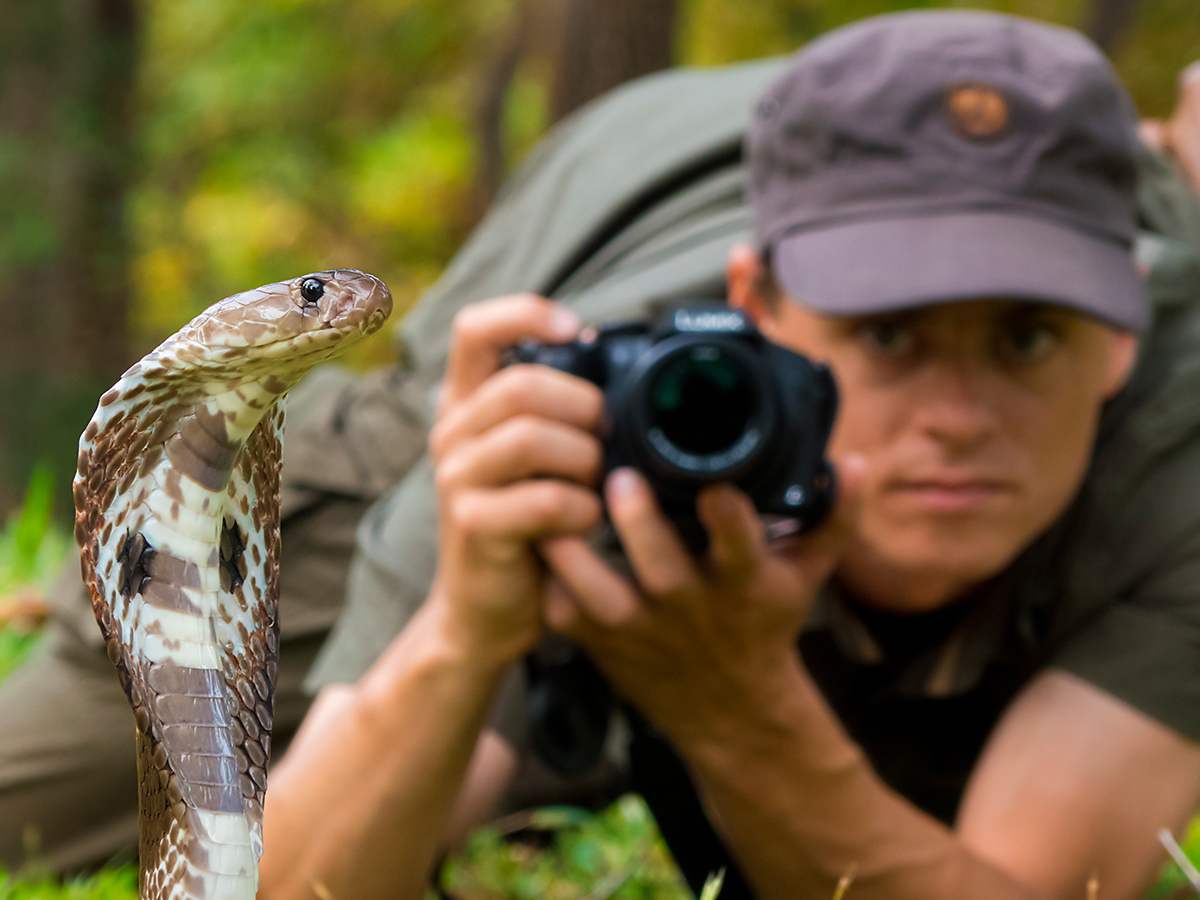
Photographing cobra in Sri Lanka

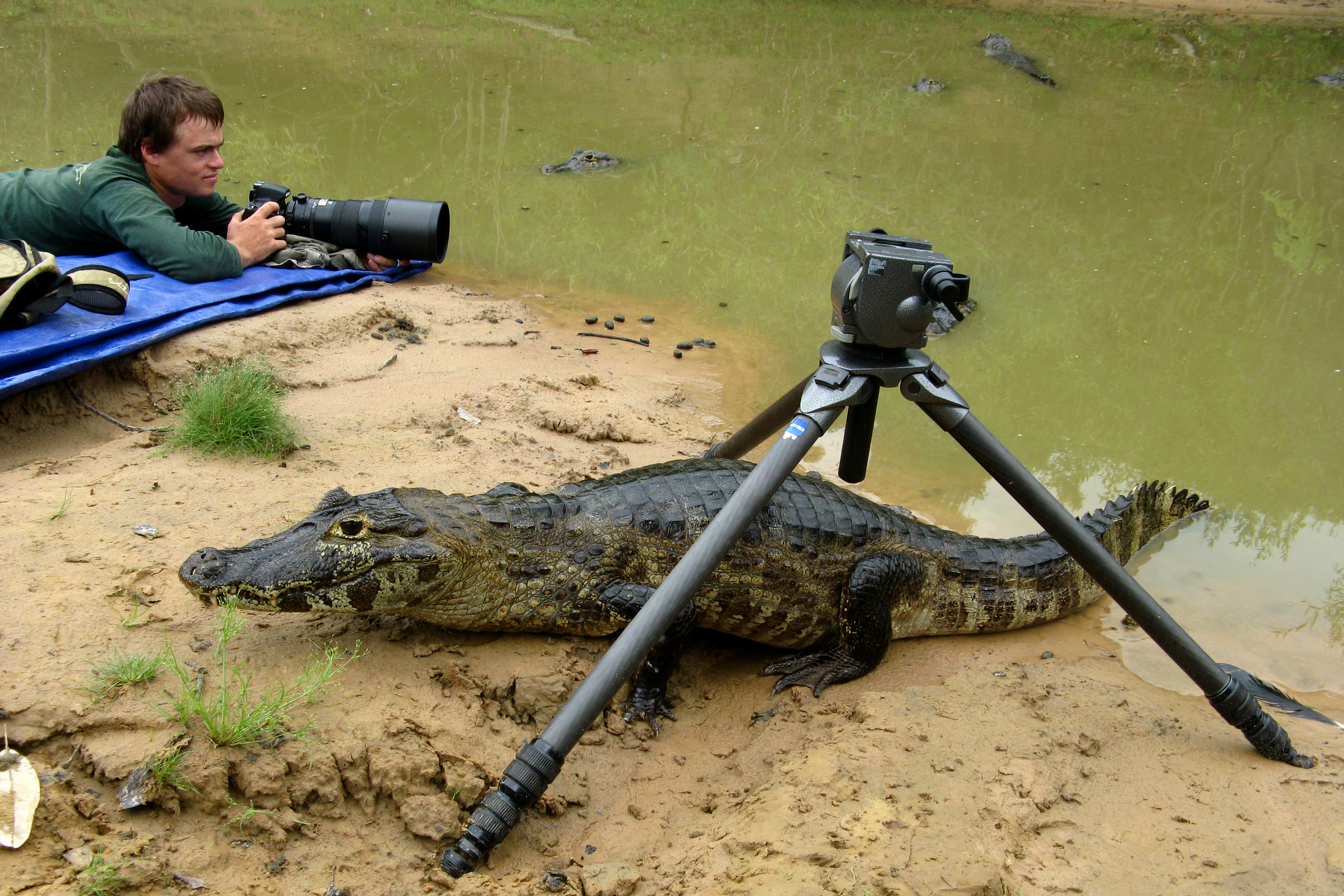
Caiman photography in Brazil, 2009

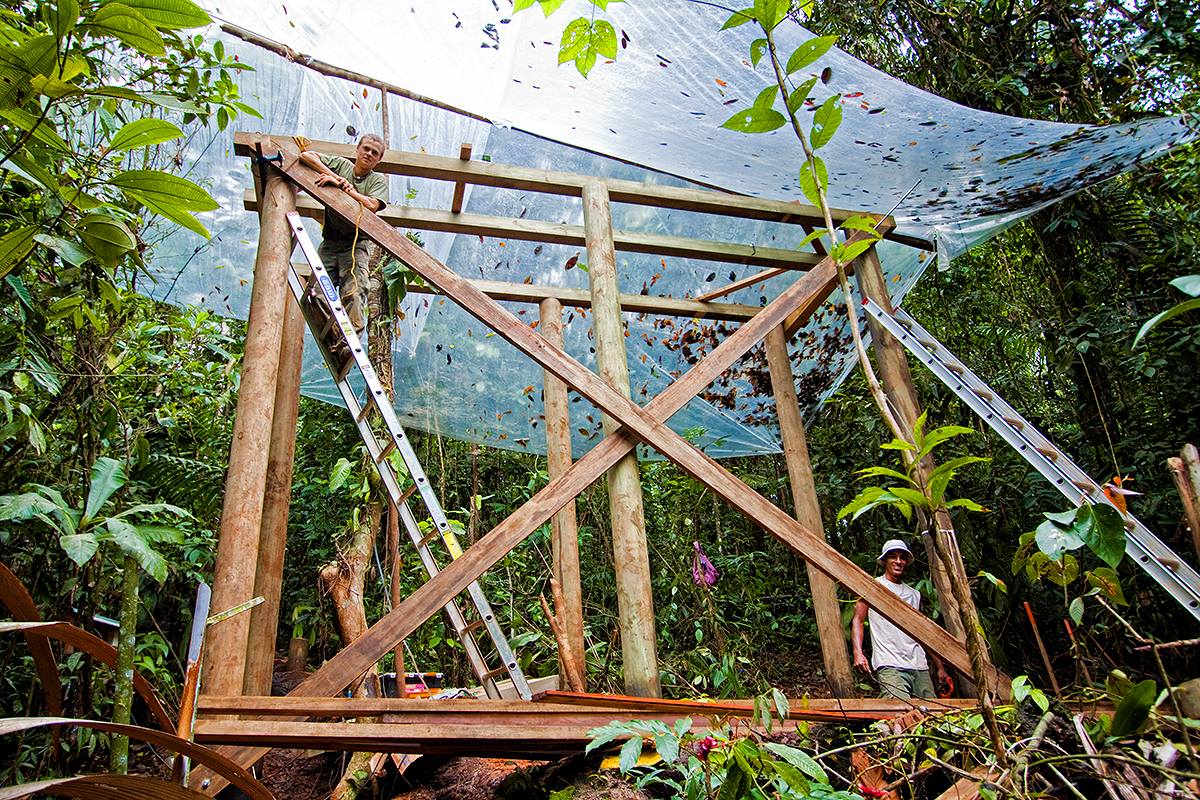
Tower blind, Costa Rica, 2009

Bence Máté was born in Szeged on 26 February 1985. When Máté was two, the family moved to the edge of the village of Pusztaszer, and built a house by the wetlands. Máté went to the primary school in Pusztaszer, where both his parents were teachers. Later, he attended the Kiss Ferenc Forestry High School.

In 2000, Máté was named Hungary's 'Young Wildlife Photographer of The Year'. He won that title a total of five times between 2000 and 2004.

In 2002, at the age of 17, he became a member of naturArt, the association of Hungarian Wildlife Photographers.

In 2001, the image 'Susliks' was highly commended in the BBC Young Wildlife Photographer of the Year competition and, the following year, in 2002, his image 'Recycling' won him the title of the BBC Young Wildlife Photographer of the Year.

In November 2004, he switched from analogue to digital technology. In spring 2005, he experimented with a one-way glass photo technique, which allows him to photograph shy animals more closely without disturbing them.

In 2005, Máté won the BBC Wildlife Photographer of the Year's Eric Hosking Award (for photographers aged 18–26). He photographed wildlife of Pripyat National Park in Belarus as part of National Geographic's Wild Wonders of Europe, which included 69 European wildlife photographers photographing the rich and varied natural heritage of 48 European countries. In 2006, he was named Hungary's 'Wildlife Photographer of the Year' for the first time. He won this title in 2006, 2008, 2010, 2013, 2015. In 2010, his image of leaf-cutter ants, entitled 'Marvel of Ants', won him the Wildlife Photographer of the Year, and Máté became the only photographer in the history of the competition to win the Grand Prize in both the young and adult category. In 2010, Máté was named Honorary Citizen by the village of Pusztaszer in recognition of his contribution to the local community.

== Significant awards ==
- Young Wildlife Photographer of the Year (international), 2002
- Wildlife Photographer of the Year (international), 2010
- Young Wildlife Photographer of the Year (Hungary), 2000, 2001, 2002, 2003, 2004
- Wildlife Photographer of the Year (Hungary), 2006, 2008, 2010, 2013, 2015
- Wildlife Photographer of the Year: Eric Hosking Award for the best portfolio, 2005, 2007, 2010, 2011
- Wildlife Photographer of the Year (international): Birds category, Winner, 2014
- Bird Photographer of the Year (England), 2005
- GDT – European Wildlife Photographer of the Year (Germany), 2015, Mammals category, Winner
- Nature's Best Photography competition (USA), 2010, 2012, 2014, Category 1st prize
- Environmental Photographer of the Year (England), 2010, Category 1st prize
- Memorial Maria Luisa Photo Contest (Spain), 2010, Overall winner
- MontPhoto International photography contest (Spain), 2014, 2015, Overall winner
- Aves International Photo Contest (Belgium), 2014, Overall winner
- Transnatura International Nature Photo Competition (Romania), 2015, Overall winner
- National Wildlife international wildlife photography competition (USA), 2014, Overall winner
- EuroNatur International Photography Competition (Germany), 2014, Overall winner
- Trierenberg Super Circuit international (Switzerland) Best of Show 2011, 2014, 2017
- Worldpress Photographer of The Year 2017 Nature III. Prize

== Books ==
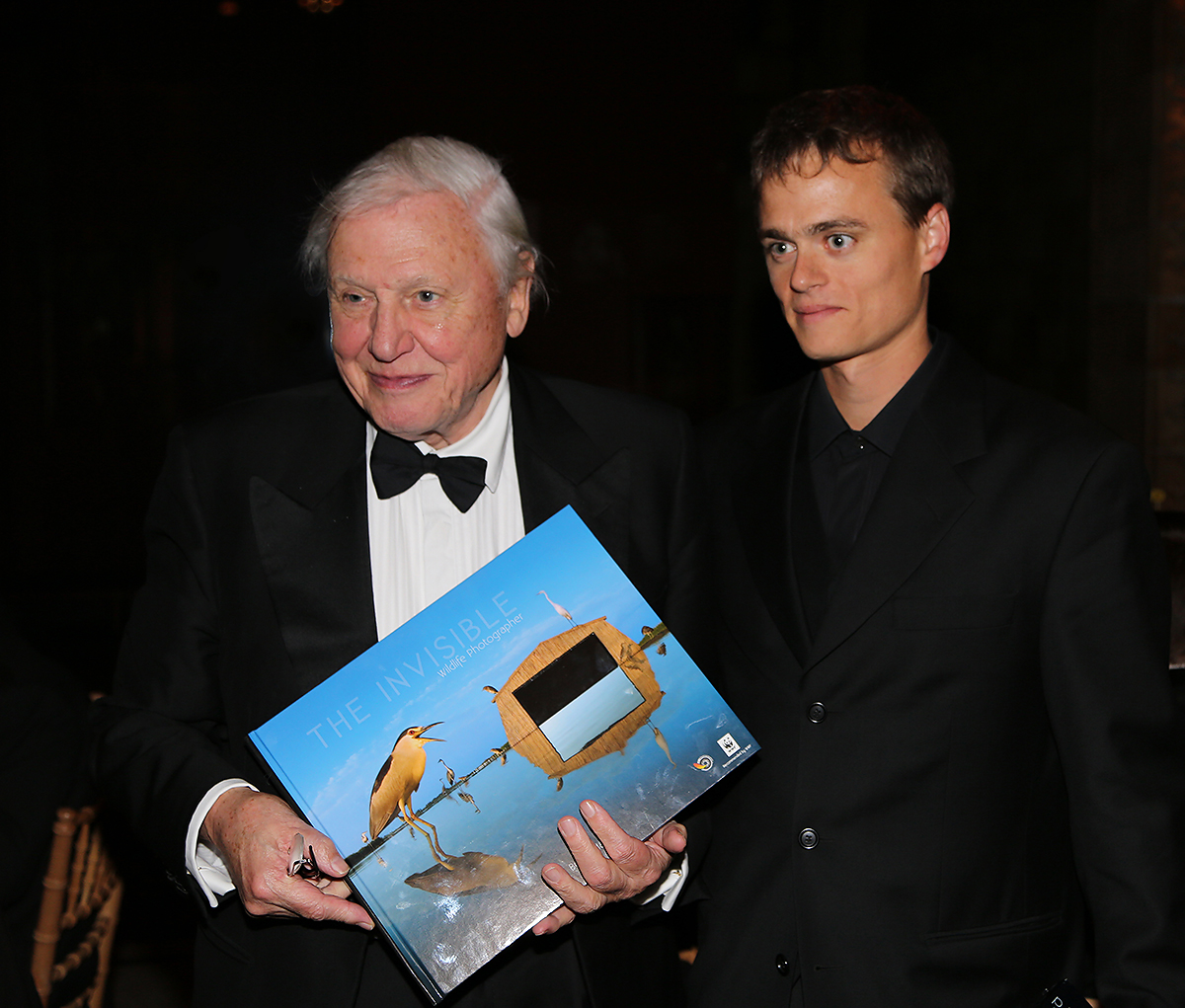
with Sir David Attenborough, London, 2014

- The Invisible Wildlife Photographer – ISBN 978-963-06-9845-0. English and Hungarian.
- The Handbook of Bird Photography – ISBN 978-1-937538-10-1. Co-authors: Markus Varesvuo and Jari Peltomäki; publisher: Rocky Nook. English, German, French and Finnish.

== Films ==
'The Invisible Bird Photographer'. The természetfilm.hu scientific film workshop, owned by Chello Media, was commissioned by Spektrum Television to shoot a 3 x 26-minute series. The slow motion camera shots were prepared by Máté. Director: Attila Molnár; cinematographer: Zsolt Marcell Tóth, Máté; narrator: Péter Rudolf.

Part 1: The miracle water
Part 2: The three tenants
Part 3: Fish dinner
