= List of national parks of Belarus =

Location of national parks within Belarus

This is a list of national parks of Belarus. It also lists main nature reserves.

There are currently four national parks in Belarus. The Belavezhskaya Pushcha National Park is a trans-boundary park between Belarus and Poland. Together parks cover more than 3,300 km^{2} (1,300 sq mi).

== History ==
While all four national parks in Belarus were established in the 1990s, the first protected nature reserve (zapovednik) of the country dates back to 1925 during the Belorussian SSR. Reserves in Belarus were subject to many changes and reforms during the time of the Soviet environmental management system, notably during the 40s and 50s when the Soviet Government revised the regulations around the exploitation of natural resources on protected land.

Following the Chernobyl disaster in the 1986, a new category of protected reserve was created for the Polesie State Radiological and Ecological Reserve which indicated a large zone of southern Belarus impacted by the radioactive fallout of the distaster.

It wasn't until after the fall of the Soviet Union that Belarus would officially designate national parks, largely based on former Soviet zapovedniki.

== National parks ==
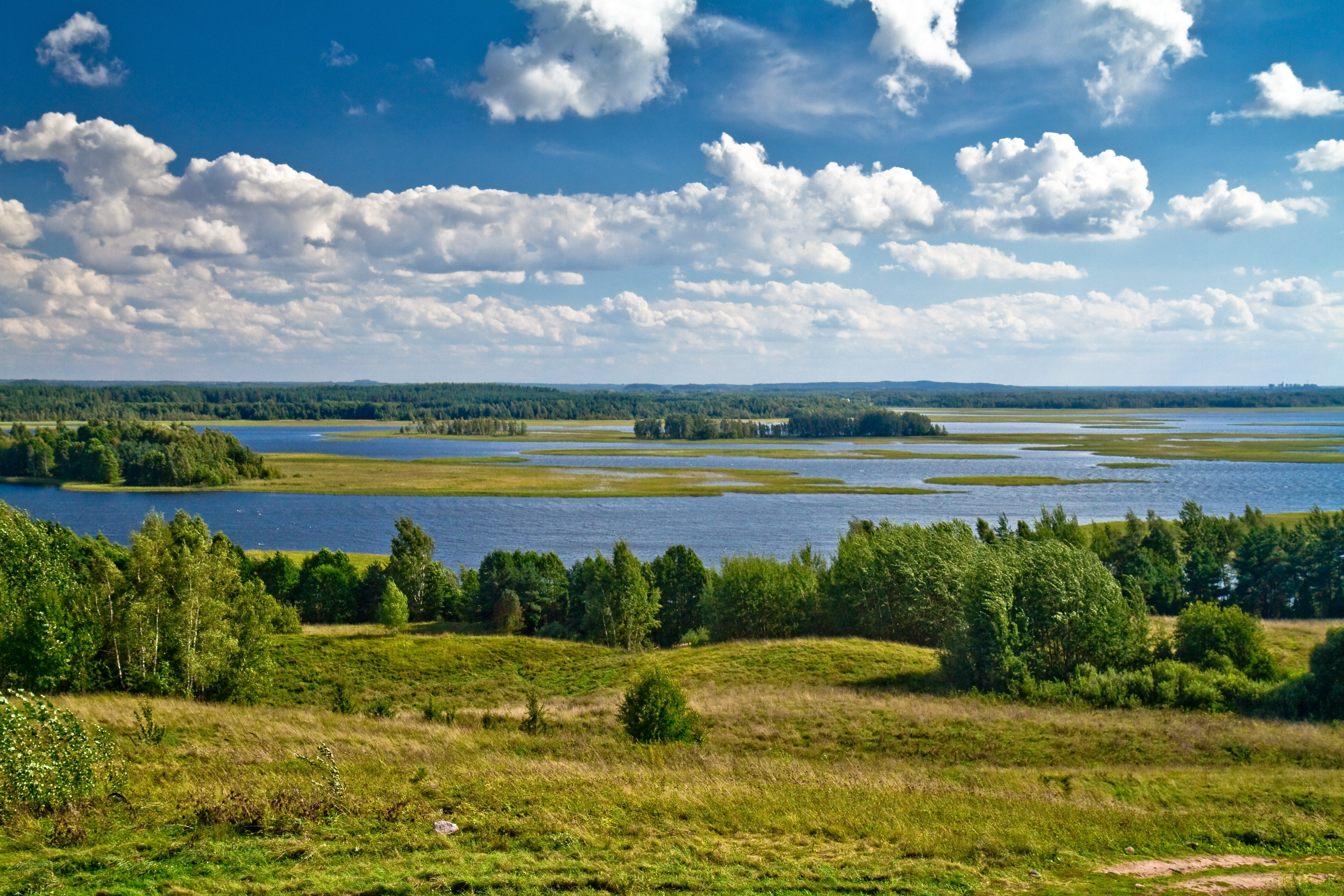
Braslaw Lakes

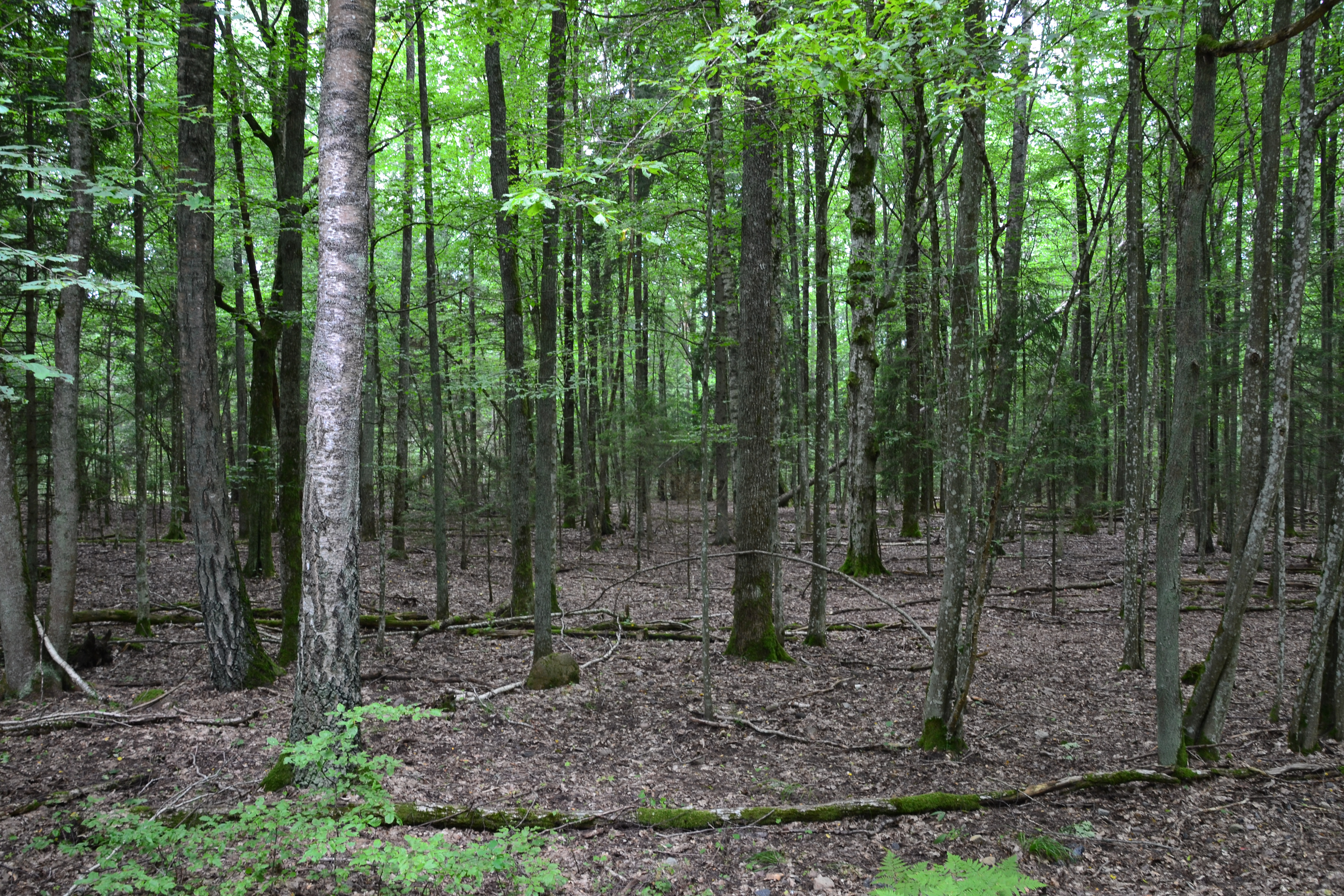
Belavezhskaya Pushcha

Name	Belarusian name	Region	Area	Established
Belavezhskaya Pushcha National Park	Нацыянальны парк "Белавежская пушча"	Brest Region and Grodno Region	1,500.69 km^{2} (579.42 sq mi)	1991 (1932)
Braslau Lakes National Park	Нацыянальны парк "Браслаўскiя азёры"	Vitebsk Region	691.15 km^{2} (266.85 sq mi)	1995
Prypyatski National Park	Нацыянальны парк "Прыпяцкi"	Gomel Region	858.41 km^{2} (331.43 sq mi)	1996
Narachanski National Park	Нацыянальны парк "Нарачанскi"	Grodno Region, Minsk Region and Vitebsk Region	1,178.00 km^{2} (454.83 sq mi)	1999
Polesie State Radiological and Ecological Reserve	Палескі дзяржаўны радыялагічна-экалагічны запаведнік	South of Belarus	1,313 km^{2} (507 sq mi)	1988

== See also ==
- Protected areas of Belarus
- List of national parks
- Naliboki forest
