= Pripet Marshes =

Pinsk Marshes Pripet Marshes Пінскія балоты / Прыпяцкія балоты
- Natural region
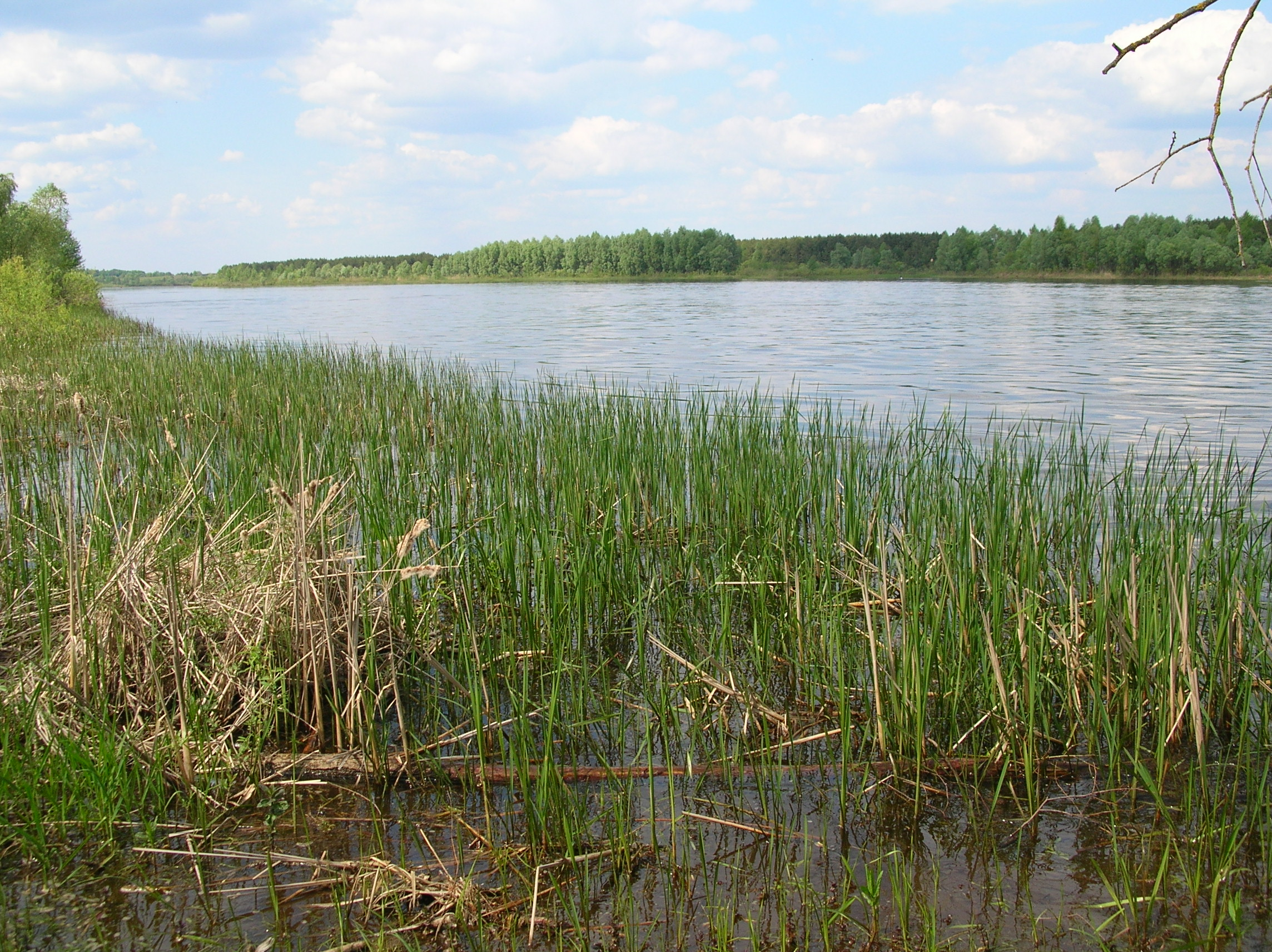
- View of the marshy areas bounding the Pripyat River

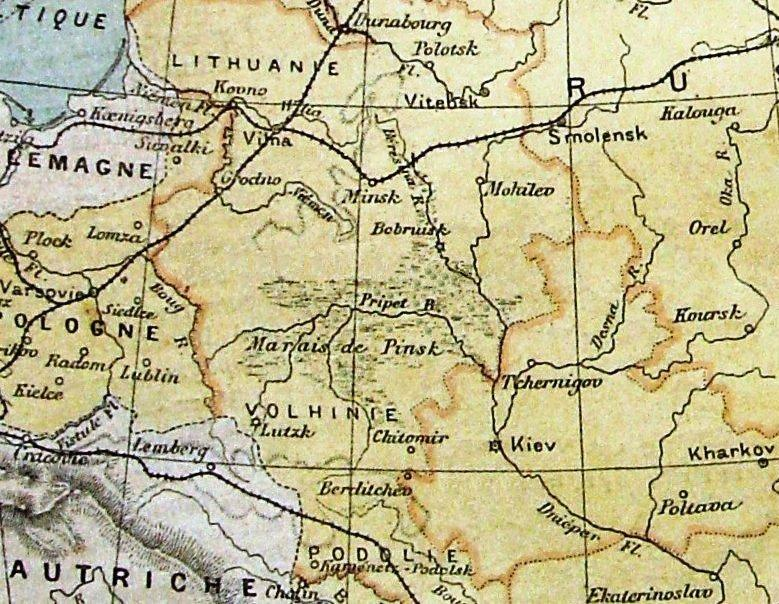
- The Pinsk Marshes (Marais de Pinsk) in an 1888 French map by Pierre Foncin.
- Interactive map of Pinsk Marshes; Pripet Marshes
- The Pinsk Marshes bring together Belarus and Ukraine. Pinsk Marshes; Pripet Marshes (Ukraine)
- Coordinates: 52°N 27°E
- Countries: Belarus and Ukraine
- Elevation: 135 m (443 ft)

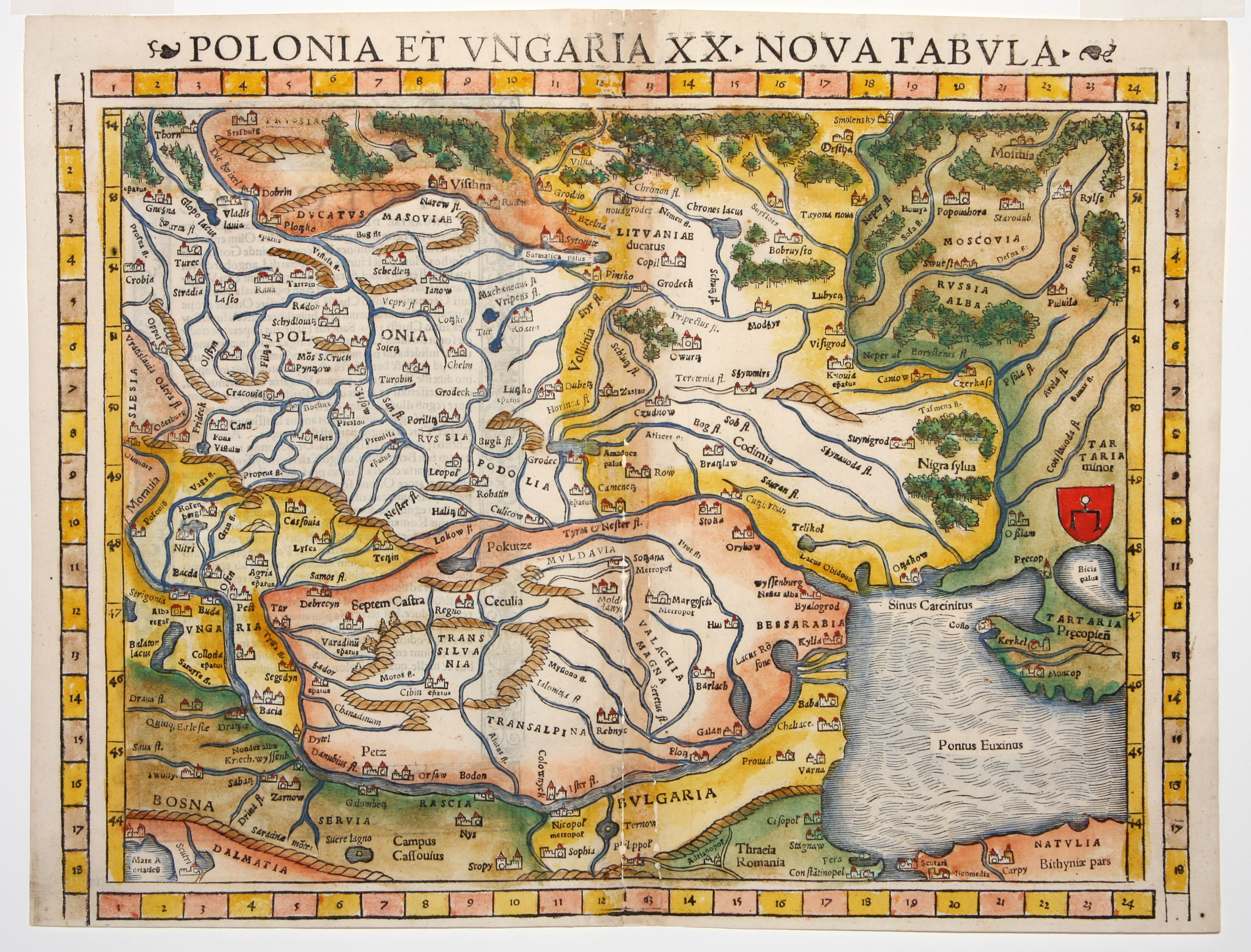
A 1552 map by Sebastian Münster showing the Pinsk Marshes (Sarmatica palus) next to Pinsk

The Pripet Marshes, or Pripyat Marshes (Belarusian: Прыпяцкія балоты, romanized: Prypiackija baloty), also known as Pinsk Marshes (Belarusian: Пінскія балоты, romanized: Pinskiya baloty), the Polesie Marshes, and the Rokitno Marshes, are a vast natural region of wetlands in Polesia, along the forested basin of the Pripyat river and its tributaries from Brest to the west, Mogilev in the northeast, and Kyiv to the southeast. Most of the region is in Belarus, and part is in Ukraine. The Pripet Marshes are the largest wetland area in Europe.

== Overview ==
The Pripet Marshes mostly lie within the Polesian Lowland, hence Polesie Marshes (Woodland Marshes), and occupy most of the southern part of Belarus and the north-west of Ukraine. They cover roughly 269,400 square kilometres (104,000 sq mi) surrounding the sandy lowlands of the dense network of rivers and rivulets forming on both sides of the Pripyat river, one of the main tributaries of the Dnieper. Dense woods are interspersed with numerous marshes, moors, ponds and streams extending 480 kilometres (300 mi) west to east and 225 kilometres (140 mi) north to south. The marshes undergo substantial changes in size during the year, with melting snows in springtime and autumn rainfall causing extensive flooding as the river overflows.

== Flora ==
The Pripet Marshes are home to 827 species of vascular plants, of which 18 are listed as endangered in the Red Book of Belarus.

The Pripet Marshes typically alternate open sedge-reed spaces with almost impenetrable shrub thickets. During the spring flood the swamps are almost completely covered with water, so the local population often has to cross through them in boats. On dry "islands" there are areas of deciduous or pine forests.

== Fauna ==
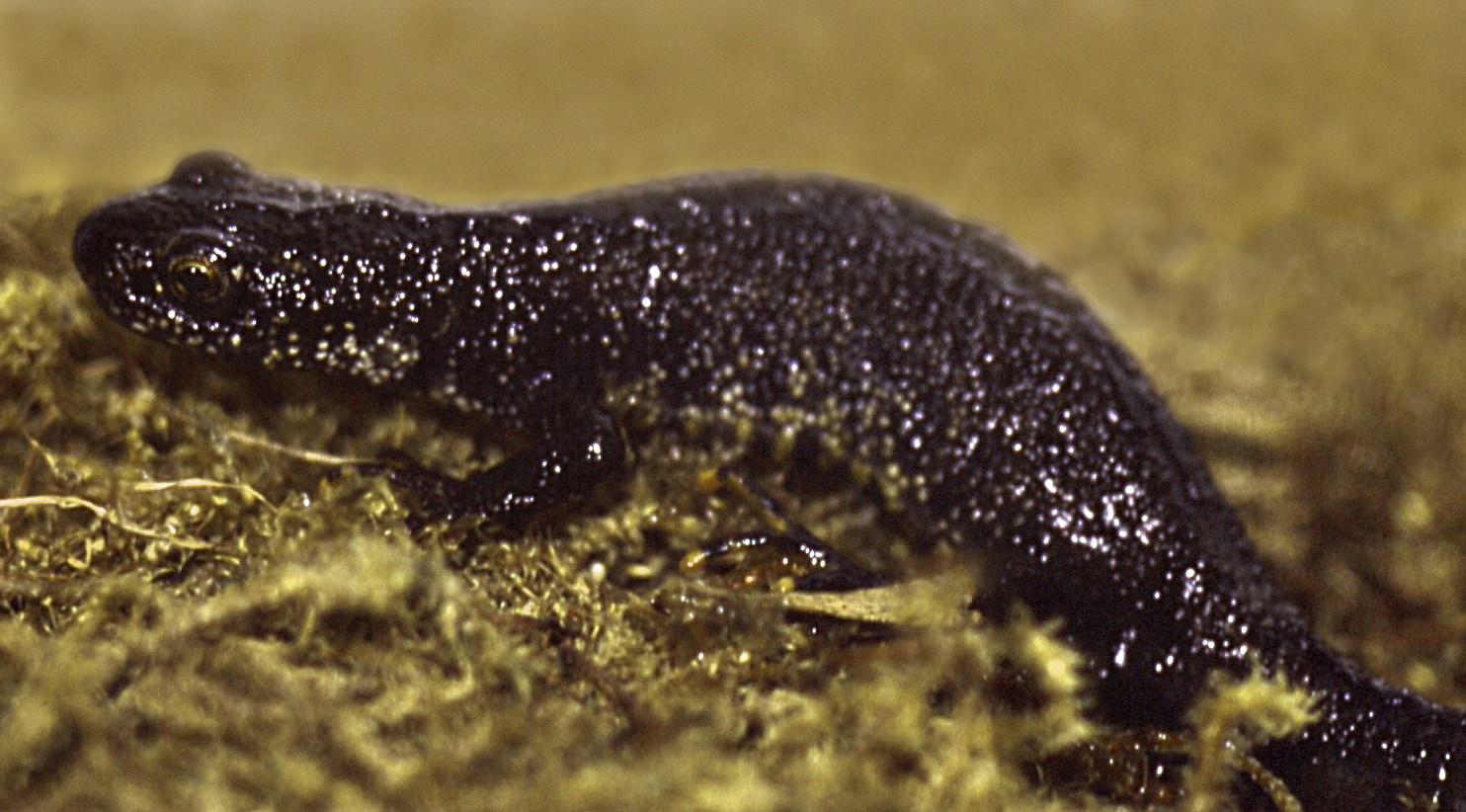
The Northern crested newt, a salamander of the marsh of Pripiat

The Pripet Marshes are home to thousands of birds from different biotopes of the Earth (Europe, Asia, Africa, Mediterranean), some of which come to nest here during migrations; also these swamps are a wintering area for many species of migratory birds nesting in parts of Northern Europe, such as Scandinavia, Finland, the Baltic states and Russia. Of the 246 species of birds which have been observed on this territory, 66 species are listed in the Red Book of Belarus. The park shelters a significant number of species that are globally threatened with extinction: Ferruginous duck (Aythya nyroca), White-tailed eagle (Haliaeetus albicilla) (just 2–3 pairs have been observed), Greater spotted eagle (Aquila clanga) (4–6 pairs), Corn crake (Crex crex), and Great snipe (Gallinago media). The presence of so many birds of national and international significance underscores the importance of this territory for the conservation of biodiversity of Polesie, Belarus and Europe as a whole.

== History ==
The marshes in 1890 in a painting by Ivan Shishkin

Historically, for most of the year, the marshes were virtually impassable to major military forces, which influenced strategic planning of all military operations in the region. Like most other wetlands in Europe, the Pripet Marshes were once seen as an unhealthy area and a focus of sickness. Land reclamation projects of the eastern part of the wetlands were started in 1872 and by the late-19th century drainage of the marshes destroyed 1.5 million hectares of wetlands for use as pasture and farmland.

=== First and Second World War ===
At the start of World War I, the marshes separated the Austro-Hungarian Fourth Army from the XII corps; the few roads that traversed the region were narrow and largely unimproved. That left a wide gap, and the Third Army Corps of the Imperial Russian Army poured in before the Austro-Hungarian Second Army's transfer from Serbia was complete. The Russians soon captured the valuable railhead at Lemberg, then the capital of Austrian Galicia, as a result. Throughout the rest of the war, the wetlands remained one of the principal geographic obstacles of the Eastern Front.

The marshes divided the central and southern theatres of operation during World War II, and they served as a hideout for both Soviet and Polish partisans. At one stage during the war, the German administration planned to drain the marshes, 'cleanse' them of their 'degenerate' inhabitants and repopulate the area with German colonists. Konrad Meyer was the leader in command of the 'Pripet Plan'. Hitler scuttled the project late in 1941, as he believed that it might cause Dust Bowl conditions.

In 1942, after an uprising, approximately 1,000 Jews escaped from the Łachwa Ghetto, of whom about 600 were able to take refuge in the Pripet Marshes.

Known as Pripjet-Sümpfe by the Germans, the wetlands were dreaded by the Wehrmacht troops. During the German invasion of the Soviet Union, the Third Reich armies skirted the wetlands, passing through the north or south of it. However, after the debacle of the Eastern Front in 1944, many retreating units such as the 7th, 35th, 134th and 292nd Infantry Divisions had to cut across the marshy areas. They often needed to build tracks with logs, over which they could pull light loads in horse-drawn vehicles.

=== Proposed drainage in the 1950s ===
There was a plan to drain the wetlands during 1952, when the area of the marshes was under Soviet administration.

=== Chernobyl nuclear disaster ===
In 1986, the region became world-famous because of the Chernobyl disaster; however, the Pripet Marshes should not be confused with the ghost city of Pripyat; the area within which the Chernobyl exclusion zone is located. It is approximately 356 km (221 mi) east-southeast of the geographic centre of the Pripet Marshes area.

== See also ==
- Pripyatsky National Park
- Geography of Belarus
- Geography of Ukraine
