= Protected areas of Belarus =

The protected areas of Belarus are governed by the 1994 law "About the Protected Nature Areas" (Об особо охраняемых природных территориях). and its amendments.

== Overview ==
The law recognizes the following categories:

- zapovednik (a term similar to "nature reserve")
- national park
- zakaznik (nature sanctuary (UNESCO terminology), game reserve)
- Nature monument
- international protected area (особо охраняемая территория международного значения); a 2008 amendment

Some zapovedniks are also internationally recognized as biosphere reserves. A number of areas are classified as Ramsar wetlands of international importance.

The first zapovednik was established in 1925, then in the Byelorussian SSR. In 1939 the Belovezhskaya Pushcha zapovednik was created, in the territory added to BSSR after the Soviet invasion of Poland. The Pripyat nature reserve was created in 1969 and Palessya nature reserve in 1988. In 1991 Belovezhskaya Pushcha was classified as national park. In 1996, the Pripyat nature reserve was classified as the Pripyatsky National Park

== List of protected areas ==
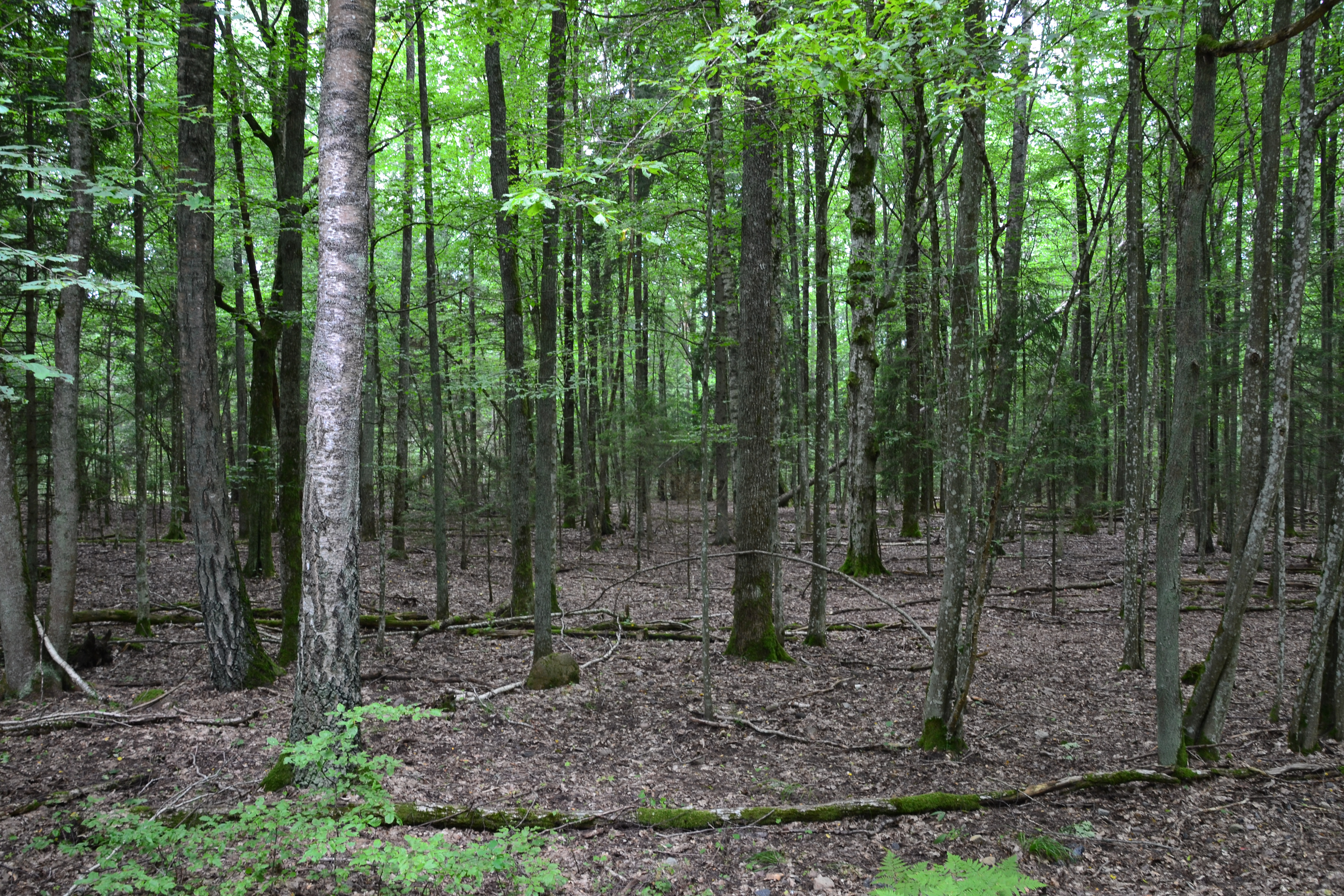
Belovezhskaya Pushcha

In 2008, there were five zapovedniks and national parks, 84 zakazniks of national significance, 349 zakazniks of local significance, 305 nature monuments of national significance, and 544 nature monuments of local significance.

- List of national parks of Belarus
- Berezinsky Biosphere Reserve, Minsk Region and Vitebsk Region, 852 km^{2} (329 sq mi).
- Polesie State Radioecological Reserve, Gomel Region, 2,161 km^{2} (834 sq mi). This reserve is heavily contaminated by the radioactive fallout from the Chernobyl disaster. It borders Ukraine and the Chernobyl Exclusion Zone.
- Białowieża Forest National park and UNESCO biosphere reserve
- Naliboki forest
