= Belorussky =

Belorussky (masculine), Belorusskaya (feminine), or Belorusskoye (neuter) may refer to:

- Belorussky Rail Terminal, a rail terminal in Moscow, Russia
- Belorussky (settlement), a settlement in Pskov Oblast, Russia
- Belorusskaya (Koltsevaya line), a station on the Koltsevaya line of the Moscow Metro, Moscow, Russia
- Belorusskaya (Zamoskvoretskaya line), a station on the Zamoskvoretskaya line of the Moscow Metro, Moscow, Russia

== See also ==
- Belarusian (disambiguation)
