= Academic grading in Belarus =

Academic grading in Belarus follows a ten-point grading scale. This scale has been used since 2002. It is used in primary, secondary and higher education.

Level	Grade	Label	US equivalent
High	10	Brilliant	A+
High	9	Excellent	A
Good	8	Almost excellent	A-
Good	7	Very good	B+
Average	6	Good	B
Average	5	Almost good	B-
Satisfactory	4	Satisfactory	C+
Satisfactory	3	Satisfactory	C
Low	2	Unsatisfactory	F
Low	1	Unsatisfactory	F
Poor	0	Terrible	F-

Marks "1" and "2" are considered as "fail" at school. In higher education "3" is also considered as "fail". Mark "0" is comparing to "F-" in the US for refusing to do some work or an exam.

Besides grades, a "pass" / "no pass" mark may be used for some subjects. E.g. it's an "art" subject in secondary school.
