= Belarusian =

Belarusian may refer to:

- Something of, or related to Belarus
- Belarusians, people from Belarus, or of Belarusian descent
- A citizen of Belarus, see Demographics of Belarus
- Belarusian language
- Belarusian culture
- Belarusian cuisine
- Belarusian People's Republic
- Belarusian State (1920)
- Byelorussian Soviet Socialist Republic

== See also ==
- Belorussky (disambiguation)
