= Geology of Belarus =

The geology of Belarus began to form more than 2.5 billion years ago in the Precambrian, although many overlying sedimentary units deposited during the Paleozoic and the current Quaternary. Belarus is located in the eastern European plain. From east to west it covers about 650 kilometers while from north to south it covers about 560 kilometers, and the total area is about 207,600 square kilometers. It borders Poland in the north, Lithuania in the northwest, Latvia and Russia in the north, and Ukraine in the south. Belarus has a planar topography with a height of about 160 m above sea level. The highest elevation at 346 meters above sea level is Mt. Dzerzhinskaya, and the lowest point at the height of 80 m is in the Neman River valley.

The soils are soddy podzols and peat bogs are common. Belarus is situated on Cratons basement is made of Archean and early Proterozoic crystalline basement rocks and covered by terrigenous, volcanogenic, and carbonate rocks that date to the Riphean (a stratigraphic division of the Proterozoic in Russia and Scandinavia) through the last 2.5 million years of the Quaternary.

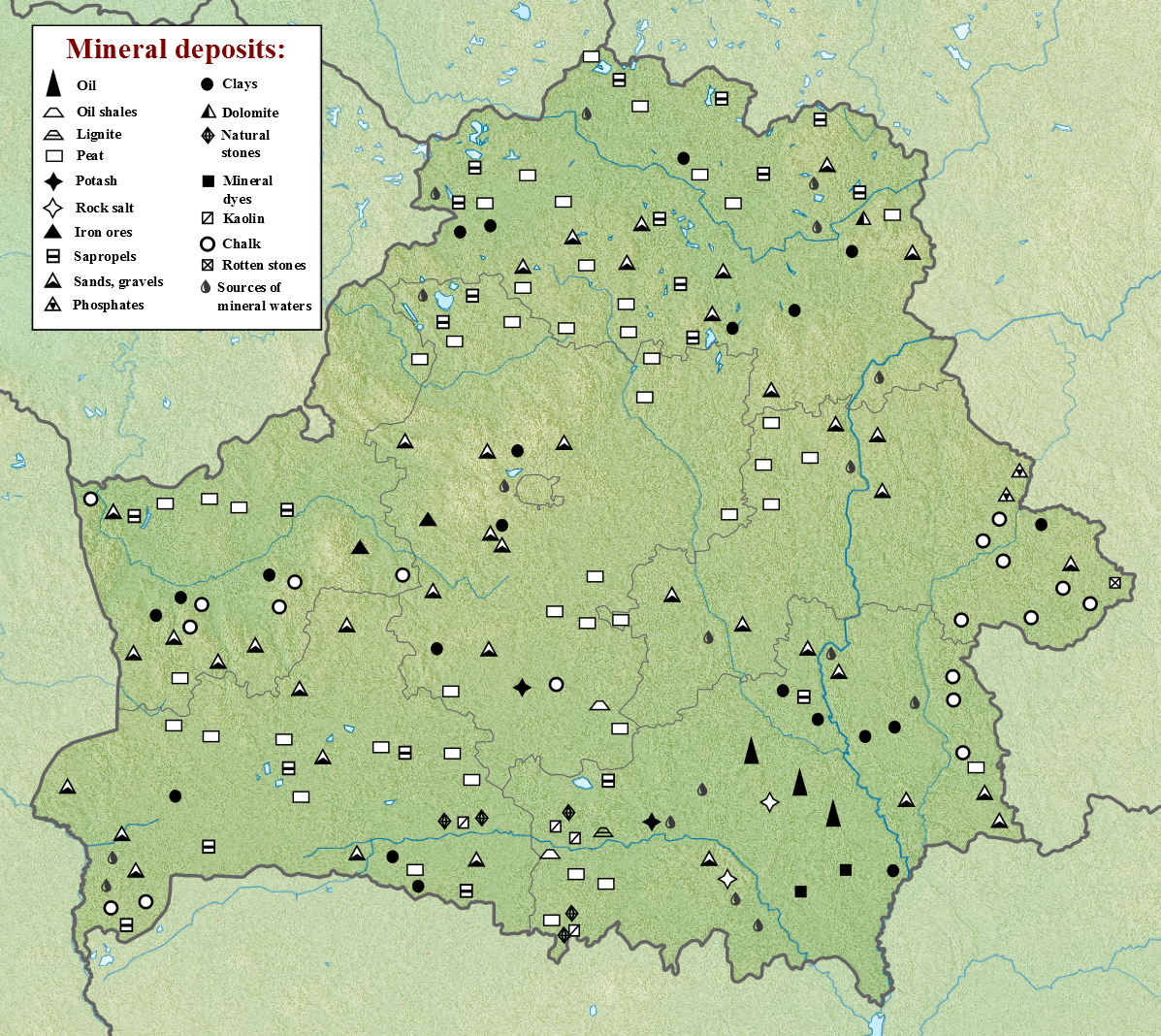

== Stratigraphy and geologic history ==
The land surface in Belarus is mostly covered with Quaternary deposits. In the quarries in Mikashevichy, Precambrian basement rocks is uncovered, while Jurassic, Devonian, Cretaceous, Neogene, and Paleocene deposits are exposed throughout most of the rest of the country. Data about the different stratigraphic subsections was collected from numerous boreholes in Belarus during the Soviet period.

=== Archean-Early Proterozoic crystalline basement ===
The internal structure of the crystalline basement resulted from the long-term transformation of the primary proto-oceanic crust to well-defined continental crust. This took place when the early Archean basalt proto-oceanic crust formed. The rocks formed and metamorphosed into granulite basite, and gneiss.

The accumulation of flysch and volcanogenic-silica-iron, and greywacke took place in the late Archean and at the beginning of the Proterozoic age. They were later transformed into schist and amphibolite gneiss complexes through regional metamorphism, and then deposited in the granulite gneissic basement as the structure evolved.

West Belarus is dominated by rocks of the Early Archean Shchuchin series, which is composed of amphibolite, crystalline schists, and gneisses that are metamorphosed under moderate pressure to granulite grade on the sequence of metamorphic facies. This series is about 5 to 7 kilometers thick. In the east of the region, most of the rocks found there are Early Archean Kulazhin Series. These rocks are represented by biotite gneisses and garnet-biotitic gneiss about 5 kilometers thick. Most of the upper Archean rocks include the Okolovo Series and the Ozery Series. The Okolovo rocks are plagiogneisses, amphibolites, and schists embedded with ferruginous quartzite. The Ozery Series is made up of an amphibolite gneiss complex. The total thickness of both the Okolovo and the Ozery is about 10 kilometers. These rocks are mostly present in central Belarus.

In the south, the series is made up of chlorite-sericite schists, rhyolites, quartzite, andesite, and dacites. In this part of the country, the series has a thickness of about 500 meters, and reaches greenschist metamorphic facies. Some of the rocks that can be found in abundance are ultrametamorphic, intrusive, and metasomatic complexes—that include lower Archean metagabbro, granites, diabase, granitoids, granodiorites, enderbite-charnockite, and Late Archean metagabbros.

=== Late Proterozoic ===
Late Proterozoic deposits include the Vendian and the Riphean rocks. Riphean rocks are found in large paleotroughs and small depressions. Vendian rocks cover most of the country—about 85%. The Riphean rocks are mostly made up of volcanogenic-sedimentary strata including trachandesites, quartz- rhyolites, quartzites, schists, sandstones, and conglomerates. These rocks are encountered in isolated local boreholes—usually at around 140 meters deep.

The middle Riphean series is composed of the Sherovichy Series. These rocks can be seen as a polymictic arkose sandstone strata with gravestone underlining it and quartzitic sandstone on top. On the other hand, the upper Riphean fills the Volyn-Orsha paleotrough that extends from northeast to southwest across the Belarus regions. These series form the Belarus Series

Vendian deposits are divided into three subseries from bottom to top, including the Vilcha Series, Volyn Series and Valdai Series. The Vilcha series is made up of tillite, clay and sandstones that originated during the Neoproterozoic glaciations.. They form a sheet 310 meter thick on the surface. This layer is mostly composed of andesite, dacites, basalts, tuff, trachyliparites with tuff, and tuff-siltstone intercalations with thicknesses of about 550 meters. The Valdai series can be seen as a layer of alternating clays, siltstones, sandstones, and some gravels. In most cases, this layer is about 300 meters thick.

=== Phanerozoic (538.8 million years ago-present) ===
This layer is represented by all the systems discoursed above, and it is widely spread in the region of Belarus. The Ordovician, Cambrian, and Silurian deposits are mostly found in the SW and NW of Belarus. In most of the other parts of the country, the Phanerozoic begins with middle Devonian deposits. However, in uplifted areas it starts with the Cenozoic and Mesozoic sediments.

The Cambrian has two stages: lower and middle stages. The lower consists of the Baltic Series and Vysokovsk Series. The Baltic series is composed of clays, sandstones, and siltstones up to 180 meter thick. The Vysokovsk Series consists of the same components as the Baltic Series but is a little thicker (about 250 meter thick). The middle stage consists of layers of siltstones, sandstones and rarely clays of about 115 meters thick.

The Ordovician has the same components as the Cambrian with additional limestone, sandstone and clay intercalations at the bottom. This layer is about 153 meters thick in the northwest and 53 meter thick in the southwest. The Silurian is about 640 meters thick in the southwest and 60 meter thick in the northwest. This layer consist of limestone, marls, and dolomites. The Devonian includes all the stages, with the early Devonian predominantly found in central Belarus.

== Tectonics ==
The Belarusian Baltic Granulite Belt extends from north southwards for a distance of about 1000 kilometers and is approximately 100–200 kilometers wide. This belt is made-up of metabasic rocks that are products of ultra-metamorphic transformation. It includes granulite blocks that are separated by blastomylonite zones and nappe-thrust structures and linear folding.. Magnetic field research has revealed a series of intense magnetic band anomalies. In the southeast of Belarus is the Braguin Granulite Massif that measures about 150 to 70 kilometers wide, and shows magnetic anomalies of low intensity. Another granulite massif is the triangular Vitebsk Massif which has a composition is similar to that of the Braguin Massif. In northernmost Belarus, the Latvian Saddle is about 200 by 150 kilometers wide, separating the Baltic and the Moscow Synclines. The depth of the ridge is about 0.6 kilometers.

== Natural resource geology ==
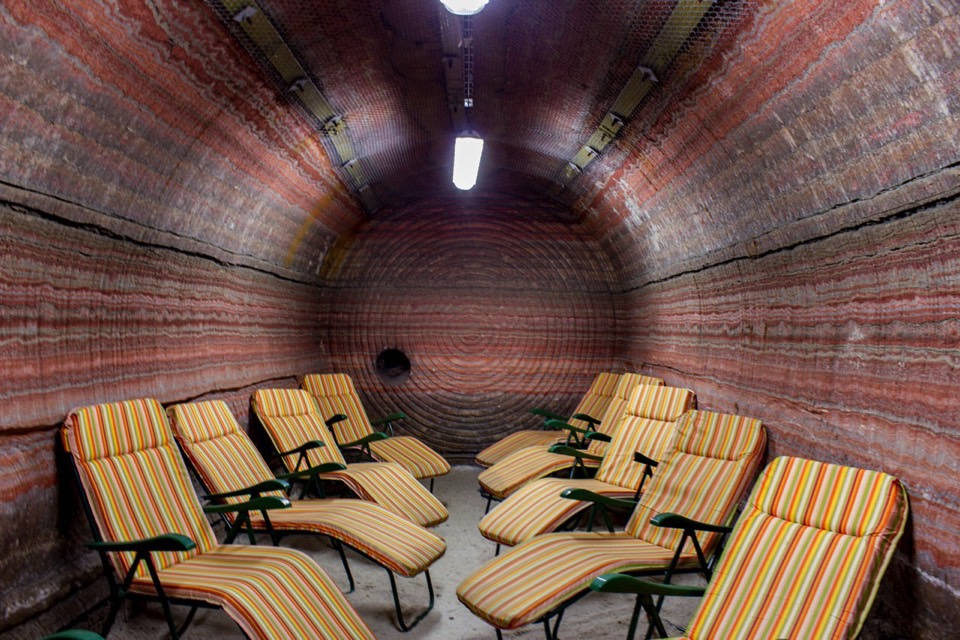
Layers of evaporite rock in a mine in Soligorsk, a site converted to halotherapy

There are large iron deposits in the basement rocks. For example, in the Novoselki deposits there are about 26% iron deposits at a depth of about 150 m. The Okolova has iron deposits of about 35% at a depth of about 260 meters. High volume iron ore reserves are found at a depth of about 700 meters, and they are estimated to hold about t 700 million tons of reserves. Some estimates suggest as much as 1.5 billion tons. The ore contains cobalt, vanadium, titanium, silver and gold. At the Glushkovichy area and Mikashevichy area, are large deposits of gneisses and granites.
