= Pripyatsky National Park =

Nature reserve in Gomel Region, Belarus

- IUCN category II (national park)
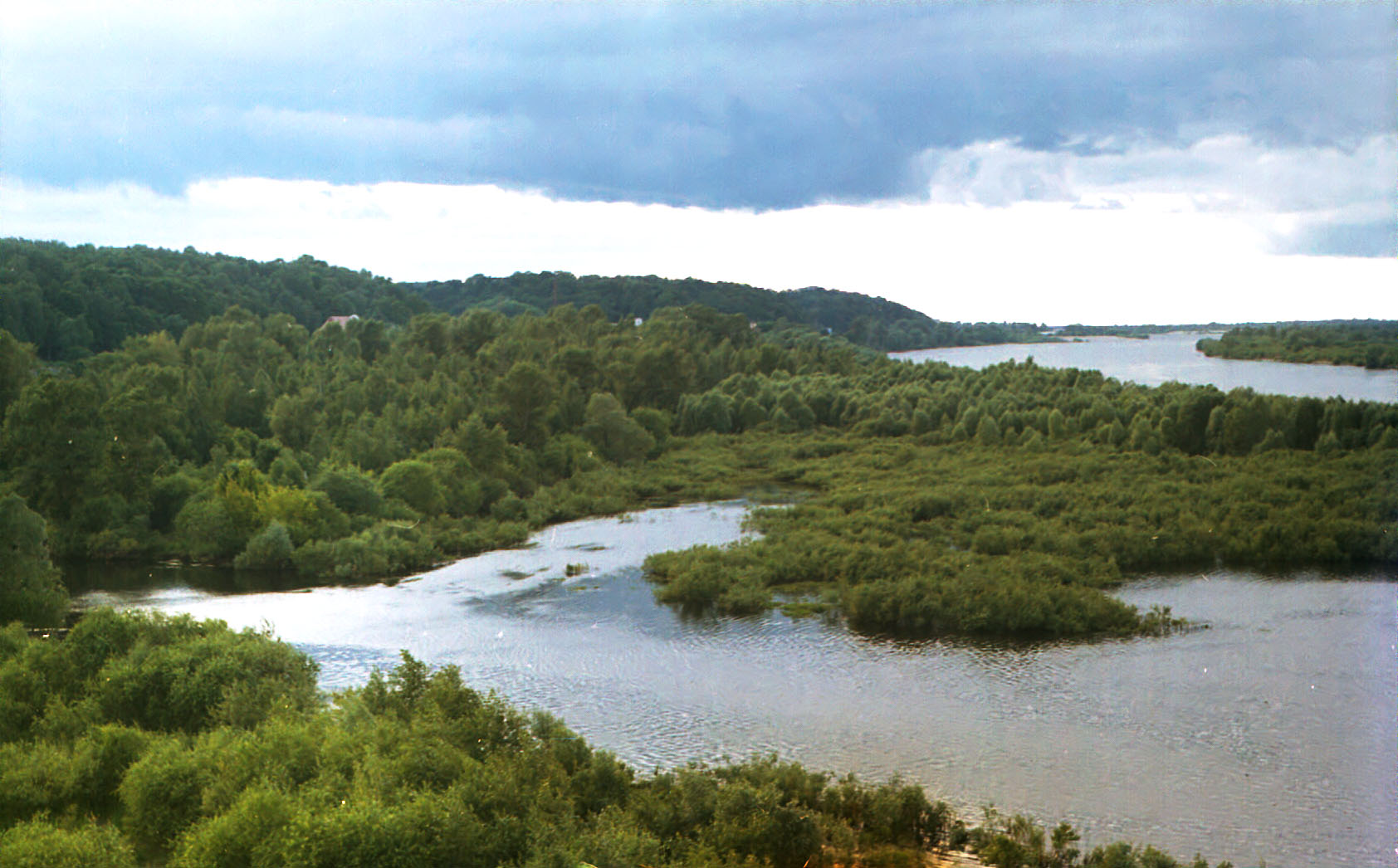
- Pripyat River in Belarus

- Location within Belarus
- Location: Belarus
- Coordinates: 52.016163°N 28.012390°E
- Area: 634.58 km^{2} (245.01 sq mi)
- Established: 1996
Website
https://www.npp.by/
Designations
Ramsar Wetland
- Designated: 29 March 2013
- Reference no.: 2197

Pripyatsky National Park or Pripyat National Park, is a natural reserve in Gomel Region, Belarus. Before becoming a national park in 1996, the area operated as the Pripyatsky Landscape-Hydrological Zapovednik starting in 1969. It was created for preservation of natural landscapes within the floodplain of the Pripyat River, from which it takes its name. Much of the park's area is occupied by turf swamps. BThe transition to national park status was controversial among environmental organizations because it legally permitted business activities, such as logging and hunting, which began immediately after the reclassification.

Its territory is within the Pyetrykaw District, Lyelchytsy District, and Zhytkavichy District.

== Flora and fauna ==
Pripyatsky National Park is home to 51 species of mammals, including elk, wild boar, red deer, European badger, and Eurasian lynx.

== See also ==
- Pinsk Marshes
