= Igor Shpilenok =

Russian wildlife photographer

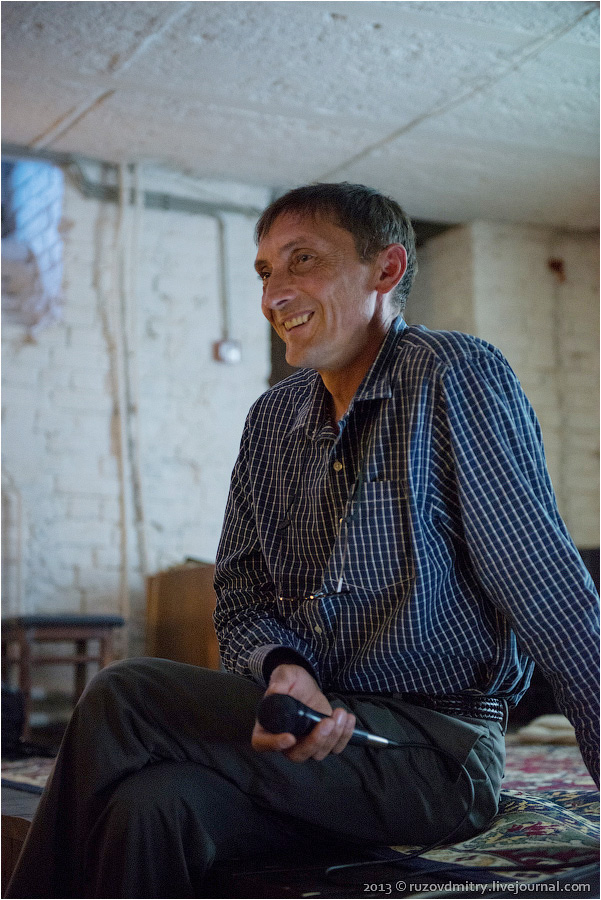
- Born: И́горь Петро́вич Шпилено́к; 28 February 1960 (age 66)
- Occupation: Wildlife photographer
- Spouse: Laura Lynne Williams

Igor Shpilenok (born 28 February 1960) is a Russian wildlife photographer, founder and first director of the Bryansky Les Nature Reserve, author of several books, and environmental inspector. He is a two times winner of the BBC Wildlife Photographer of the Year award. In 2006 and 2007 he received the first prize at the Golden Turtle international photo festival.

== Biography ==
=== Early years ===
Shpilenok was born in Bryansk Oblast, and his father was a passionate hunter who tried to make his son interested in hunting. Instead, Shpilenok grew fond of nature and preferred to enjoy its beauty without hurting it. He decided to become an environmentalist in his teens. In school he became interested in photography. At the age of 12, he discovered a meadow covered with blooming snowdrops in the forest not far from his home. Impressed with its beauty, he felt he needed to share it and decided to buy a photocamera. During the winter he collected the money and in the next spring he returned to the same meadow with a new camera, only to find scorched terrain and chopped trees. At that moment he decided to dedicate his life to the protection of nature.

=== Bryansk Forest ===
Shpilenok graduated from the Bryansk State University as a teacher of Russian language and literature. After graduation, he volunteered to work as a teacher in the most distant school in Novenkoye village. To be as close to Bryansk forest as possible, he settled in a lodge at Staroye Yamnoye (‘The Old Pit’) and every day ventured into the forest to observe its fauna and flora. He wrote essays about the forest and its fragile beauty and sent them with his own photos to the local newspaper, Bryanskiy Rabochiy (Bryansk Worker). Eventually, his works won a state contest on covering conservation issues. After this, the local government paid attention and approved his initiative of creating a nature reserve. The nature reserve Bryansky Les was officially established in 1987, and Shpilenok was appointed its director.

Under Shpilenok, illegal poaching was eliminated in the reserve. For this he was repeatedly threatened, and his house was burned several times.

In the early 1990s, when almost no governmental financial support was given to the Bryansk forest, Shpilenok managed to attract international donors through WWF and promote conservation ideas among the locals. His team successfully reintroduced European bisons (Note: By 2022, the population exceeded 140.) and bears to the forest.

=== Kamchatka ===
After 10 years of working in Bryansk forest, Shpilenok left the director post and decided to pursue his other childhood dream — discovering Kamchatka. His eldest son Tikhon Shpilenok was assigned to work at Kurils Nature Reserve and in 2009 appointed director of Kronotsky Nature Reserve. He led the fight against massive poaching that was ruining the local ecosystem. At that time on lakes Kurile and Kronotskoye, poacher gangs extracted more than 500 kg each every day during the spawning season. Bears were killed for their bile, fat, and claws. Tikhon Shpilenok assembled a team of state inspectors that included his uncle Dmitry, brother Peter, father Igor and the best specialists from different nature reserves of Russia. According to Dmitry Shpilenok's recollections, the poachers were protected by criminal gangs and some law enforcement officers, and the Shpilenoks were constantly threatened. His step-mother Laura Lynne Williams was forced to leave Kamchatka because due to her American citizenship she was the easiest target for the threats. Only wide media coverage of the case helped them to avoid revenge from poachers and their patrons. 13 years later the story of their struggle to eliminate poaching was shown in Dmitry Shpilenok's film Sockeye Salmon, Red Fish. The movie was shown at 192 international film festivals and collected 61 awards.

In Kamchatka, Igor Shpilenok started his own blog on LiveJournal where he posted stories about animals and photographs. He wanted to use the blog as a tool to attract wide attention to Russia's unique wild nature and the threats it has due to human intrusion. Gradually, his audience grew to 2-3 million visitors per month, sometimes even to 6 million. In 2012, his blog was awarded the first prize in ‘Best Picture’ nomination.

In the summer of 2007, Shpilenok left the Valley of Geysers one day before the huge landslide that destroyed several geysers and blocked the valley. He was one of the first scientists to return there and describe the event.

In 2013, he published two books: My Kamchatka neighbors. 370 days in Kronotsky nature reserve and Kamchatka that I love. Stories in and outside the lens.

=== Photo projects ===
Shpilenok's photographs were published in Smithsonian, National Wildlife, BBC Wildlife, and many other international publications. In 2006 and 2009 he was named the Wildlife Photographer of the Year by BBC, he also won first prizes at the ‘Golden Turtle’ photo contest in 2006 and 2007.

On 10 April 2013, Shpilenok began a four-year project traveling through Russian nature reserves from Bryansk Fores" to Kronotsky Nature Reserve. He travelled the route in a GAZ-3308 vehicle with a diesel engine and a living module. The aim of the trip was to tell about Russia's nature reserves through photography, and to promote the ideas of wildlife conservation and respect for nature. Shpilenok drove 60,000 km, visiting more than 50 nature reserves and national parks, where he shot several series of photo stories, such as Virgin Forests of Russia. A photo exhibition and a two-volume photo book titled One hundred protected years were presented in Moscow's GUM after the trip.

In 2014, Shpilenok became a member of the International League of Conservation Photographers.

In 2022, Shpilenok set off on a new large-scale expedition called 'Protected Russia from Kola Peninsula to Kamchatka'. He dedicated this project to aerial photography of nature reserves. The first part of the project started in September 2022, with Shpilenok crossing the European part of Russia in three and a half months. Shpilenok's third wife, Maria, and their mutual daughter Aglaia, joined him on this journey. The second stage of the expedition, the Kamchatka one, is scheduled for 2023.

=== Family ===
Shpilenok was married to Laura Lynne Williams until her untimely death in 2018. From Williams, he has two sons. His sons from the first marriage Tikhon Shpilenok and Peter Shpilenok followed his steps and both became environmentalists. Tikhon was appointed director of the Kronotsky Nature Reserve, and after his death in 2006 his brother Peter took his place. Impressed by his son's passion, Shpilenok's father ceased hunting and joined the ranks of Bryansk forest inspectors fighting illegal poaching.

Shpilenok's brother Dmitry Shpilenok is a director of documentary films, as well as an environmentalist. Igor's second brother Nikolay is also a wildlife photographer. The brothers made numerous collaborations; they all worked on Dmitry's film about wild salmon, Sockeye Salmon, Red Fish, and worked with Tikhon Shpilenok, fighting illegal poaching in Kronotsky Nature Reserve.
