= Peter Shpilenok =

Russian ecologist and environmental inspector

Petr Shpilenok
- Born: Пётр И́горевич Шпилено́к; 8 September 1984 (age 41); Bryansk
- Occupations: Ecologist, environmental inspector

Peter Shpilenok (born 9 September 1984) is a Russian ecologist and environmental inspector, head of the Kronotsky Nature Reserve in 2017-2022. Resigned in 2022 in protest at the unfair criminal prosecution of colleagues in the "cleansing case".

== Biography ==
=== Early years and family ===
Peter was born on September 9, 1984, as the second son to Igor Shpilenok, a prominent Russian wildlife photographer and founder of the Bryansky Les Nature Reserve. Three generations of the Shpilenok family have been involved in nature conservation — Peter's grandfather, Peter Shpilenok Senior, was an inspector of the Bryansk Forest Reserve. Uncle Nikolai Shpilenok is a wildlife photographer who contributes to Geo and Vokrug sveta magazines. Peter's second uncle is a documentary filmmaker, he also worked as a state inspector and a member of the task force of the Kronotsky Nature Reserve. Peter's eldest brother Tikhon was the head of the Kronotsky biosphere reserve from 2007 up to his death in 2016. Their step-mother Laura Lynne Williams was one of the founders of the Russian WWF branch.

According to Igor Shpilenok, Peter and Tikhon literally "grew up in the woods" and spent their entire childhood in the reserve. Peter was involved in environmental conservation from an early age, with his father and elder brother he guarded the nature reserve and participated in anti-poaching raids. After school, he went to St Petersburg, where he enrolled at the Faculty of Law of SPbSU, specializing in environmental protection. After university, he returned to Bryansk Forest as deputy director.

=== Kronotsky Nature Reserve ===
In the late 2000s, Peter went to work at the Kronotsky Nature Reserve. There with his brother, father and uncles he fought poaching of bears and wild salmon that was gaining industrial scale. During the spawning season, about a tonne of caviar was poached daily on Kronotsky and Kurilsk Lakes, and bears were killed to sell their bile, fat and claws. The network of poachers was covered by local officials and the police who received their shares. It was Tikhon Shpilenok who brought together a group of best inspectors from all over Russia, unaffiliated with the locals, and were able to stop poaching in the Kronotsky reserve. These events, as well as video footage recorded during the inspections, formed the basis of Dmytro Shpilenok's film Sockeye Salmon, Red Fish. released in 2020 and honoured with more than 80 awards at international film festivals. The Shpilenoks have received numerous death threats, there have been attempts on their life, and a campaign in the press was unleashed to discredit Igor Shpilenok's wife, Laura Williams. According to Dmitry Shpilenok, they all were saved only because news coverage of their anti-poaching was and the wide public outcry following the movie's release.

Constant stress and pressure undermined Tikhon Shpilenok's health, he died of cancer at the end of 2016. After his death, on 17 March 2017, Peter Shpilenok became head of the Kronotsky Nature Reserve.

Pyotr Shpilenok and his colleagues are developing eco-tourism in the Kronotsky Nature Reserve, which not only does not harm, but also helps nature conservation: with proper route planning and numbers of tourist groups, for example, they act as public control and prevent poaching. One of Shpilenok's projects is the ‘Nature Conservation School’, which teaches environmental volunteerism, inspection work, and trains guides and tour guides. He has also helped Kronotsky develop a network of modern visitor centres where tourists are taught the rules of behaviour in the reserve. These visit centres also offer lessons for children, film screenings and lectures.

Under Shpilenok's leadership, the reserve has increased its focus on environmental education. A series of 10 short films 'Kamchatka's Wildlife - the Pride of Russia', directed by Dmitry Shpilenok, was made to promote conservation objectives. In early February 2022 the project "Kamchatka: your incredible adventure" was held in Moscow, with lectures, film screenings and photo stories about the animals that inhabit the Kronotsky Nature Reserve. Another project called 'The Whale's Backyard' is a joint educational programme with the charitable association Beautiful Children in a Beautiful World to raise awareness of marine mammal issues.

Under Peter Shpilenok, the lands of the Koryak State Nature Reserve: Parapolsky Dol, Cape Goven and Lavrov Bay, were included in the "Kronotsky Nature Reserve". Since 2021, Shpilenok has been trying to push for the creation of the East Kamchatka Marine Mammal Sanctuary.

In July 2021, Peter Shpilenok received the Kamchatka State Award "for his personal services and achievements in developing and implementing unique projects that contribute to solving environmental problems and developing ecotourism on the peninsula".

=== ‘Cleansing case’ ===
In 2021, Tikhon Shpilenok was posthumously convicted in the criminal "Cleanup Case" of the Kronotsky Nature Reserve. According to the indictment, he and his staff embezzled 454 million rubles of budget money allocated for the removal of scrap metal from protected areas. Built solely on the testimony of two witnesses, the verdict does not stand up to criticism - the conscientious work of clearing 243 kilometres of territory and removing more than 1,300 tonnes of solid waste and over 5,000 barrels of fuel and lubricants is supported by hundreds of hours of video footage and numerous photographs, reports from federal channels and several independent expert reports, which the court, however, refused to take into account. Director for Science and Tourism Roman Korchigin, head of the scientific department Darya Panicheva, deputy director for financial support Oksana Terekhova and deputy for general affairs Nikolai Pozdnyakov received prison sentences of 4.5 to 8 years.

In protest at the unfair persecution of his colleagues, Peter resigned. He remained with the reserve as deputy director to continue his fight to free his colleagues and not interrupt conservation projects.

In early September 2022, over 60 representatives of environmental organisations wrote an open letter to Russian President Vladimir Putin, asking him to take personal control of the case against Kronotsky employees and to instruct the Prosecutor General's Office and the Investigative Committee to re-examine the case and conduct independent investigations.

On 7 February 2023, the Kamchatka Regional Court annulled the conviction and released the defendants from custody; the case was sent back to the trial court for reconsideration. Defence lawyer Irina Diachenko and Peter Shpilenok called this an important step towards restoring justice.

== Sources ==
- Pulnova, Helen (2017). "Brands of Bryansk Les" (PDF). Zapovednye Ostrova. 15 (154): 40–42.
