= Laura Lynne Williams =

Russian-American ecologist (1969–2018)

- Born: May 21, 1969; New York, U.S.
- Died: October 28, 2018 (aged 49); Suzemka, Russia
- Occupation(s): Ecologist, journalist, equine-assisted therapist

Laura Lynne Williams (May 21, 1969 – October 28, 2018) was a Russian-American ecologist, founder of the Russian World Wide Fund for Nature (WWF) branch and WWF office on Kamchatka. She was also director of the Wild Salmon Center, as well as a journalist, writer, and equine-assisted therapist.

== Early life and education ==
Williams was born in New York, May 21, 1969. Her parents were a lawyer and a doctor. For the first two years of her life, she lived in South Dakota where her father served in Rosebud Indian Reservation. When she turned two, her parents divorced and her mother took the children to Denver, Colorado. In 1978–1984, she attended Graland Country Day School. In 1984–87, she studied at the Fountain Valley School in Colorado Springs, Colorado.

She entered Cornell University in 1988. That year, answering one of her professors as to why she wanted to study Russian, Williams answered that "Russia is a big country and it has to have a lot of wildlife." In 1990, she first arrived in Russia for a two month language study course. In 1991, she graduated from Cornell as a Bachelor in International Environmental Politics.

== Career ==
=== WWF ===
In 1993, WWF offered Williams to go to Russia and establish a WWF branch there to access biodiversity in the country and challenges to protect it. In the same year, she came to Moscow and together with Vladimir Krever, they opened a small office in an apartment in a residential building close to Tulskaya metro station. With time, Krever and Williams managed to raise more than $10 mln for many environmental projects at Russian nature reserves. Their help played a decisive role because in the early 1990s, the country suffered from the hardest economic crisis and its nature reserves received almost no financial support from the government.

=== Bryansk Forest Reserve ===
While working in Moscow at the WWF office, Williams got to know the Russian photographer and founder of the Bryansk Forest reserve Igor Shpilenok. He brought a grant application for an educational program in Bryansk Forest that aimed to raise awareness of the importance of wild nature preservation among locals. He saw education as one of the most effective ways to fight and prevent poaching. After four years as the head of the Russian WWF office, Williams accepted Shpilenok’s offer and came to work in the Bryansk Forest as a specialist in environmental education and promotion.

As recalled by Williams herself, her parents were supportive of her decision, while her brother, a producer in Hollywood, was extremely skeptical. Soon, Williams married Igor Shpilenok. The couple built a house in Chukhrai village near the reserve, and they had two sons. In Bryansk forest, she led many educational programs for children and the elderly, attracted international financial support, and helped with an ambitious project of reintroduction of European bison.

In 1999–2000, Williams continued her education and received a Master's Degree in conservation biology at Yale University.

=== Kamchatka ===
In the late 1990s, Shpilenok’s eldest son Tikhon was appointed director of the Kronotsky Nature Reserve in Kamchatka. Igor, with his second son, Peter, moved there to help fight commercial poaching of bears and salmon that was ruining the local ecosystem. During the breeding season, one group of poachers collected more than a ton of caviar daily, throwing away the dead fish. The poachers were backed up by both local law enforcement and criminal gangs. Tikhon, Igor and Peter invited some of the best inspectors from other Russian nature reserves and managed to almost completely eliminate the illegal caviar business. They received multiple threats and managed to survive only due to wide media attention brought to their case. Igor’s brother Dmitry, made a film on salmon that won numerous international awards.

Williams and her sons followed Shpilenok and in 2006, Williams helped establish the WWF office in Kamchatka. In 2009, she headed the Kamchatka’s Wild Salmon Center. As recalled by Guido Rahr, WSC executive director, the center’s performance declined dramatically in Kamchatka and they needed someone who could understand its specifics both regarding people and nature. Her work laid a foundation for all WSC future operations in the region.

Because of Shpilenok’s fight with poachers she found herself under severe pressure, a smear campaign ran in local media against her. When she traveled back to the US to prolong her Russian visa, she was denied the visa for no real reasons. As it turned out later, two administrative cases were fabricated against her, presumably by order of poaching criminal groups. Only thanks to support of colleagues from the Russian Ministry of Nature Protection, the fraud was revealed, two officers in charge of it were fired, and Williams could get back to Russia to her sons and husband. However, the constant pressure forced Williams to return to the Bryansk Forest.

=== Equine-assisted therapy ===
Upon her return to the Bryansk Forest, Williams started working with horses, her life-long passion. She studied equine-assisted therapy in Australia and got a certificate from the International Association for Horse Assisted Education, trained as an equine facilitator in Germany. In 2015, she launched her ‘Human and Horse’ training program based on immense psychological benefits offered by communication with horses. She had a herd of nine horses rescued from slaughter-houses or neglected by previous owners. In Chukhrai village the horses were healed, trained, and given better life conditions. Her idea was to facilitate communication between horses and people on an equal basis. The program did not include horse riding because it requires human dominance.

=== Literary works ===
As a freelance journalist, Williams wrote to National Wildlife, BBC Wildlife, Geo, Canadian Wildlife, and other publications. In the last few years of her life, she also wrote a column, "Notes from a Russian Village", for the Russian Life magazine.

In 2008, she published a book, The Storks’ Nest: Life and Love in the Russian Countryside, based on her life and work in Russia.

== Death and legacy ==
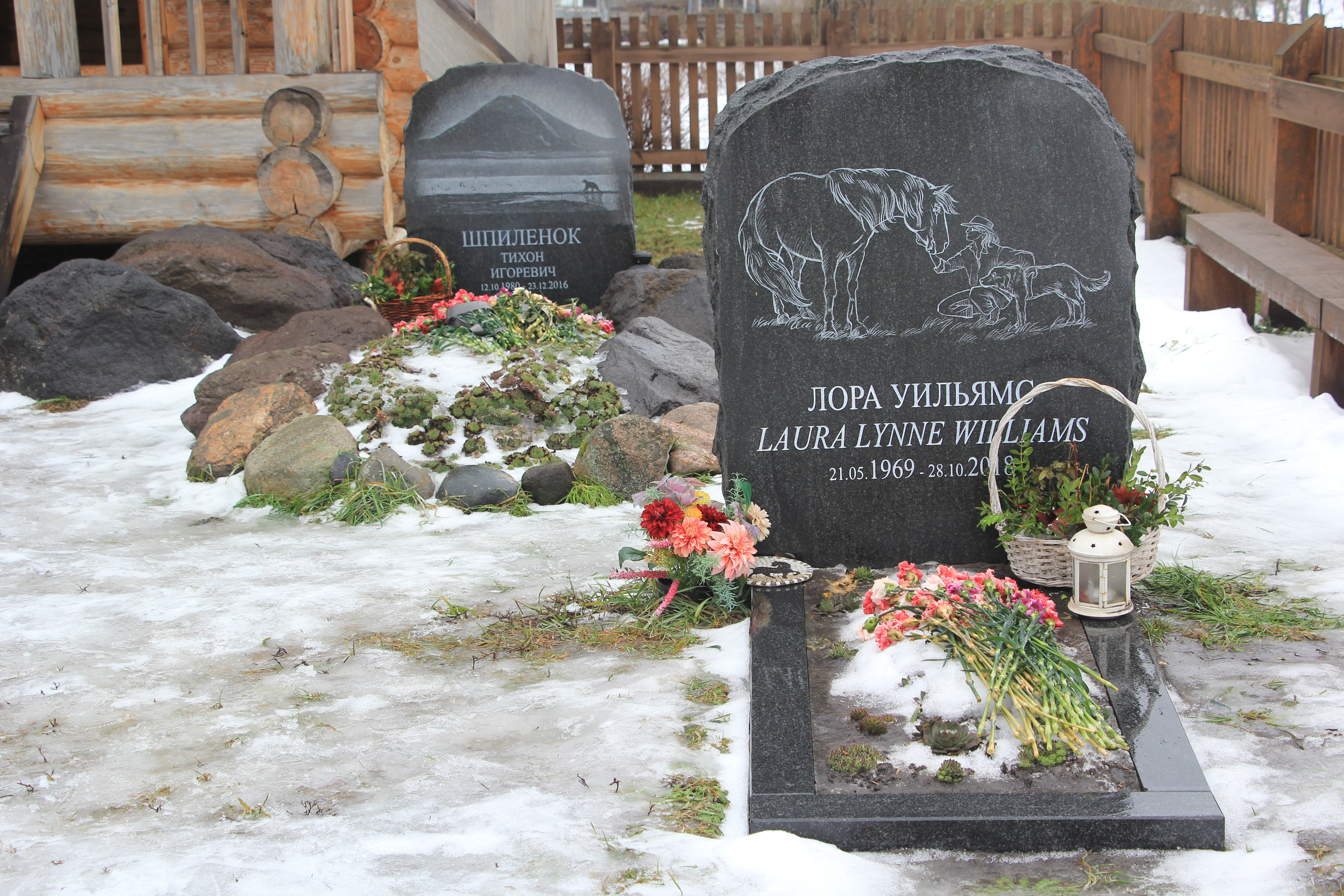
Laura’s tomb in Chukhrai village

On October 27, 2018, Williams fell from an untamed horse. She suffered multiple grave injuries and died in Suzemka at a local hospital.

In 2019, WWF Russia established an award in her honour. The Laura Williams prize is annually given to the most prominent young Russian environmentalists and conservation scientists. The prize pool is financed by her family, friends, and colleagues.

‘Human and Horse’ program is also active and continued by her colleagues from the Bryansk Forest and volunteers.
