= Salmon Watch =

Environmental education program in Oregon

- Coho Salmon spawning on the Salmon River; Image courtesy of Bureau of Land Management
- Formation: 1993; 33 years ago
- Founder: Oregon Trout (later The Freshwater Trust)
- Type: Nonprofit
- Tax ID no.: 38-3886799
- Legal status: 501(c)(3)
- Headquarters: World Salmon Council; 1355 NW Everett Street; Suite 100; Portland, Oregon
- Region served: Pacific Northwest, United States
- Website: worldsalmoncouncil.org/salmonwatch/

Salmon Watch is an environmental education program established in 1993 to provide Oregon middle school and high school students with experiences at rivers where salmon spawn. With support of the World Salmon Council, the program's in-class curriculum and field trips to rivers emphasize wild salmon conservation and watershed management.

== Description ==
Salmon Watch provides classroom curriculum focussing on "wild salmon heritage and the importance of being well-informed and responsible citizens". Since its beginnings with Oregon Trout, the curriculum has prepared students for field trips with adult volunteer guides, at locations where salmon are spawning in rivers and streams, "to foster deeper understanding of salmon habitat, ecosystems and the cultural values salmon represent."

Beginning in 1994, Salmon Watch initially served 1,300 students from Portland and Eugene, with plans to serve hundreds more throughout the state. For example, students from George Middle School in Portland measured the quality of water, and watched silvery salmon "slapping the water with their bodies while they carved holes in the riverbed for their eggs." Students also listened to a Native speaker explain "Northwest tribal legends that illustrated man's relationship to nature."

The Middle Fork Willamette Watershed Council sponsors Salmon Watch in collaboration with Eugene Water & Electric Board (EWEB). Four stations that guide student learning take place at the water's edge, where students often see spawning salmon:

- Macroinvertebrate station — Bugs that are the diet of young salmon, indicating habitat quality.
- Water quality station — Water temperature and turbidity—a measure of water clarity—and levels of dissolved oxygen, to determine if salmon can thrive in the waters.
- Riparian station — Benefits healthy forests provide for salmon, including trees shading streams to keep them cool, filtering water through their root systems, and dropping branches, providing places for fry to hide, and slowing the water, creating pools, or creating riffles, stirring the water, and increasing oxygen levels.
- Fish biology station — Salmon life cycles, threats, and how we can protect salmon.

The World Salmon Council's annual funding for Salmon Watch has been granted by the Oregon Conservation and Recreation Fund of the Oregon Department of Fish and Wildlife: $30,000 in 2022; $39,500 in 2024; and $45,000 in 2025.

== History ==
Salmon Watch was established in 1993 by Oregon Trout (which later became The Freshwater Trust). By 1995, Oregon Trout had 4,000 members. A 1995 fundraiser banquet in Eugene helped to support Oregon Trout programs, including Salmon Watch classroom instruction and field trips. The Oregonian reported in 2002 that Salmon Watch had honored a "Teacher of the Year" for excellence teaching students about "environmental issues and conservation of wild fish."

By 2002, Oregon's award-winning Salmon Watch was sponsoring 129 class trips in 19 of Oregon's counties, for 3,780 students. Statewide in 2003, approximately 4,470 students were expected to participate in 149 field trips in 19 Oregon counties, and more than 30,000 Oregon middle and high school students had participated in Salmon Watch in its first decade. By 2008, Salmon Watch was annually serving "...nearly 5,000 students in 163 classrooms in the Portland, Salem, Corvallis, Eugene, Medford, Ashland, Monument, Gold Beach and Bend areas."

After a shift in mission of The Freshwater Trust, Salmon Watch was discontinued in 2010. Salmon Watch was then revived under the auspices of the World Salmon Council, which has since adapted and delivered the Salmon Watch program, "to connect students with wild fish... in delicately intertwined riparian ecosystems of the Pacific Northwest."

The Salmon Watch program in 2017 began offering curriculum en Español, and providing Spanish-speaking tour guides for students from Corvallis School District's dual immersion schools, Lincoln and Garﬁeld elementary. Recruiting people who could teach in Spanish at dual immersion schools "...was meant to make the trips more inclusive." Salmon Watch has recruited Oregon State forestry and ﬁsh and wildlife graduate students from Spanish-speaking countries. According to one of the graduate student recruits, "Doing science lessons in Spanish also helps develop the students' vocabulary."

In 2022, the World Salmon Council supported a "Salmon Watch streaming option," consisting of 6 short films created by Freshwaters Illustrated, interactive online games, and two 360° virtual tours "...that bring the river to you." Though the films were designed for formal educators, individuals who are not educators may also request access on the World Salmon Council's website.

== Salmon Watch locations ==
=== Lane County ===
In 2003, students from Lane County, wearing boots in shallow water and polarized sunglasses to reduce glare from a river stream in the McKenzie Watershed, captured and identified larvae of midges. They "tested river water for purity and learned to identify redds, the gravel beds where salmon spawn." One student said, "This is the first time I've been this close to them... It's cool to see them alive, instead of, like, with butter on it." They also learned the Eugene Water & Electric Board had constructed a spawning channel, a "series of gravel bars in a side channel of the McKenzie, to replace spawning habitat lost when EWEB built the Carmen-Smith hydropower project in the 1960s."

Students from Springfield's Agnes Stewart Middle School in 2013 learned about "the salmon life cycle, how the fish depend on clean water to survive and what insects they eat." In its twentieth year, Salmon Watch continued to recruit volunteer biologists from EWEB, Oregon's Department of Fish and Wildlife, U.S. Bureau of Land Management and other agencies to help students experience salmon life cycles in Oregon's streams and rivers.

In 2022, Coburg Charter School students visited the Mckenzie River, during the Chinook salmon migration to spawn, "to observe salmon, learn about salmon, and all the different parts of the habitat that work together and line up to create a healthy watershed and space for salmon," according to the youth services coordinator. "They leave the experience with this holistic understanding of how all of these components and all of these elements of healthy watersheds, healthy natural spaces, a healthy environment come together and support one another."

Another program, "Salmon Raising each fall for Eugene 4J," supported by EWEB, works with elementary schools at Triangle Lake.

On average, 800 students participate in Lane County Salmon Watch each year on field trips hosted in the McKenzie and Siuslaw Watersheds. In 2024, students from Agnes Stewart Middle School in Springfield learned about "salmon biology, water quality, vegetation and other life found in the river." Their teacher said, "I refer back to it throughout the year. We do ecology a couple of times in our science curriculum and also human impacts on the environment — how humans are part of their ecosystem and how we depend on the same things that the salmon do." The program coordinator commented,"We're all joining together in this kind of mysterious, magical process of fish spawning, a salmon spawning... If you're not the biggest salmon expert, or if you are the biggest salmon expert, there's a level of intrigue to this process. These fish have had a long life, and they fought really hard to be here, and they're the successful ones."

The McKenzie Watershed Council in 2026 noted, "Through hands-on stream-side participation, the Lane County Salmon Watch program instills deeper understanding of each person's relationship to their local watershed, reconnecting communities to the natural world." The Council also listed Fund Fish Facts, including that Salmon live in both fresh and salt water, and that Oregon's five species are "Chinook, Chum, Coho, Pink, and Sockeye."

=== Linn-Benton County ===
Benton Soil and Water Conservation District sponsors Salmon Watch activities in Alsea.

In 2014, Calapooia Middle School students watched Chinook salmon, learning that spawning precedes death for the salmon. A fish biologist on site told the students, "What sense does it make for parents to die after having children? These fish feed the whole system. They bring back enough nutrients from the ocean to feed the entire ecosystem. They're known as a keystone species."

South Santiam Watershed Council serves the Lebanon Community School District and the Sweet Home School District. In 2016, Westland Middle School sixth graders at the South Santiam River stood 15 feet from a salmon nest (redd) for an close-up look at the spawning grounds. The watched male salmon competing to fertilize eggs, and saw fins and tails of dozens of fish.

=== Grant County ===
In 2001, Monument School students traveled to the John Day River, where the students viewed spawning salmon. Station instructors included a fish biologist from the Oregon Department of Fish and Wildlife, a representative of the Monument Soil and Water Conservation Department on water quality, and an OSU extension agent who spoke on riparian issues. Students learned from a representative of Oregon Trout about macroinvertebrates.

Students from Long Creek School in 2006 worked with an Oregon Trout volunteer, two John Day Water Council staffers and an Oregon Department of Fish and Wildlife biologist, to better understand the ecosystem of the life of salmon. They learned, "...the John Day River is the second longest undammed river in the United States. It is 280 miles and supports four different species of naturally reproducing, native salmonids. The John Day River is unique because it doesn't have any salmon or steelhead hatcheries, yet the salmon and steelhead are the healthiest in the Columbia Basin."

=== Jefferson County ===
In a 2004 visit to the Metolius River in the Upper Deschutes Watershed, thirty students from Sisters Middle School learned how to measure water quality. During the Salmon Watch field trip, they identified where salmon had laid their eggs, collected macroinvertebrate data using nets, watched spawning salmon, and studied the river's ecosystem. The students were able to "...wade into the river's crystal clear water to watch science lessons come to life."

Students from the Rimrock Expeditionary Alternative Learning Middle School journeyed to the Metolius River following the third week of the school year in September, 2006. They took part in measuring water quality by counting the number of macroinvertebrates (that are intolerant of poor water quality), identifying riparian vegetation, and measuring water quality by determining oxygen levels of water samples. Students were fully engaged and involved in first-hand learning that could then be reinforced in the classroom.

In a 2008 visit to the Metolius River, students found yellow stoneflies and dissected a long-dead steelhead trout, "extracting the lens, plunging in and separating out the liver and the heart, and mucking around the fish's thoracic cavity with rubber gloves and courageous curiosity." Another student shook a vial of river water and chemicals "...to measure dissolved oxygen in the Metolius River." Students also learned to take "instream temperature readings, test the clarity and pH." Students drew "renderings of dimcosmoecus (October caddis) and impressionistic sketches of autumn alders."

=== Lincoln County ===
Sponsored by Oregon Trout in 2002, sixth-grade students from Leslie Middle School in Salem at the North Santiam wore polarized sunglasses to watch wild spawning salmon, while learning about watershed conservation and environmental stewardship. Their teacher observed, "The kids come away being jazzed about salmon, but they are equally excited to see that scientists can have cool jobs."

At the North Fork of the Alsea River in 2004, the students' Salmon Watch guide said he hoped that hours spent at the river would inspire the teens from Corvallis High School "to study biology or, at the very least, to become informed about issues related to protecting native salmon." Roberts High School students at the North Santiam in 2008 expressed their enthusiasm for the activities at the river. One student said the best part of his experience was using an under-water camera to shoot video of spawning fish. Another student mentioned the significance of the traumatic life cycle of salmon, that only 5 out of 5,000 salmon would survive the journey to spawn.

=== Marion County ===
The Soil and Water Conservation District of Marion County coordinates field trips for students to witness spawning salmon in action. Students access four learning stations: salmon biology (the life cycle of Pacific Salmon, spawning salmon, and salmon anatomy); aquatic macroinvertebrates and how macros can be used as an indicator of stream health; taking scientific measurements of the stream's water quality, including dissolved oxygen, pH, temperature, and turbidity; and riparian ecology, the living and non-living elements of the stream side habitat, and how the riparian area interconnects with the waterway.

=== Tillamook County ===
The Tillamook Salmon watch program is a joint effort between the Tillamook Junior High School and Tillamook High School science departments. On the Salmon Watch trip in 2016 to the Trask River, students experienced seven 30-minute learning stations: water quality and pH levels, flora in the riparian area, oxygenation in the river water, sediment in the river water, dissecting salmon, invertebrates under a microscope, and how to cast a fishing pole.

=== Yamhill County ===
Outdoor Education Adventures in Yamhill "...provides classroom curriculum, a field trip to a local stream, and options for service learning projects. Teachers are provided ideas, lessons, and resources to help teach about nature, salmon, water quality, and human choices, before and after their field trip."

== See also ==
- Biodiversity
- Conservation biology
- Ecosystem
- Fish migration
- Fresh water
- Habitat conservation
- Natural environment
- Nature conservation
- River ecosystem
- Salmon conservation
- Water resources
- Wild Salmon Center
