= Dmitry Shpilenok =

Russian documentary filmmaker, operator and producer

- Born: Dmitry Petrovich Shpilenok; 27 April 1973 (age 52)
- Occupation(s): Documentary filmmaker, operator, environmental inspector
- Years active: 1996—present
- Awards: Golden Eagle Award (2025)

Dmitry Shpilenok is a Russian documentary filmmaker, operator, and producer. For many years he has also worked as an environmental inspector.

== Biography ==
Dmitry Shpilenok was born in Belaya Berezka village in Bryansk region. He comes from a family of wildlife protectors, his elder brother Igor Shpilenok is world-famous wildlife photographer and founder of the Bryansky Les nature reserve.

In 1991-96 he studied at the Moscow State Art and Cultural University. After graduation he moved to the Bryansky Les to work as a government inspector fighting illegal poaching. During that time he launched his own studio and filmed more than 30 projects about nature reserves of Russia.

In 2007, he moved to Kamchatka to make a documentary about wild salmon. However, he found that it was impossible to film because of massive illegal poaching. He joined the team of his nephew Tikhon Shpilenok who was director of the Kronotsky Nature Reserve. They fought with poacher gangs who enjoyed protection of both local officials and law enforcement. Only after 6 years he returned to his initial project and started filming.

== Filmography ==
In 2015 Shpilenok made Kamchatka bears. Life begins, its concept was created in collaboration with Igor Shpilenok. Dmitry spent 7 months in Kamchatka’s wilderness to film the first steps of bears. The world premiere took place in Finland in 2018, the movie was selected for more than 35 film festivals and got 20 awards.

Shpilenok's next movie Sockeye Salmon, Red Fish was released in 2020. It included footage taken during his inspector years of fighting poachers. Macro scenes of caviar and spawn were made by his brother Nikolay, a wildlife photographer, who put the fish tanks in his house and kept low temperature to create conditions close to natural. The movie entered more than 168 film festivals around the world and received 51 awards.

In March 2020, Shpilenok launched his new project — a documentary about Kamchatka foxes. He plans to film during three seasons and finish in 2022. Three fox families were selected as protagonists. The plot will depend on their real life stories.

In 2021, Shpilenok released a short movie ‘Valley of Geysers’.
