= Uzon =

Caldera in eastern Kamchatka, Russia

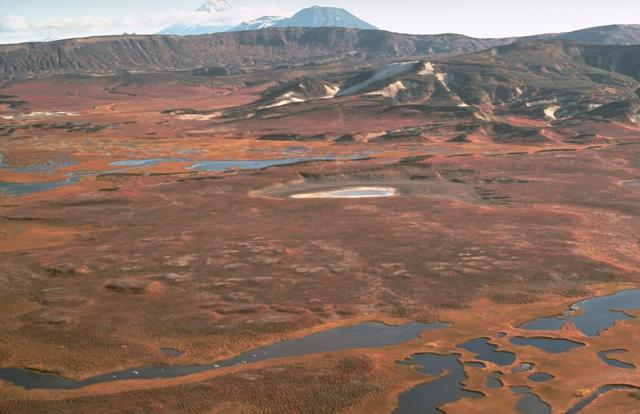
- The Uzon and Geyzernaya calderas. Sharp-peaked Kronotsky volcano and flat-topped Krasheninnikov volcano appear in the distance beyond the north caldera rim.

Highest point
- Elevation: 1,617 m (5,305 ft)
- Coordinates: 54.50°N 159.97°E

Geography
- Location: Kamchatka, Russia

Geology
- Mountain type: Volcanic calderas
- Last eruption: 200 ± 300 years

Uzon (Russian: Узон) is a 9 by 12 km volcanic caldera located in the eastern part of Kamchatka Peninsula, Russia. Together with the Geyzernaya caldera it hosts the largest geothermal field in the Kamchatka Peninsula. The calderas were formed in the mid-Pleistocene in several large eruptions that deposited 20–25 km^{3} of ignimbrite over a wide area. Lake Dalny fills a Holocene maar in the northeast of Uzon Caldera.

The Uzon Caldera is a location of the occurrence of extremophile micro-organisms due to its high localized temperatures.(C.Michael Hogan. 2010)

Michael Palin visited Uzon in the first episode of his 1997 travelogue series, Full Circle with Michael Palin.

== See also ==
- List of volcanoes in Russia
