= Krasheninnikov (volcano) =

Volcano in Kamchatka peninsula, Russia

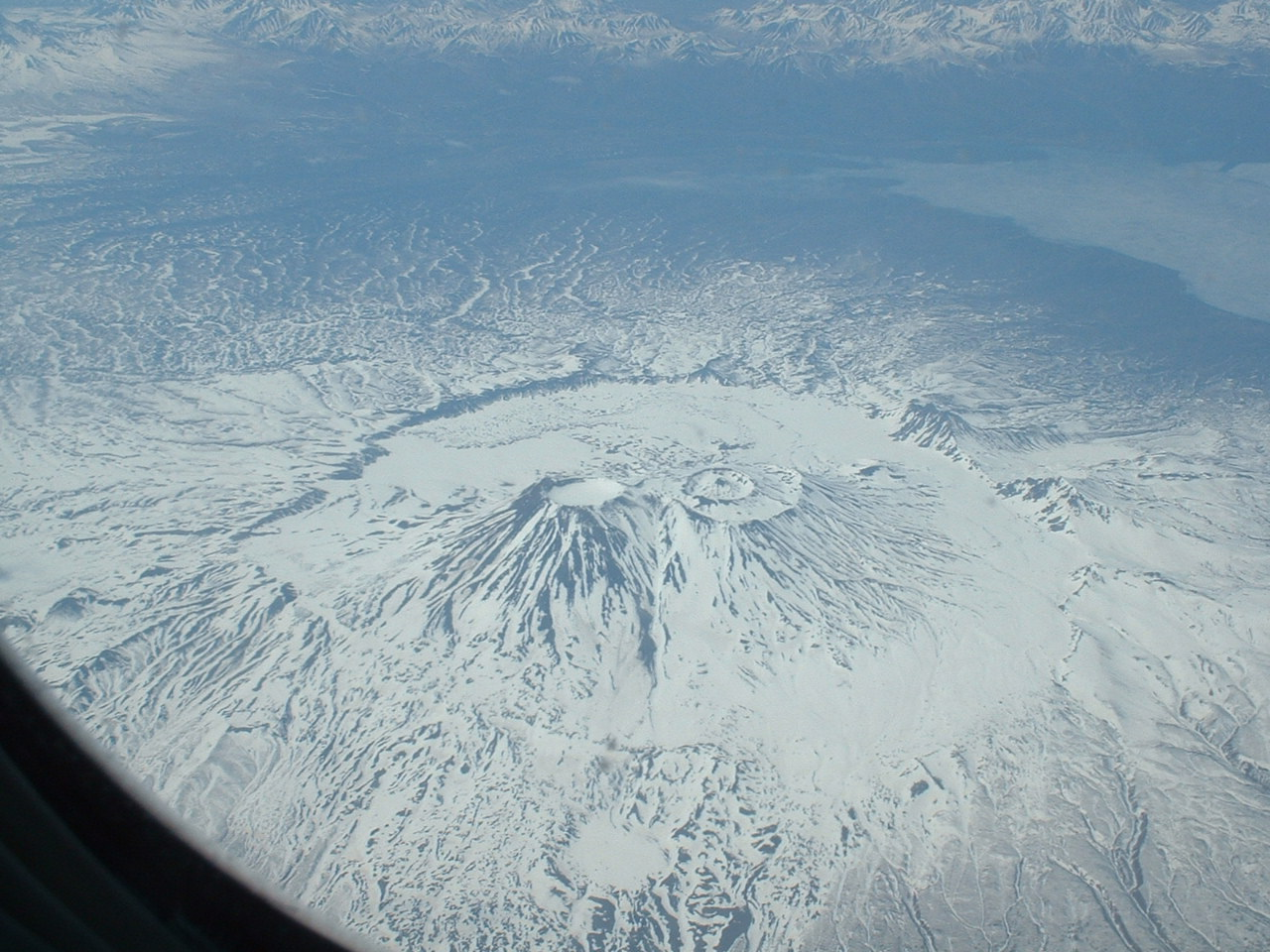

Highest point
- Elevation: 1,816 m (5,958 ft)
- Prominence: 1,085 m (3,560 ft)
- Listing: List of volcanoes in Russia
- Coordinates: 54°35′36″N 160°16′24″E

Geography
- Location within Far Eastern Federal District Location within Kamchatka Krai
- Location: Kamchatka, Russia
- Parent range: Eastern Range

Geology
- Mountain type: Stratovolcanoes
- Last eruption: August 3, 2025 – ongoing

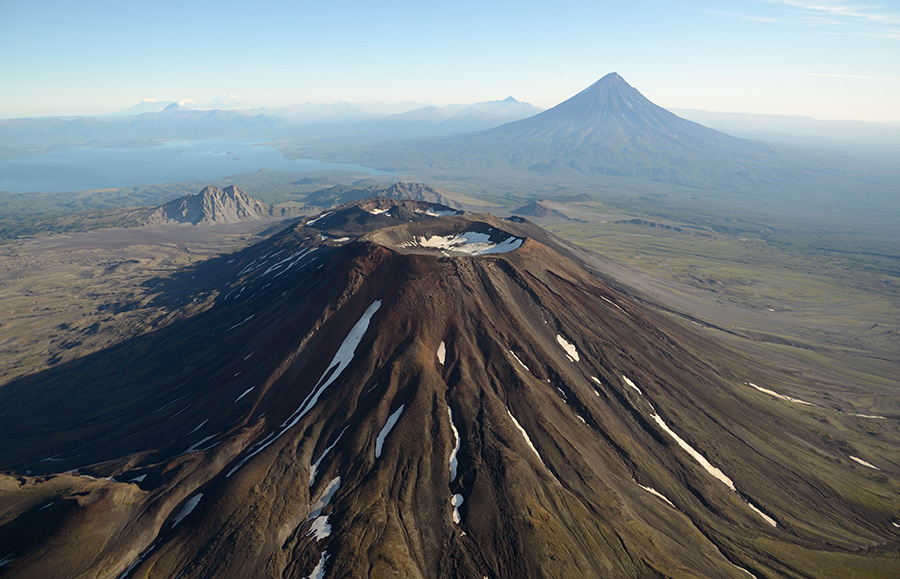
Krasheninnikov volcano, with Lake Kronotskoye and Kronotsky volcano in the background

Krasheninnikov (Russian: Крашенинников) is a complex of two overlapping stratovolcanoes inside a large caldera on the eastern coast of Kamchatka Peninsula, Russia. It is located in Kronotsky Nature Reserve to the south of Lake Kronotskoye, and is named after explorer Stepan Krasheninnikov.

== Geology ==
The Kuril-Kamchatka volcanic arc contains more than 60 recently active volcanoes. The massif of the Krasheninnikov volcano contains two overlapping stratovolcanoes made up of three edifices, with the most recent historic partial cone off the northern cone being called the mid-North cone. According to the Smithsonian Institution's Global Volcanism Program, the volcano's last eruption before 2025 was dated to 1550 using tephrochronology.

The tephra from the caldera's forming eruption lies on top of material from another volcano's eruption of 39,000 years ago, and has recently been dated to be 30,000 years old when about 13 km^{3} (3.1 cu mi) of eruptive volume was deposited up to 200 km (120 mi) to the north. The southern of the two cones is older and developed over a 4,500-year period beginning 11,000 years ago. The northern cone which has erupted andesitic lavas and tephra started forming after the southern cone was complete with most being deposited 2200–2400 years ago. Another sample of Krasheninnikov's eruptive products has proved to be dacite.

== Recent activity ==
The first event to be observed since the 1550 eruption occurred on 3 August 2025, just four days after the 2025 Kamchatka Peninsula earthquake. The earthquake is believed to have triggered the eruption, due to the shaking Krasheninikov experienced
