= North Coast State Forest Coalition =

Organization in Oregon, United States

- Formation: 2011
- Type: Nonprofit organization
- Purpose: Balanced forest management
- Region served: Northwest Oregon, Tillamook and Clatsop State Forests
- Website: www.forestlegacy.org

The North Coast State Forest Coalition (NCSFC) is a coalition of non-profit organizations in Oregon that works to protect wild salmon, steelhead, trout, terrestrial species, and the ecosystems on which these species depend. The NCSFC also advocates for recreational opportunities. The coalition is focused on improving the management of the Tillamook State Forest and Clatsop State Forest in northwest Oregon. The core members of the coalition are Wild Salmon Center, Association of Northwest Steelheaders, Oregon Council of Trout Unlimited, Oregon Chapter of Sierra Club, Pacific Rivers, Native Fish Society, and Northwest Guides and Anglers Association.

== High value conservation areas ==
The North Coast State Forest Coalition was created in 2011 when Oregon Governor John Kitzhaber called for the creation of "visible and durable" conservation areas on Oregon state forest lands. In 2012, under grassroots and grasstops pressure created by the NCSFC, the Oregon Board of Forestry went into rulemaking to create High Value Conservation Areas. In 2013, the Board approved the new designation and in 2014 over 100,000 acres (40,000 ha) of the Tillamook State Forest and Clatsop State Forest were designated, including riparian buffers and parcels prioritizing terrestrial habit.

== Arcadia cedar ==
In 2013 the Clatsop County Board of Commissioners passed a resolution requesting that the Oregon Department of Forestry protect Oregon's largest tree, the Arcadia Cedar, which is located in Clatsop County on public Board of Forestry land. The tree, a Western red cedar, has been identified as Oregon's largest tree by Ascending the Giants based on its height, trunk diameter, and crown spread. The North Coast State Forest Coalition helped bring attention to the tree, which is on the Oregon Department of Forestry's Land Acquisition and Exchange Plan for potential trade to a logging company.

== See also ==
- Salmon conservation
- Conservation biology
- Wildlife conservation
- Outdoor recreation
