= OWT =

OWT may refer to:

- Oregon Water Trust, a non-profit organization in Oregon that merged with Oregon Trout to form The Freshwater Trust
- Offshore wind turbine
- One-way travel
- One World Trust, a British non-profit organization based in London

== See also ==
- Owt, Yorkshire slang for "anything"
