= Association of Northwest Steelheaders =

- Association of Northwest Steelheaders Inc.
- Abbreviation: ANWS
- Formation: 1960; 65 years ago
- Type: Nonprofit
- Tax ID no.: 91-1031100
- Legal status: 501(c)(3)
- Headquarters: Portland, Oregon
- Website: https://nwsteelheaders.org/

The Association of Northwest Steelheaders (ANWS) is the largest angling conservation organization headquartered in Oregon, United States. With approximately one thousand members and supporters worldwide, it operates primarily through its volunteers. ANWS's headquarters is located in Milwaukie, a suburb of Portland.

== History ==
ANWS was founded in 1960 by four avid fishermen in the Portland, Oregon area. Its three main areas of focus are conservation, education and restoration of fish habitat. ANWS unites anglers, sportsmen, conservationists, outdoor enthusiasts, educators, researchers and others, bringing together a broad spectrum of people who share a concern for watersheds and habitat. Chapters from across the state work independently, with other similar organizations and the State of Oregon to accomplish their goals.

== Services ==
ANWS offers the following services to individuals, organizations, and chapters: conservation training, leadership training, educational training, information outreach, and networking opportunities. ANWS is the Oregon affiliate of the National Wildlife Federation.

ANWS's specific conservation priorities include seeking solutions to global warming, reducing mercury pollution, strengthening the Endangered Species Act, combating invasive species, restoring Oregon's waterways, reforming the Army Corps of Engineers and educating future environmental stewards.

== Current programs ==
ANWS continues its involvement in the environmental issues facing the state and the surrounding states that directly impact watersheds, particularly in the areas of stewardship, water quality, dam removal and stream bed conservation. As part of its efforts to protect fish habitat in Oregon, the Wild Salmon Center is a member of the North Coast State Forest Coalition.
