= Kurils Nature Reserve =

Russian strict nature reserve in the Kuril Islands

- Russian: Курильский заповедник (Also: Kurilsky)
- IUCN category Ia (strict nature reserve)
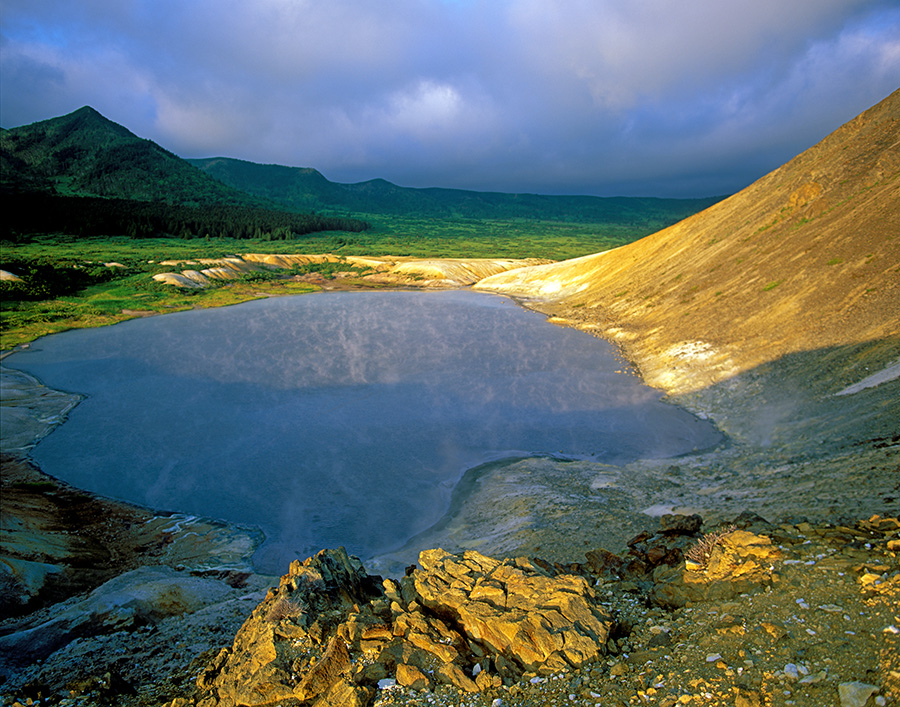
- Boiling Lake in the Golovnin caldera on Kunashir Island

- Location within Russia
- Location: Sakhalin Oblast
- Nearest city: Yuzhno-Kurilsk
- Coordinates: 45°5′0″N 145°59′0″E
- Area: 65,364 hectares (161,518 acres; 252 sq mi)
- Established: 1984
- Governing body: Ministry of Natural Resources and Environment (Russia)
- Website: http://www.kurilskiy.ru/

Kurils Nature Reserve (Russian: Курильский заповедник) (also Kurilsky) is a Russian 'zapovednik' (strict ecological reserve) covering the north and south portions of Kunashir Island, the largest and most southernmost of the Kuril Islands, which stretch between Hokkaido Island in Japan to the Kamchatka peninsula in the Russia Far East. It also covers two smaller islands nearby to the southeast. The area is one of the largest wintering sites for coastal seabirds. The reserve sits on a tectonically unstable location, and is one of two Russian national reserves (with Kronotsky Nature Reserve) that protects territory of active volcanoes. The reserve is situated in the Yuzhno-Kurilsky District of Sakhalin Oblast. The reserve was created in 1984, and covers an area of 65,364 ha (252.37 sq mi).

== Topography ==
The Kurilsky Reserve consists of three separate sectors:

- North Kunashir (49,899 hectares (192.66 sq mi)). Covers the northern part of Kunashir Island. The northwestern area of this sector is the foothills of the Dokuchaeva Mountain Ridge. The sector includes by Mt. Ruruy (Russian: Руруй) (1,485 metres (4,872 ft)), a complex stratovolcano. The southeastern area of the sector ranges from the volcano Father Mountain ("Tyatya") (1819 m) to the coastal terrace at 30–50 meters above sea level. Tyatya is considered to be a classic example of a Somma volcano, where the summit has collapsed into a caldera that contains a new central cone.
- South Kunashir (15,366 hectares (59.33 sq mi)) This sector, on the southern part of Kunashir, differs from the north with smoother relief and less height differential. The central part of the sector includes a caldera volcano, Mt. Golovnin (541 m), the bottom of which has two hot and boiling mineralized lakes.
- The Lesser Kuril Ridge (100 hectares (0.39 sq mi)) This sector is two very small islands ("Shards" and "Demin"). It is characterized by the presence of small areas and the height of the islands with signs of considerable denudation, which are a continuation of the peninsula geomorphological Nemuro (a. Hokkaido).

The Kurils Reserve (red) covers the northern and southern areas of Kunashir Island, and portions of the Lesser Kunashir Islands to the southeast.

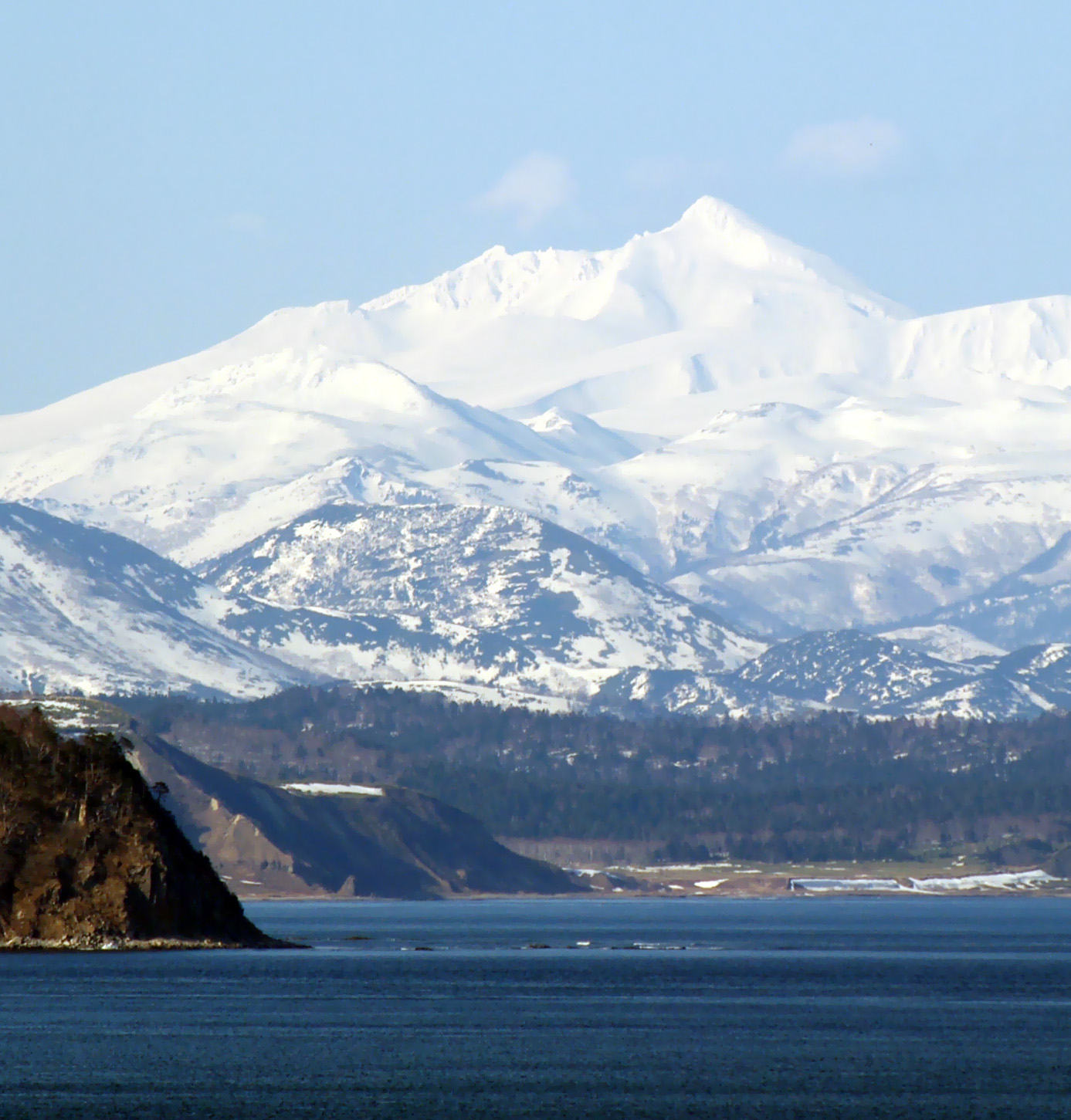
Stratovolcano Mt. Ruruy; view from the urban village Yuzhno-Kurilsk

== Climate and ecoregion ==
Kurils is located in the South Sakhalin-Kurile mixed forests ecoregion. This is a small ecoregion covering the southern tip of Sakalin Island in the Russian Far East, and the Kuril Islands closest to Japan that stretch to the northeast of the island of Hokkaido. It is a region of very high biodiversity, with over 1,350 species of vascular plants recorded. It generally has the flora of the Russian mainland and the fauna of Hokkaido.

The climate of Kurils is Subarctic climate, without dry season (Köppen climate classification Subarctic climate (Dfc)). This climate is characterized by mild summers (only 1–3 months above 10 °C (50.0 °F)) and cold, snowy winters (coldest month below −3 °C (26.6 °F)).

== Flora and fauna ==
Approximately 70% of the reserve is forested, mostly with coniferous trees. Common trees include Jezo spruce (Picea jezoensis), Sakhalin spruce (Picea glehnii, and Sakhalin fir (Abies sachalinensis). Much of the understory is heavy thickets of creeping bamboo, bushes and vines. The sea coast has thickets of Japanese rose (Rosa rugosa). Scientists on the reserve have recorded 838 species of vascular plants from 414 genera.

The animal life of the reserve reflects the unique habits of the island. The endangered sea otter is a resident. Characteristics mammals of the forests are brown bear, fox, hare, chipmunk, sable and weasels. The coastal marine mammals include seals and sea lions. Scientists on the reserve have recorded 28 species of mammals. Among lizards, the Far Eastern skink is only found on the island. The reserve is a part of globally important transcontinental flyway for bird migration to the arctic. Hundreds of thousands of colonial seabirds, including cormorants, ducks, loons, gulls, and auks, winter in the area around the reserve. 278 species of birds have been recorded, with 125 nesting. The reserve reports 26 nesting pairs of the endangered Blakiston's fish owl (Bubo blakistoni).

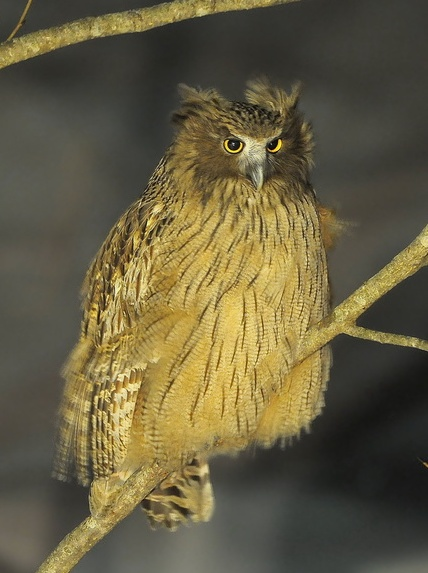
Blakiston's fish owl (endangered)

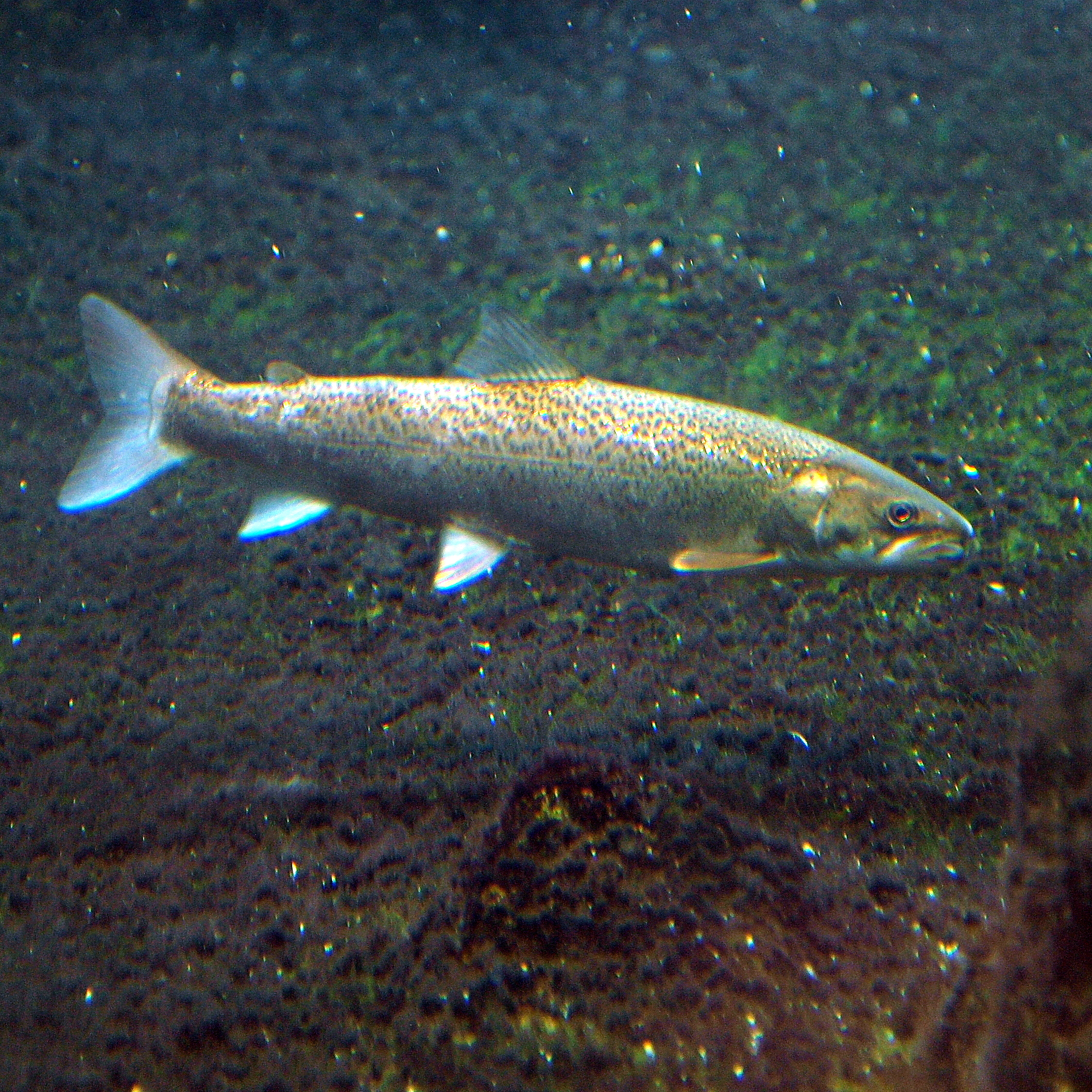
Sakhalin taimen (Critically endangered)

== Ecoeducation and access ==
As a strict nature reserve, the Kurils Reserve is mostly closed to the general public, although scientists and those with 'environmental education' purposes can make arrangements with park management for visits. The territory of the Kurils Reserve is the subject of a territorial dispute between Russia and Japan. The southern sector of the reserve is 20 km from the Japanese coast. Access is not easy and arrangements, particularly for foreigners, must be carefully made in advance. The main office is in the village of Yuzhno-Kurilsk on Kunashir island, about 20 km northeast of the southern sector of the reserve.

== See also ==
- List of Russian Nature Reserves (class 1a 'zapovedniks')
- National parks of Russia
- Protected areas of Russia
