= Columbia Plateau =

Plateau in Washington, Oregon, and Idaho in the United States

Coordinates: 45°59′58″N 119°00′05″W

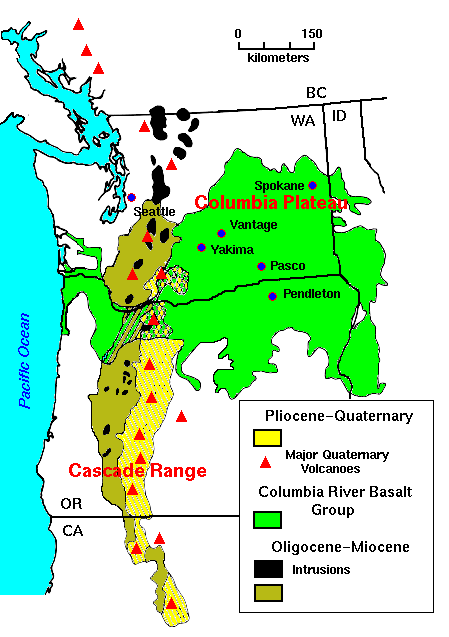
The Columbia Plateau covers much of the Columbia River Basalt Group, shown in green on this map. The Washington cities of Spokane, Yakima and Pasco, and the Oregon city of Pendleton, lie on the Columbia Plateau.

The Columbia Plateau is an important geologic and geographic region that lies across parts of the U.S. states of Washington, Oregon, and Idaho. It is a wide flood basalt plateau between the Cascade Range and the Rocky Mountains, cut through by the Columbia River.

== Geology ==
During late Miocene and early Pliocene times, a flood basalt engulfed about 63,000 square miles (160,000 km^{2}) of the Pacific Northwest, forming a large igneous province. Over a period of perhaps 10 to 15 million years, lava flow after lava flow poured out, ultimately accumulating to a thickness of more than 6,000 feet (1.8 km). As the molten rock came to the surface, the Earth's crust gradually sank into the space left by the rising lava. The Columbia River with the Basalt Group consists of seven formations: The Steens Basalt, Imnaha Basalt, Grande Ronde Basalt, Picture Gorge Basalt, Prineville Basalt, Wanapum Basalt, and Saddle Mountains Basalt. Many of these formations are subdivided into formal and informal members and flows.

The subsidence of the crust produced a large, slightly depressed lava plateau. The ancient Columbia River was forced into its present course by the northwesterly advancing lava. The lava, as it flowed over the area, first filled the stream valleys, forming dams that in turn caused impoundments or lakes. Entities found in these lake beds include fossil leaf impressions, petrified wood, fossil insects, and bones of vertebrate animals.

Evidence suggests that some concentrated heat source is melting rock beneath the Columbia Plateau Province at the base of the lithosphere (the layer of crust and upper mantle that forms Earth's moving tectonic plates). In an effort to figure out why this area, far from a plate boundary, had such an enormous outpouring of lava, scientists established hardening dates for many of the individual lava flows. They found that the youngest volcanic rocks were clustered near the Yellowstone Plateau and that the farther west they went, the older the lavas.

Although scientists are still gathering evidence, a probable explanation is that a hot spot, an extremely hot plume of deep mantle material, is rising to the surface beneath the Columbia Plateau Province. Beneath Hawaii and Iceland, a temperature instability develops (for reasons not yet well understood) at the boundary between the core and mantle. The concentrated heat triggers a plume hundreds of kilometers in diameter that ascends directly through to the surface of the Earth.

The track of this hot spot starts in the west and sweeps up to Yellowstone National Park. The steaming fumaroles and explosive geysers are ample evidence of a concentration of heat beneath the surface. The hotspot is stationary, but the North American plate is moving over it, creating a superb record of the rate and direction of plate motion.

== Flora ==
Part of the Columbia Plateau is associated with the Columbia Plateau ecoregion, part of the "Nearctic temperate and subtropical grasslands, savannas, and shrublands" ecoregion of the temperate grasslands, savannas, and shrublands biome.

== Geography ==
Washington cities in the Columbia Plateau include:

- Colfax
- Davenport
- Ellensburg
- Reardan
- Kennewick
- Moses Lake
- Pasco
- Pullman
- Richland
- Spokane
- Walla Walla
- Yakima
- Goldendale
- Deer Park
- Othello
- Warden
- Lind

Oregon cities in the Columbia Plateau include:

- Athena
- Hermiston
- Hood River
- Pendleton
- The Dalles
- Milton-Freewater

Idaho cities in the Columbia Plateau include:

- Coeur d'Alene
- Lewiston
- Moscow

== See also ==
- Cascade-Sierra province
- Channeled scablands
- Columbia Plateau Aquifer System
- Grand Coulee
- Interior Plateau
- High Desert (Oregon)
