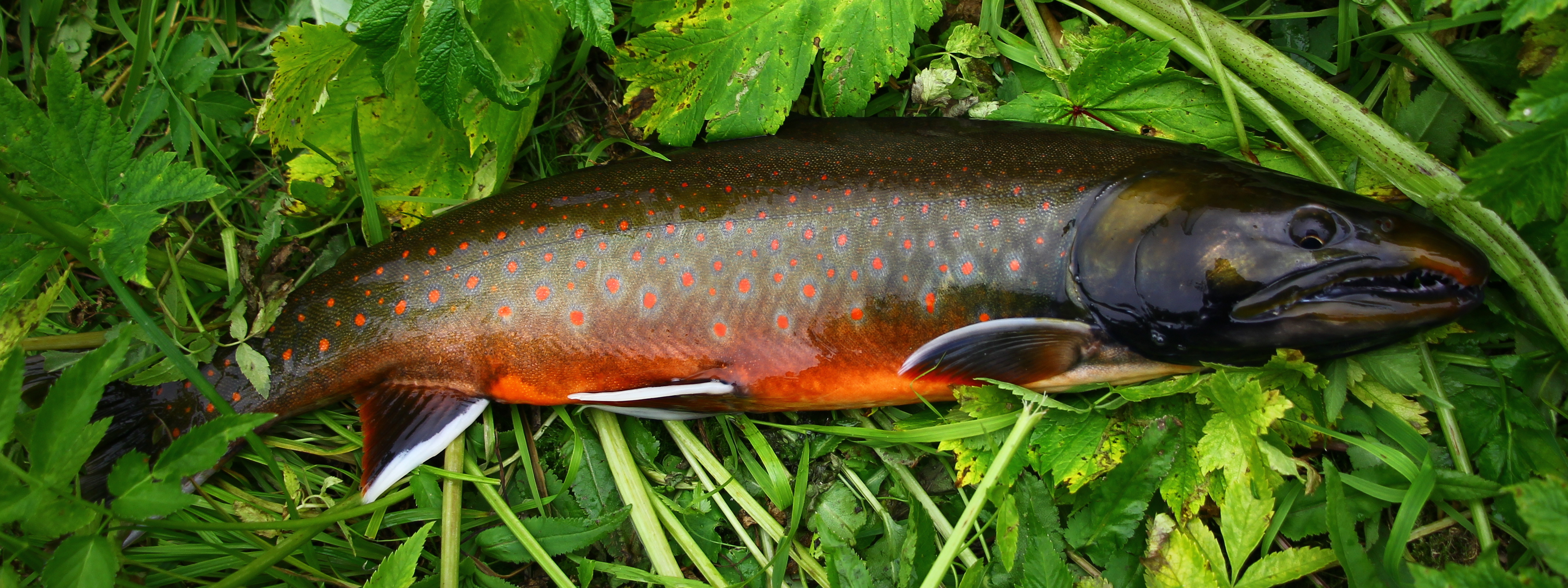

Scientific classification
- Kingdom: Animalia
- Phylum: Chordata
- Class: Actinopterygii
- Order: Salmoniformes
- Family: Salmonidae
- Genus: Salvelinus
- Species: S. kronocius

Binomial name
- Salvelinus kronocius Viktorovsky, 1978

= Salvelinus kronocius =

Species of fish

Salvelinus kronocius, also known in Russian as the "long-headed char" (Длинноголовый голец), is a species of bony fish in the family Salmonidae. It is found only in lake Kronotskoye, Kamchatka Peninsula, Russian Federation. The fish grows up to 65 cm (26 in).
