= Salmon conservation =

Protection of salmon populations

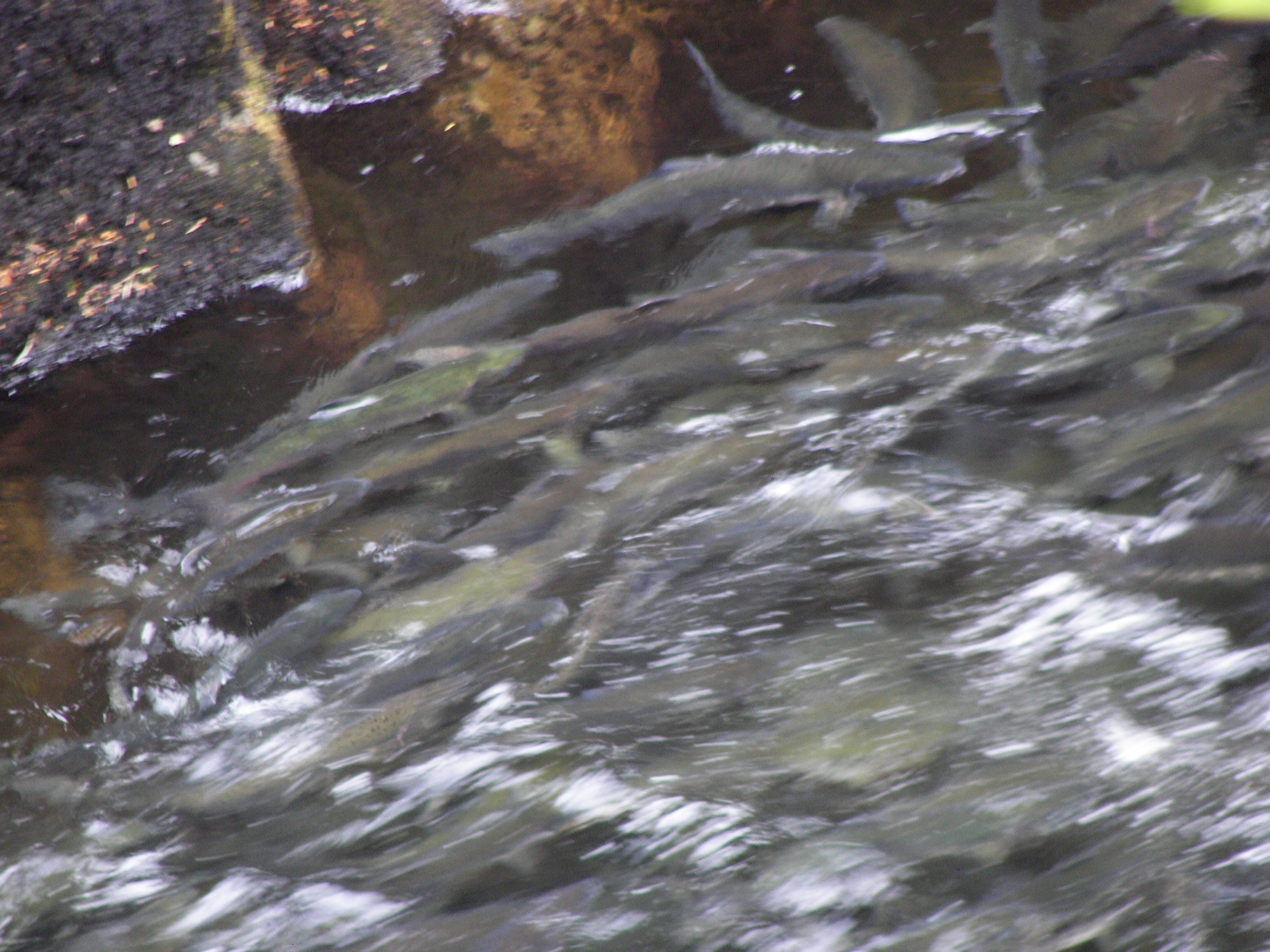
Salmon swimming upstream in a river in Alaska

Salmon conservation comprises the policies, management practices, and restoration efforts used to protect and recover salmon populations and the habitats on which they depend. Salmon are anadromous fish whose survival depends on suitable freshwater habitat for spawning and rearing, as well as functioning estuaries and marine environments. This habitat has been degraded across much of the species' range by land development, timber harvest, dam construction, and other human activities. In response, governments, Indigenous tribes, scientists, and conservation organizations have pursued measures ranging from fish hatcheries and habitat restoration to the removal of dams blocking historical spawning grounds.

== History of salmon decline ==
Wild salmon in California, Oregon, Washington, Idaho, and southern British Columbia have been on a more than 160-year downward trend and are now at very low levels.Efforts to reverse the decline have been extensive and expensive, but have not met with much success.

In the contiguous United States, wild salmon face a trajectory comparable to other iconic North American wildlife such as the wolf, the California condor, the grizzly bear, and the bison: species not at risk of complete disappearance, but reduced to small, remnant populations within a much larger historical range. In California, Oregon, Idaho, Washington, and southern British Columbia, many runs are reduced to less than 10% of their historical numbers; some have disappeared. Many salmon runs are dominated by hatchery-bred fish. In the Columbia River, once one of the largest salmon producers, over 80% of the total run is now hatchery-bred fish.

This decline is not unique to western North America. Salmon runs have also historically existed in the Far East, in Atlantic Europe, and in eastern North America, and in each of those regions runs have already been extirpated or greatly reduced. Absent a substantial change in current trends, fisheries scientists consider it likely that West Coast runs will follow the same trajectory. Numerous factors have driven the decline since the late 1840s, and numerous specific barriers have so far prevented recovery; throughout the region, many distinct salmon stocks (genetically distinct, interbreeding populations) have declined, and some have vanished entirely.

The status of salmon along the west coast of North America is not uniform. Some wild salmon and habitat restoration possibilities are better than others. There are still relatively healthy runs of wild salmon (and habitat) in some locations, such as the coastal watersheds of Northern California, Oregon, Washington, and some areas of southern British Columbia. Runs in northern British Columbia, Yukon, and Alaska are in much better condition.

== Past policy choices ==
1820–1840 — European and American trappers began an intensive harvest of beaver in the Pacific Northwest in the early 19th century. Beaver dams and ponds tend to improve conditions for salmon rearing, so the decline of beaver populations is thought to have affected salmon runs as well. Amid competition between the United States and Britain for control of the region, the Hudson's Bay Company pursued a policy of trapping out beaver in areas it controlled, on the theory that American trappers and settlers would have less reason to move into a region already stripped of fur-bearing animals. The resulting effect on West Coast salmon has not been quantified, though it is presumed to have been substantial.

1848 — The discovery of gold in California is often cited as a turning point in the long decline of West Coast wild salmon. Newspapers began reporting falling salmon numbers within a year of the discovery, and by the 1850s overharvest combined with the physical disruption of mining had severely depleted salmon streams in and around California's Central Valley. Regulators subsequently restricted some fishing and mining practices, and calls soon followed for salmon hatcheries to offset the losses caused by mining.

1870–1900 — After three decades of declining salmon runs in California's Central Valley, both fisheries professionals and the public had largely settled on hatchery stocking as the preferred remedy. By the turn of the century, this reliance on artificial propagation had effectively displaced habitat protection or restoration as the dominant recovery strategy.

1905–1939 — Public policy in the early 20th century favored converting the Klamath Basin, along the Oregon–California border, into irrigated farmland, a goal consistent with the priorities of the period. Where irrigated agriculture and salmon conservation competed for water and land, agriculture generally prevailed. Federal and state governments subsequently spent large sums building dams and canal systems throughout the Klamath Basin and other western watersheds.

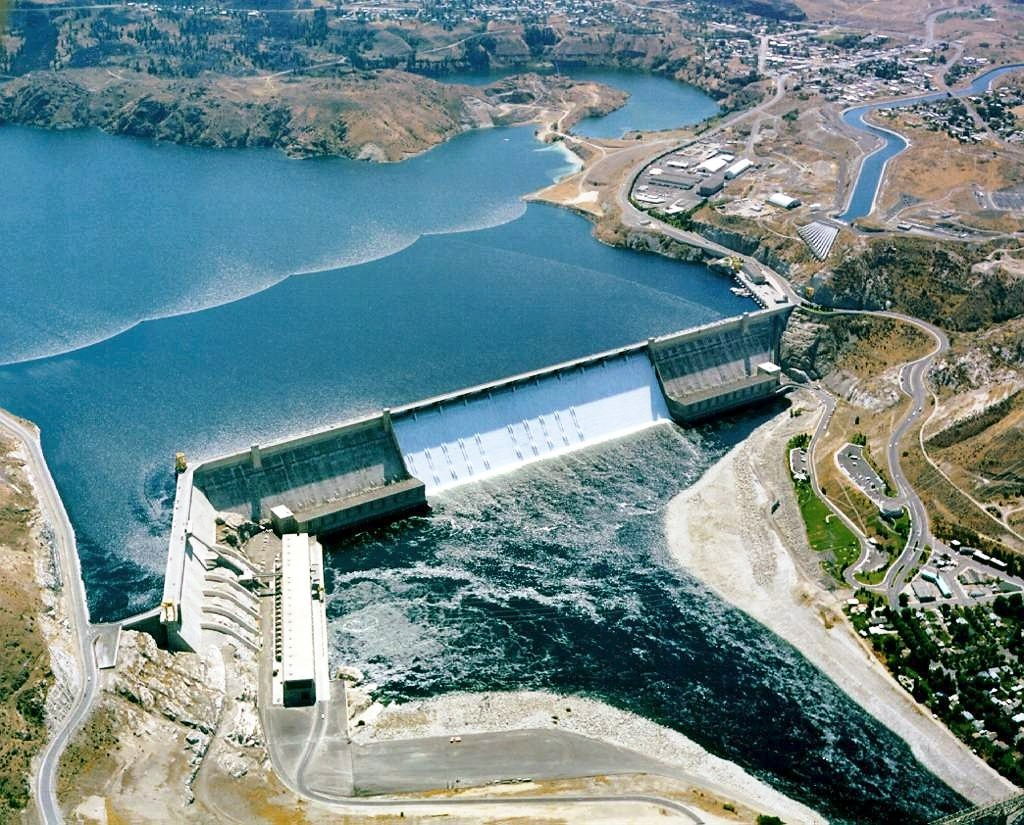
Grand Coulee Dam, completed in 1941, permanently blocked salmon from about a quarter of the Columbia River Basin.

1929–39 — During the Great Depression, public works employment became a dominant policy priority, and large federal dam-building projects — including the high dams of the Columbia Basin — proceeded despite recognition that they would severely harm wild salmon runs. Grand Coulee Dam alone permanently blocked roughly a quarter of the Columbia River Basin to migrating salmon, eliminating salmon access to about a thousand miles of the mainstem river.

1941–45 — Wartime demand for warplanes drove a rapid increase in aluminum production, which required more electrical generation in the Pacific Northwest. Hydroelectric turbines ran at maximum capacity around the clock for four years, and the resulting operating conditions caused substantial salmon mortality. Wartime production needs took priority over salmon protection.

1948 — Severe regional flooding led to public pressure for flood control, and government agencies responded by constructing numerous flood-control dams across Washington, Oregon, Idaho, and British Columbia in the years that followed, prioritizing protection of life and property over unimpeded river flow.

1955–65 — Affordable home and commercial air conditioning spread rapidly in the two decades after World War II. Its adoption affected salmon indirectly in two ways: it raised regional electricity demand, and it made previously less desirable, hot-summer areas more attractive to live in, contributing to regional population growth. Because electricity demand rose in both summer and winter, utilities required more generating capacity and transmission infrastructure, adding further pressure on the river system.

1991–2011 — The first salmon "distinct population segment" was listed under terms of the Endangered Species Act. With this action, the policy debate shifted away from restoring salmon runs in order to support fishing, to protecting salmon runs from extinction, two very different policy objectives. A century ago there was not much concern over whether a salmon started life in a hatchery or in a stream. Some fisheries scientists now regard hatchery-produced salmon as part of the restoration problem rather than the solution.

2001 — A severe drought in California that year, combined with the state's electricity supply crisis, led the Bonneville Power Administration to declare a power emergency. The agency departed from previously agreed interagency targets for salmon-supporting flow releases and used water that had been reserved for salmon migration to generate power for transmission to California.

== Traditional protections ==
Traditionally salmon habitats have not been protected until they are severely degraded and the run is nearing extinction. At that time, several steps might be taken to restore the population. Fish hatcheries are a popular short-term remedy. Rahr and Augerot argue that hatcheries can mask underlying habitat problems rather than address them. Other methods of conservation may include limiting or eliminating harvests of the run, protecting water quality or reducing water extraction for human consumption, and protecting the habitat. In the last 20 years, Washington State Fisheries, in cooperation with local tribes, has decreased the Puget Sound salmon harvest by as much as 90%.

Protection of habitat is addressed in a core/satellite model in which certain areas are identified as highly used "core" areas and less valuable "satellite" areas. This model assumes that not all potential habitats will be used by the salmon. The problem with this method is that the reaches between the core and satellite areas are given a low intrinsic potential, which may result in a lower priority for protection. If these corridors become impassable due to damming or destruction of riparian habitat, the corresponding satellite region is lost as habitat. If several of these reaches go unprotected, the total habitat area for the salmon can quickly dwindle. Rahr and Augerot regard this as a losing strategy that could lead to the extinction of salmon.

== Proactive sanctuary strategy ==
A new method of conservation has been put forward by Rahr and Augerot of the Wild Salmon Center. Their method takes a broader stance at protecting salmon habitat. Instead of using the core/satellite approach, they propose protecting entire river basins as whole systems. They call this the "Proactive Sanctuary Strategy", which aims to preserve stream habitats of particularly high value, areas considered "salmon strongholds". In the heavily populated southern part of the salmon's range, from southern British Columbia to California, Rahr and Augerot estimate there are unlikely to be more than four to six river basins that could qualify as full sanctuaries. They describe these high-value basins as irreplaceable and argue that they should be protected while still largely pristine. Basins or "strongholds" in this category are expected to be able to sustain themselves for the next 100 years. This method is not meant to be a replacement to the currently ongoing protections afforded by local, state, and federal governments, such as the methods discussed above. Instead, it is a proactive method to reduce or prevent the need for these other methods.

The idea for this "headwaters to the sea" strategy was first proposed in 1892. Due to the success of hatcheries on American rivers, the idea did not gain any momentum at the time. The idea was revived in the early 1990s when conservationists realized the shortcomings and lack of coordination between efforts by federal, state, and local authorities. The agencies in charge of the fisheries such as NOAA often lack the authority to act on existing threats. The new conceptualization of salmon habitat conservation posited that the most intact or valuable drainages should be protected first, working from the headwaters downstream to create a continuous corridor of protected habitat. Several of these sub-basin scale refuges would come together to protect an entire basin as a whole unit. This does not mean that all of the land will be owned by governments or conservation organizations. The plan envisions both public and private landowners working together on a sub-basin scale to preserve habitat. This goal will be met using three main principles. The first aims to create "a series of intact and diverse (in terms of life histories, genetics, and species) Pacific salmon populations in full basin sanctuaries." These populations could be a source of individuals to transplant to other rivers if needed. The second principle aims to "Ensure the maintenance of functional habitat connectivity from the headwaters to the estuary." This connection of habitat helps to promote diversity in the population by providing several localized spawning locations. The final principle establishes a "system of strongholds (regional priority sub-basins)" which would contain the most biologically significant populations and habitats.

These principles could be used to create the sub-basin strongholds and basin sanctuaries discussed above. In regions where the habitat is currently highly fragmented due to high human populations, it may only be possible to create sub-basin level protections. These areas include the regions at the southern end of the extent of salmon habitat such as northern California, where Rahr and Augerot expect no more than four to six river basins to qualify as full sanctuaries. Full basin sanctuaries are considered more feasible in sparsely populated areas such as northern British Columbia and Alaska. These areas could be mixed use so as to provide value to local populations as well as salmon populations. Mixed use would have limits though. Such limits may include exclusions from areas of great value to salmon such as ideal spawning grounds or places where young fish may be vulnerable. Strongholds would be determined by the value and practicality of connecting the often more intact headwaters with the often disturbed estuary zones.

This relatively new method of conservation does not advocate for the elimination of current conservation methods. Instead, it builds a foundation for future salmon habitat that does not need such restoration and restriction. Rahr and Augerot acknowledge that implementing these goals would require funding well beyond historical levels for salmon conservation, which they argue would be offset by long-term benefits. Until such funding materializes, smaller-scale projects like the one adopted in Puget Sound represent an intermediate step between older and newer approaches.

== Puget Sound salmon recovery plan ==
In 2007, the National Marine Fisheries Service adopted a new plan for the recovery of salmon in Puget Sound. It is estimated that currently 10% of the historic salmon runs still exist in the region. Some individual runs have diminished to just one percent. The newly adopted plan combines specific efforts on the watershed level with more general legislation at the state level. Focusing on watershed level management is similar to the ideas presented by Rahr et al., except that in the Puget Sound plan, all watersheds, no matter their value, have developed a plan of action. However, by allowing each watershed group to customize their plan for conservation, higher value regions can adopt more of the principles set forth by Rahr et al. Lower value watersheds will use more traditional methods to reach citizens and educate them about the ecology of their streams.

Rahr and Augerot argue that a strategy of this scale may ultimately be necessary to maintain wild salmon populations, though they acknowledge its cost and scope could delay implementation. The Puget Sound Salmon Recovery Plan currently serves as a smaller-scale alternative. Combining existing sanctuary methods with legislative action and community participation is intended to support the recovery of salmon habitats in the region.

== Floodplain rearing ==
Studies of California rivers have found that juvenile Chinook salmon grow faster on seasonally inundated floodplains than in adjacent river channels, where shallow, sun-warmed water supports abundant invertebrate prey.

The Nigiri Project, begun in 2012 on the Yolo Bypass floodplain near Davis, California, applied this idea by flooding fallow rice fields in winter to rear juvenile salmon. Fish from the flooded fields grew markedly faster than those in the adjacent river, reaching 3 to 3.5 inches (7.6 to 8.9 cm) compared with about 2 inches (5.1 cm) for river fish of the same age. A peer-reviewed study of the 2012 experiment found free-swimming juveniles grew about 0.70 mm per day, among the highest growth rates recorded in fresh water in California. The project was a collaboration of California Trout, the University of California, Davis Center for Watershed Sciences, and state water and wildlife agencies.

== Pulse flows ==
Timed releases of cold water from a dam, known as pulse flows, are used to simulate rainfall and attract adult salmon upstream to spawn. On the Mokelumne River, the East Bay Municipal Utility District used pulse flows during the 2012–2015 California drought; in the fall of 2014, 12,118 Chinook salmon returned to the river, its fifth-largest run in 74 years.

== Hatcheries ==
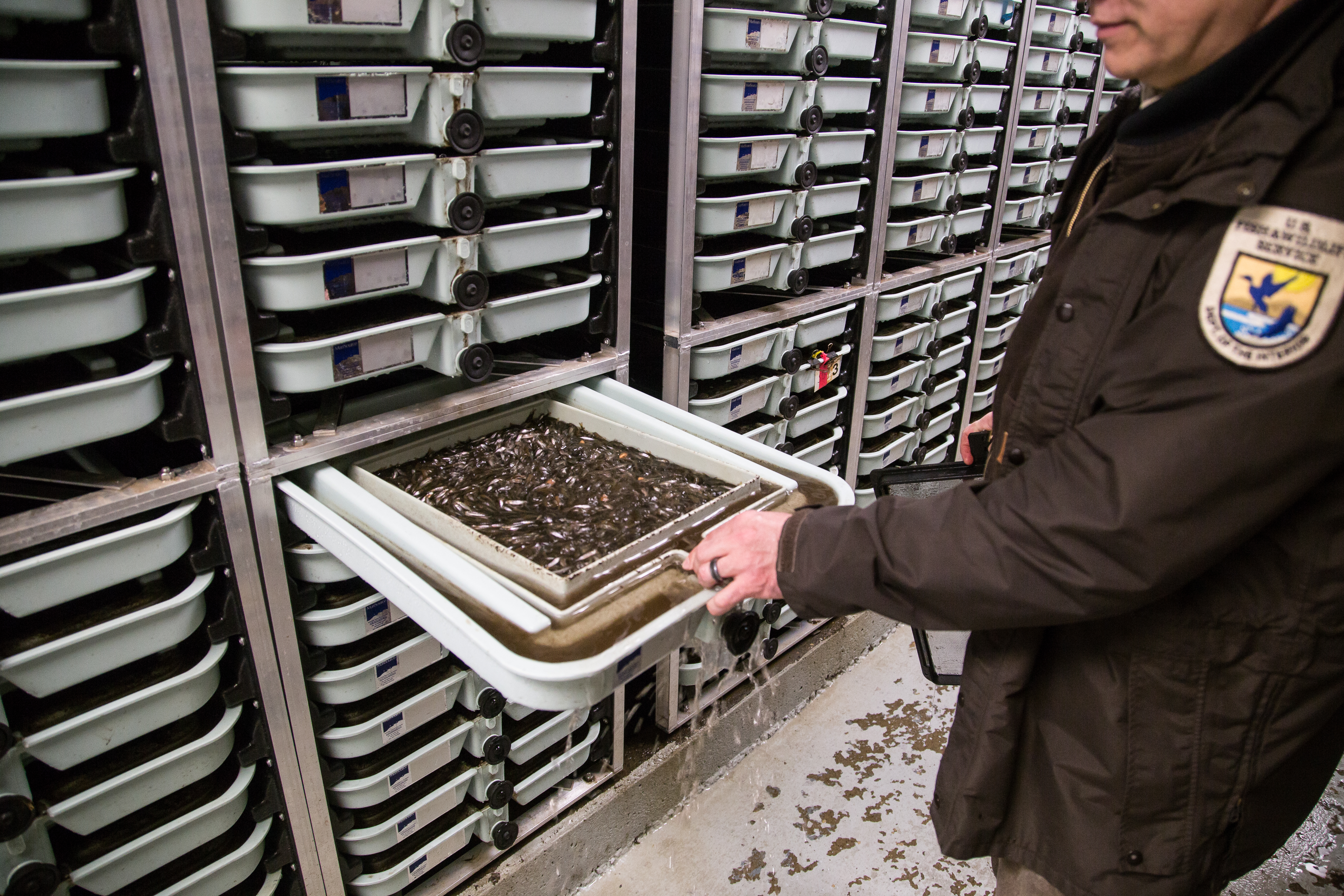
Little White Salmon National Fish Hatchery, Washington, one of many hatcheries operated to supplement wild salmon runs.

There are debates over the effectiveness of hatcheries. Proponents of the plan argue that hatcheries are essential to the survival of salmon within the Puget Sound region and beyond. Other groups argue against the hatcheries because they claim that it offsets the environmental balance by introducing the artificially raised salmon populations and pitting them against the natural population.

The earliest hatcheries incubated eggs and released small fry into streams to reduce the mortality of young salmon. Later hatcheries raised fish to fingerling size in crowded tanks before release. Historically, hatchery fish were fed a mixture of fish offal, horse meat, tripe, and condemned pork and beef, a diet that could promote disease and its spread among the closely held fish.

== Habitat ==
Salmon are anadromous fish that hatch in clean, cool freshwater streams with stable gravel beds, where they spawn and rear as juveniles. Their habitat requires adequate water flow and quality, complex stream features such as pools, riffles, woody debris, and a healthy riparian zone that provides shade, nutrients, and shelter. Estuaries and nearshore areas serve as critical transition zones where juvenile salmon adapt from freshwater to saltwater and find food and refuge before migrating to the ocean. Maintaining free-flowing, cool, and clean water with intact stream-side vegetation is essential for salmon survival and successful reproduction. The survival of wild salmon relies heavily on having suitable habitat for spawning and rearing their young. This habitat can be degraded by many factors, including land development, timber harvest, and resource extraction.

Pacific salmon use a variety of freshwater and marine habitats and during migrations cross multiple international borders which makes effective conservation strategies difficult to organize and implement. Native populations of these species are found in watersheds in Taiwan, China, Korea, Japan, Russia, Alaska, Yukon, British Columbia, Washington, Idaho, Oregon, and California, as well as in much of the North Pacific Ocean.

Because salmon depend on functioning habitat throughout their range, habitat restoration and monitoring are central to their conservation. Human activities—including dam construction, population growth, and land development—significantly affect the abundance and distribution of salmon runs around the Pacific Rim.

== Dam removal ==
After spawning, adult salmon die, and their carcasses deliver marine-derived nutrients to freshwater and riparian ecosystems. A 2000 Washington Department of Fish and Wildlife report identified more than 137 wildlife species with ecological relationships to salmon at some stage of their life cycle. This transfer of ocean-derived nutrients has also been documented in the ecological literature.

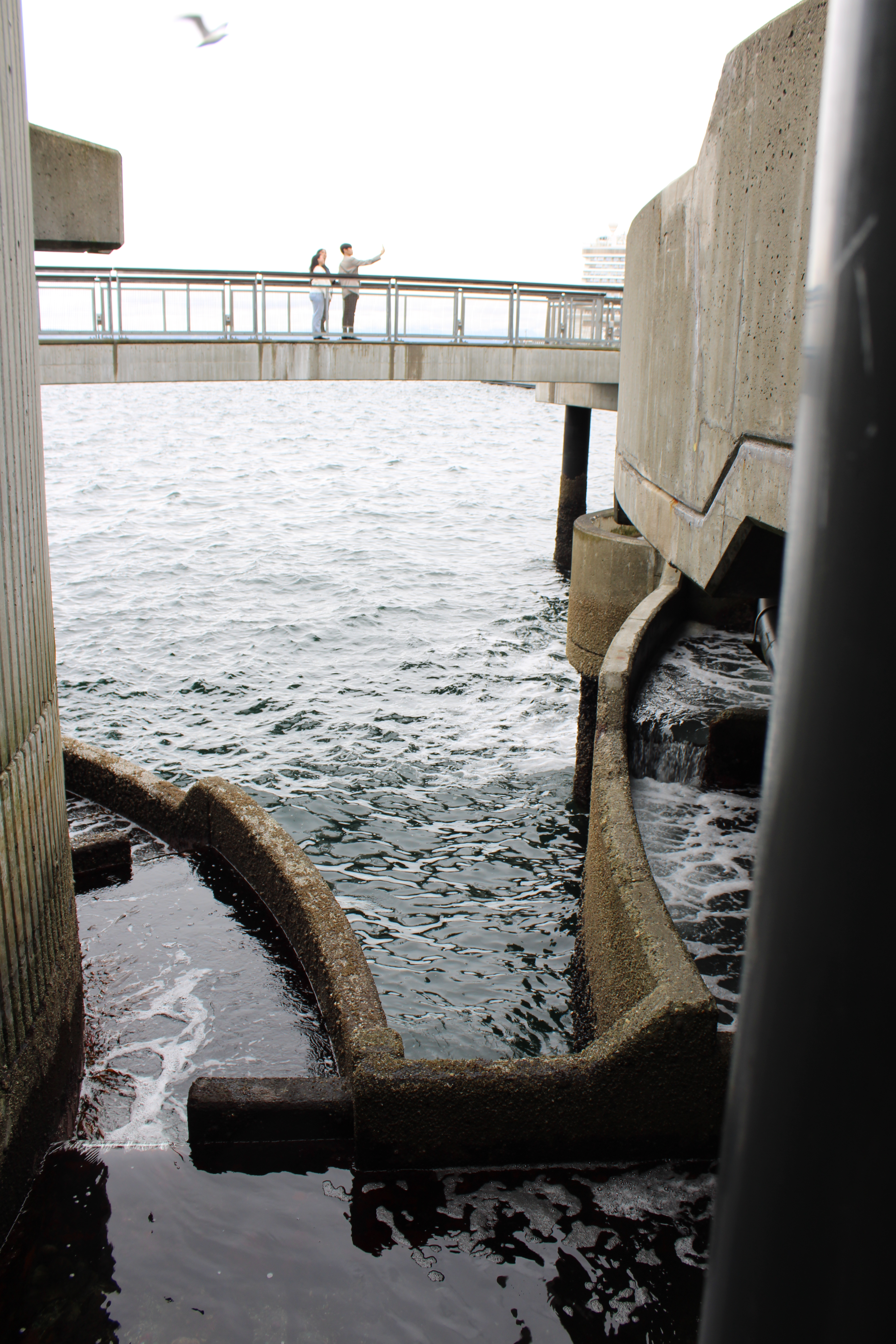
A fish ladder allows some salmon to pass a dam, but does not eliminate cumulative mortality from the migration.

Dams on the Snake and Columbia Rivers block salmon from reaching upstream spawning habitat and have contributed to the decline of the region's runs. Even where fish ladders are present, cumulative and delayed mortality associated with passage through the hydrosystem reduces the number of fish that complete their migration.

Removing or breaching dams has been proposed as a salmon-recovery measure. A 2022 review draft by NOAA Fisheries concluded that breaching the four lower Snake River dams is essential, in combination with other measures, to rebuilding Snake River salmon and steelhead. A 2022 report for the Washington governor's office and Senator Patty Murray assessed whether the dams' benefits could be replaced to support breaching, and a peer-reviewed review reached similar conclusions about the potential benefits.

In 2000, the Oregon Chapter of the American Fisheries Society—representing hundreds of fishery professionals—passed a resolution that "The four lower Snake River dams are a significant threat to the continued existence of remaining Snake River salmon and steelhead stocks; and if society wishes to restore these salmonids to sustainable, fishable levels, a significant portion of the lower Snake River must be returned to a free-flowing condition by breaching the four lower Snake River dams, and this action must happen soon".

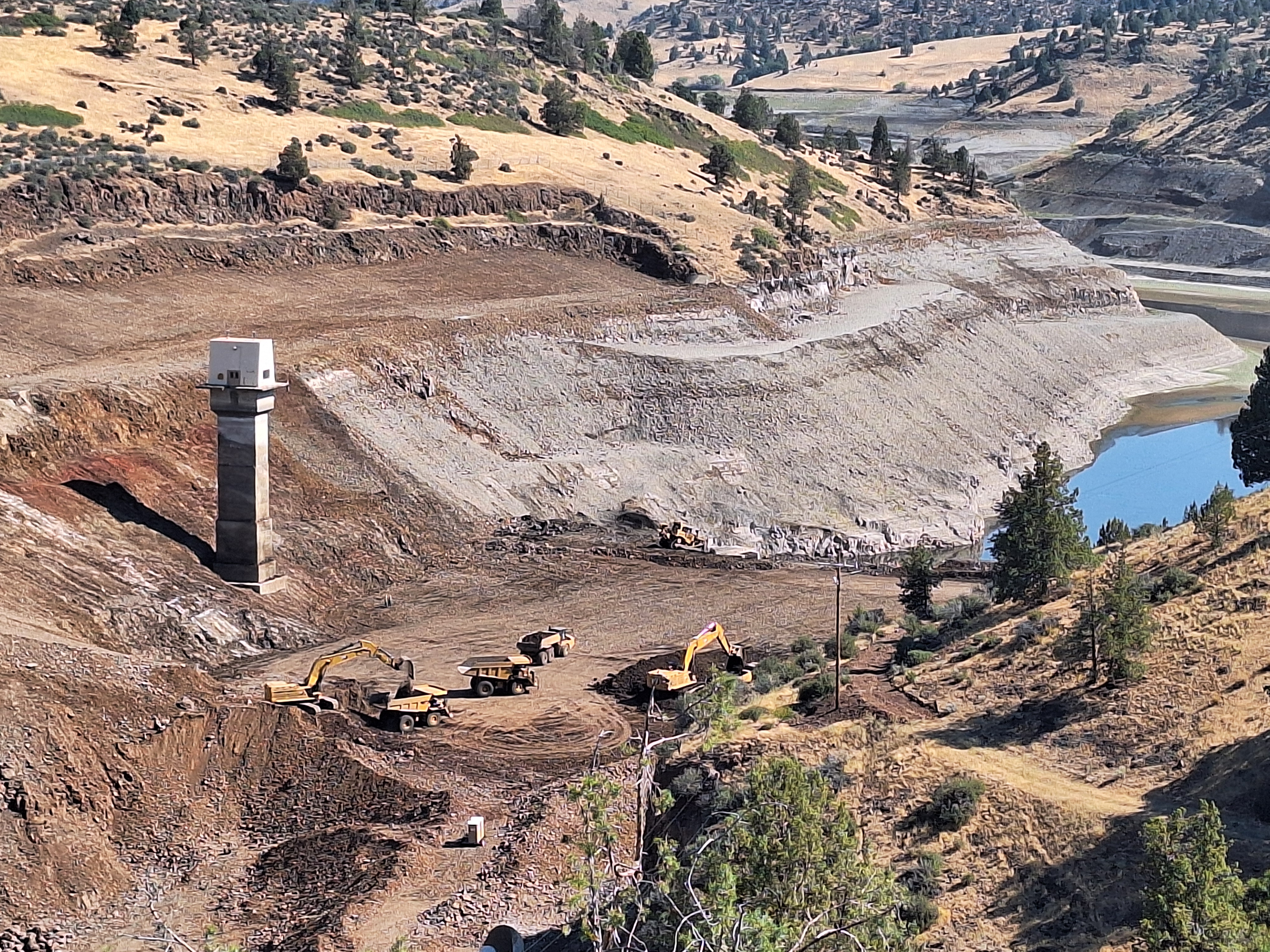
Removal of Iron Gate Dam on the Klamath River, part of a 2023–2024 project that reopened salmon habitat blocked for more than a century.

On the Klamath River, four hydroelectric dams were removed in 2023 and 2024 in what NOAA Fisheries called the largest dam-removal project in United States history, reopening about 420 miles (680 km) of salmon habitat. Within a year, salmon were documented spawning in the Klamath and its tributaries above the former dam sites for the first time in more than a century.

== Conservation versus restoration ==
In salmon management, conservation and restoration are related but distinct goals. Conservation emphasizes protecting and sustaining existing populations and their habitat, whereas restoration refers to actively returning degraded habitat or depleted runs toward a former condition. The Society for Ecological Restoration defines ecological restoration as "the process of assisting the recovery of an ecosystem that has been degraded, damaged, or destroyed."

Restoration is more complex and less consistently defined than conservation. In a review of river restoration in the United States, Margaret Palmer and colleagues found that "little agreement exists on what constitutes a successful river restoration effort", with billions of dollars spent on projects that lack agreed standards for ecological success. Because the outcomes of active restoration are often uncertain, restoration guidance for Pacific Northwest watersheds generally prioritizes protecting intact, high-quality habitat before attempting to rebuild degraded areas.

== Conservation organizations ==
There are many coalitions, councils, non-profits, and government-funded groups focused on conserving wild salmon. As Mindy Cameron wrote in a 2002 Seattle Times article, "billions of dollars have been spent to reverse declining salmon runs, with no guarantee of success. What's needed here is a new kind of public conversation about salmon and their place in our future."

== See also ==
- Golden State Salmon Association
- Nooksack Salmon Enhancement Association (NSEA)
- Salmon Watch
- Steelhead and salmon distinct population segments
- Wild Salmon Center
