= Columbia Plateau Aquifer System =

Series of aquifers in Washington, Oregon, and Idaho, US

The Columbia Plateau Aquifer system is a series of layered aquifers across ~44,000 mi^{2} of Washington, Oregon, and Idaho. The aquifer system is on the Columbia Plateau, contained within the Cascades, Rocky Mountains, Okanogan Highlands, and the Blue Mountains. These aquifers are bounded on the bottom by a layer of Miocene basaltic rock that can be up to 15,000 ft thick. The primary aquifers in the system are shallow, and unconfined.

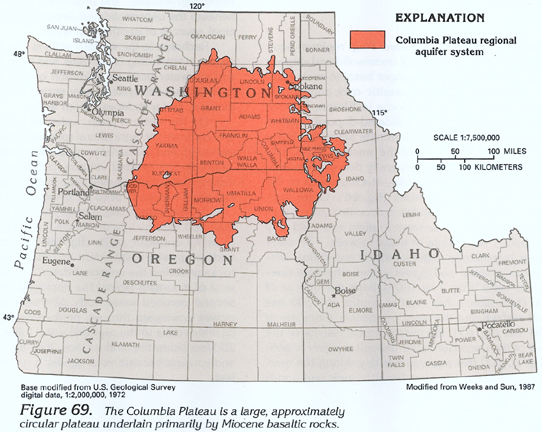
Map of the Columbia Plateau aquifer region (red)

== Water quality ==
The primary source of water quality concerns was from agricultural outputs, especially in the southwestern area of the system where land use is predominantly agricultural. As of a USGS study on water quality in 2010, one major concern was that nitrates present in the water were exceeding the 10 mg/L standard for drinking water in 17% of the sampled wells. An additional concern was that pesticides like atrazine were often present in the water, but so far they have been detected at concentrations meeting human health standards.

== Water quantity ==
The primary use of groundwater is for crop irrigation. Areas of the plateau with high surface irrigation have less concern over groundwater depletion due to reinfiltration of excess water into the aquifer system. Areas where groundwater depletion is a concern are in the Umatilla area, and the Palouse slope. In the Umatilla area, total decline since the 1970s is from 300 ft to 100 ft of water height. Overall, between 1968-2009, mean groundwater decline across the aquifer system was at 1.0 ft/year.
