= Nooksack Salmon Enhancement Association =

US non-profit organization

- Formation: 1990
- Purpose: Restoring sustainable wild salmon runs in Whatcom County
- Headquarters: Bellingham, Washington
- Executive Director: Rachel Vasak
- Parent organization: Washington State Regional Fisheries Enhancement Group Program
- Website: www.n-sea.org

Nooksack Salmon Enhancement Association (NSEA) was formed in 1990 as a non-profit organization with an overall goal of seeing an increase in returning natural spawning salmon to the over 1,600 km (990 mi) of rivers and streams in Whatcom County, Washington, in the United States. The association was formed as part of Washington State's Regional Fisheries Enhancement Groups Program established by the Washington State Legislature in 1990 to involve local communities, citizen volunteers, and landowners in the state's salmon recovery efforts. NSEA is one of 14 groups in Washington State each with the common goal of restoring salmonid populations and habitat within their region.

Whatcom County is home to the five species of Pacific salmon (chinook, chum, coho, pink, sockeye and kokanee, a lake resident sockeye), along with several other salmonids (bull trout, Dolly Varden, both sea-run and resident coastal cutthroat, and steelhead and rainbow trout) which rely heavily on the return of salmon each year.

The main focus of the NSEA is to restore lowland riparian areas. These areas are commonly impacted by human activities such as urban development, agriculture, and timber harvest. Riparian areas slow runoff, filter chemicals and excess nutrients caused by agriculture, shade the water, and slow the process of erosion to riverbanks. The NSEA deals with the issue of riparian destruction by leading many volunteer projects each year. The aim of these projects are to replant native trees and shrubs along stream banks, construct fences to keep livestock out, do an array of in-stream habitat improvement projects including adding large woody debris or gravel to streams, and stabilize eroding or undercut banks. Along with habitat restoration, the NSEA gives many free educational seminars to the local area, along with local schools, on how they can help with salmon management. The current executive director of NSEA is Rachel Vasak.

== See also ==
- Conservation biology
- Conservation movement
- Environmental protection
- Habitat conservation
- List of environmental organizations
- Sustainable development
