= Wild Salmon Center =

- Abbreviation: WSC
- Formation: 1992; 34 years ago
- Founder: Pete Soverel; Tom Pero
- Type: Nonprofit
- Tax ID no.: 94-3166095
- Legal status: 501(c)(3)
- Headquarters: Portland, Oregon
- Region served: Northern Pacific Rim
- Staff: 40
- Website: https://wildsalmoncenter.org/

The Wild Salmon Center (WSC) is an worldwide conservation network of scientists and advocates working to protect wild salmon, steelhead, char, trout and the ecosystems on which these species depend on. Headquartered in Portland, Oregon, WSC works with communities, businesses, governments, and other non-profits to protect and preserve healthy salmon ecosystems in the North Pacific. WSC programs range in location from Russia, Japan, Alaska, British Columbia, Washington State, Oregon, and California.

== History ==
WSC was founded as a non-profit by Pete Soverel and Tom Pero in 1992, and was run entirely by volunteers during its first five years. Originally, WSC received funding for research and conservation by organizing angling trips to the Kamchatka Peninsula in the Russian Far East. These expeditions were a joint venture between the WSC and Moscow State University.

In 1998, WSC hired Guido Rahr as executive director, who previously developed an approach to salmon conservation that focused on proactive protection of the strongest remaining populations (stronghold strategy).

The organization expanded between 1999 and 2010. A new organization called "The Conservation Angler" was created in 2003 to take over the ecotourism programs, allowing WSC to focus solely on science and conservation. One of the WSC programs, "State of the Salmon", in collaboration with Ecotrust, used data to track the health and trends of wild salmon populations. This data was then analyzed and used to inform salmon management and conservation throughout the Pacific Rim. While "State of the Salmon" has concluded, sustainable fisheries work continues with a new organization, Ocean Outcomes, which was incubated and launched by the Wild Salmon Center in 2015.

In July 2023, WSC was labeled as "undesirable" in Russia, due to harm to economic development.

== Stronghold Strategy ==
Adopted in 1999, the WSC has been focused on a proactive "salmon stronghold" conservation strategy as a regional and international approach to salmon conservation. Salmon strongholds refer to river ecosystems that contain the most abundant and biologically diverse populations of wild salmon. Select areas include: the Kamchatka Peninsula, the Russian Far East mainland, Sakhalin Island, British Columbia, Bristol Bay, Alaska, as well as key watersheds in the lower 48 U.S. States.

As part of its efforts to protect habitats in Oregon, the Wild Salmon Center is a member of the North Coast State Forest Coalition. In identifying and then protecting salmon strongholds, WSC aims to conserve healthy salmon stocks before population decline and ensure sustainability for the long term.

== See also ==
- Conservation biology
- Salmon Watch
