= Lake Kronotskoye =

Lake in Kamchatka, Russia

- Lake Kronotskoe
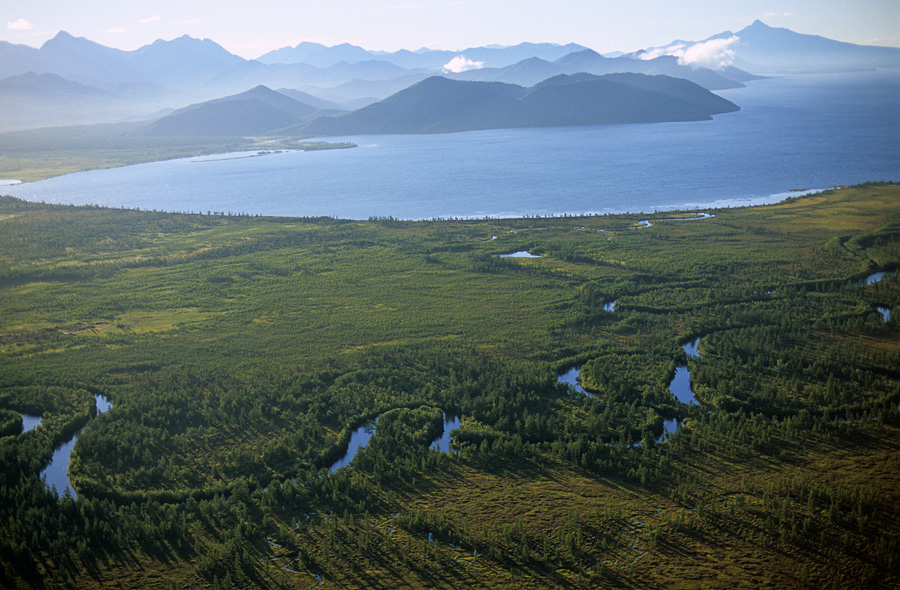
- Lake Kronotskoye

- Location in Kamchatka Krai, Russia
- Location: Kamchatka Krai, Russia
- Coordinates: 54.79°N 160.25°E
- Primary inflows: Listvennichnaya, Unana, Uzon Rivers
- Primary outflows: Kronotskaya River
- Catchment area: 2,330 km^{2} (900 sq mi)
- Surface area: 246 km^{2} (95 sq mi)
- Average depth: 58 m (190 ft)
- Max. depth: 136 m (446 ft)
- Water volume: 14.2 km^{3} (3.4 cu mi)
- Surface elevation: 372 m (1,220 ft)

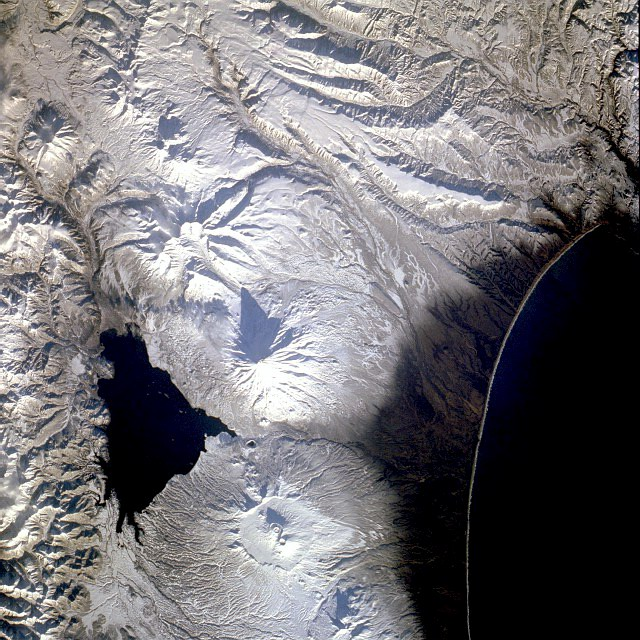
Aerial photograph of Lake Kronotskoye (left) in November 1985. The Kronotsky and Krasheninnikov volcanoes are visible between the lake and the Pacific coast to the right (southwest). North is at the upper left.

Lake Kronotskoye (Russian: Кроноцкое озеро) is a triangle-shaped lake located in Kamchatka Krai, Russia, 30 kilometres (19 mi) north of the Valley of Geysers and 40 kilometres (25 mi) away from the east coast of the Kamchatka Peninsula. It is named after the nearby volcano Kronotsky, part of the Eastern Range, whose name presumably derives from Itelmen krának, “high stone mountain”. It was formed about 10,000 years ago when lava and pyroclastic flows from eruptions of the Kronotsky and Krasheninnikov volcanoes dammed the Kronotskaya River.

Lake Kronotskoye covers an area of 246 square kilometres (95 sq mi) and has an average depth of 58 metres (190 ft) and a volume of 14.2 cubic kilometres (3.4 cu mi). The lake drains an area of 2,330 square kilometres (900 sq mi), with the Listvennichnaya, Unana, and Uzon being the largest rivers to flow into it. The lake drains into Kronotskaya River in its southeast corner, which flows 39 kilometres (24 mi) southeast into the Pacific Ocean.

Lake Kronotskoye freezes over from late December to mid-May to a depth of one meter. It is a dimictic lake, reaching isothermy in July and late November. The water is cold even in summer, not exceeding 16 °C (61 °F) even at its warmest in September. The pH at the surface decreases from 8.7 to 8.0 during the growing season.

The area surrounding the lake is uninhabited and protected as Kronotsky Nature Reserve, a component of the Volcanoes of Kamchatka World Heritage Site. The first Russians to reach the lake were the members of F.P. Ryabushinsky's Kamchatka expedition of 1908; the islands in the lake are named after them.

== Fauna ==
Massive rapids at the head of the Kronotskaya River prevent fish from entering or leaving the lake. Those that live in the lake are therefore of special scientific interest as model studies in microevolution processes. They comprise a population of landlocked sockeye or kokanee salmon, as well as Salvelinus kronocius and Salvelinus schmidti char species endemic to the lake distinguished by significant polymorphism and plasticity; researchers have identified between three and five different forms. There are 11 islands in the eastern side of the lake which cover a total area of around 0.5 square kilometres (0.19 sq mi) and host a colony of about 600 pairs of slaty-backed gulls. Lake Kronotskoye is also well known for its population of swans.
