= Grey woodpecker =

The grey woodpecker has been split into the following species:

- African grey woodpecker, Dendropicos goertae
- Eastern grey woodpecker, Dendropicos spodocephalus

Grey woodpeckers are found in North Africa
