= The Freshwater Trust =

American non-profit organization

The Freshwater Trust is a conservation non-profit based in Portland, Oregon. The mission of The Freshwater Trust is to preserve and restore freshwater ecosystems.

== History ==
The Freshwater Trust was a result of a merger between Oregon Trout and Oregon Water Trust in 2009. Oregon Trout was founded by a group of conservation fly fishermen in 1983. Founded 10 years later in 1993 with the help of Oregon Trout, Oregon Water Trust became the nation's first water trust.

In 1991, the organization led a coalition to list several Pacific salmon under the Endangered Species Act. In 1996, they created Salmon Watch, a program to introduce students to the importance of protecting wild fish. In 1998, they led the effort to designate lottery dollars to habitat restoration.

In 2007, they began building the StreamBank web platform, an effort to use technology to increase the pace and scale of restoration. They received a patent for StreamBank in 2011, and two years later, they received the U.S. Water Prize for innovation.

In 2015, Joe Whitworth, the organization's president, wrote a book documenting the "quantified conservation" approach that The Freshwater Trust uses to fix rivers. "Quantified: Redefining Conservation for the Next Economy" was published by Island Press.

== Overview ==
The Freshwater Trust returns degraded streams to healthy conditions. Restoration actions include planting streamside, or riparian, forests to provide shade to a stream and stabilize banks; placing large woody structures instream to provide habitat for spawning and rearing habitat; restoring flow to dewatered streams; and reconnecting streams to closed floodplains. The Freshwater Trust also works with regulated entities to meet regulatory compliance through river restoration.

The Freshwater Trust touts an approach called "quantified conservation." This is the idea that conservation actions must be linked to positive, quantifiable outcomes for the environment.

The organization also uses water quality trading to fix rivers. Water quality trading is a collaborative solution to address water quality and pollutant loads in a watershed. Water quality trading allows permitted point-source dischargers to invest in “green” rather than “gray” infrastructure (natural versus built) solutions. The Freshwater Trust assists a point source with designing and implementing trading program and bringing in regulators and non-point sources. The U.S. Water Alliance awarded The Freshwater Trust the 2013 U.S. Water Prize for its work in this field.

The Freshwater Trust, along with Willamette Partnership, was instrumental in bringing together stakeholders in the Pacific Northwest to shape consistent approaches to trading in the region. Trading programs can help achieve water quality goals in a way that is consistent with the Clean Water Act, is based in sound science, and provides sufficient accountability that water quality benefits are being delivered.

== Projects ==
The Freshwater Trust works throughout basins in the Pacific Northwest. Below is a list of some completed and ongoing projects by The Freshwater Trust.

- Sandy River basin
- Hood River basin
- John Day River basin
- Snake River basin
- Rogue River basin
- MacKenzie River basin
