= National Wildlife =

US magazine

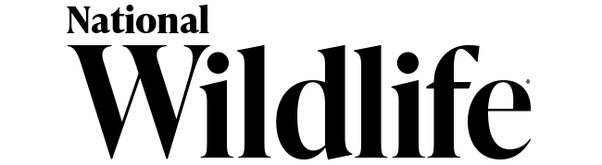

- Editor-in-chief: Lisa Moore
- Categories: Nature Magazine
- Frequency: Quarterly
- Founded: 1962; 64 years ago
- Company: National Wildlife Federation
- Country: United States
- Based in: Reston, Virginia
- Language: English
- Website: nwf.org
- ISSN: 0028-0402

National Wildlife is an American magazine published quarterly by the National Wildlife Federation (NWF), a nonprofit conservation group. In publication since 1962, and with an emphasis on wildlife conservation and natural history, it is designed to inform NWF’s Associate Members and other readers about key issues relating to the nation's natural resources and environment.

== History and profile ==
The magazine features photography, stories and articles on nature and wildlife. The magazine also reports on new discoveries about wildlife and wild animal behavior, how to garden naturally using native plants and how to attract birds, butterflies and other wildlife to backyards and gardens.

In November 2014 Lisa Moore was appointed editor-in-chief of National Wildlife. She replaced Mark Wexler in the post.

Information, advice and tips are also provided on the National Wildlife Magazine website on wildlife gardening, birding, wildlife photography, wildlife/animals and outdoor family activities.

The magazine has won many awards for its wildlife photography including Pictures of the Year International awards in 2004 and 2005.

== Annual Photography Contest ==
National Wildlife magazine also offers an annual Photography Contest and has done so for 40 years. Winners from the Photo Contest are published in the Magazine and on the Magazine website.
