= Kronotsky =

Stratovolcano in Kamchatka, Russia

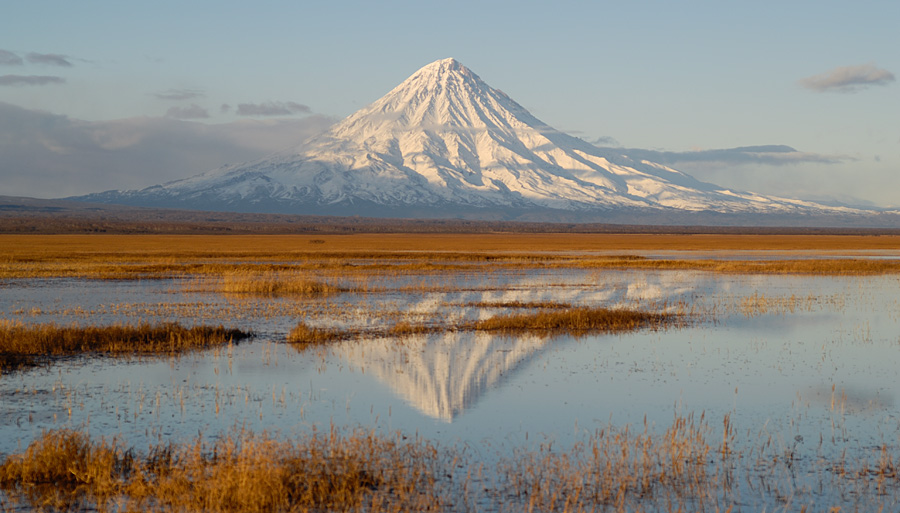
- Kronotsky

Highest point
- Elevation: 3,482 m (11,424 ft)
- Prominence: 2,736 m (8,976 ft)
- Listing: Ultra, Ribu
- Coordinates: 54°45′12″N 160°31′36″E

Geography
- Location within Kamchatka Krai Location within Russia
- Location: Kamchatka, Russia
- Parent range: Eastern Range

Geology
- Mountain type: Stratovolcano
- Last eruption: 4 October 2025

Climbing
- Easiest route: basic rock/snow climb

Kronotsky (Russian: Кроноцкая сопка, Kronotskaya Sopka) is a major stratovolcano on the Kamchatka Peninsula, Russia. It is located in Kronotsky Nature Reserve to the east of Lake Kronotskoye (the largest freshwater lake in Kamchatka). It has a particularly symmetrical conical shape, comparable to Mount Fuji in Japan and to Mount Mayon in the Philippines. The summit crater is plugged by a volcanic neck, and the summit itself is ice-capped. It exhibits the classic radial drainage pattern, extending downward from its crater. Kronotsky is considered to be one of the most scenic volcanoes in Kamchatka. In the 20th century, the volcano had low activity, with occasional weak phreatic eruptions. Its latest eruption started on October 4, 2025, with an ash cloud up to 9 km (5.6 mi) high.

== See also ==
- Kronotsky Nature Reserve
- List of ultras of Northeast Asia
- List of volcanoes in Russia
