= Bryansky Les Nature Reserve =

Nature reserve in Bryansk Oblast, Russia

Bryansk Forest Nature Reserve
- Russian: Брянский лес
- IUCN category Ia (strict nature reserve)
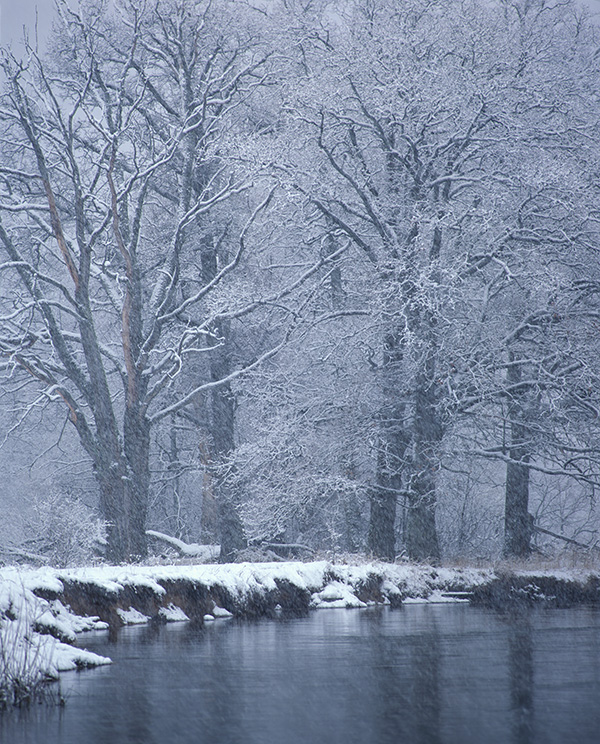
- Bryansk Forest Zapovednik

- Location within Russia
- Location: Bryansk Oblast, Russia
- Nearest city: Bryansk
- Coordinates: 52°30′N 34°00′E
- Area: 121.86 km^{2} (47.05 sq mi)

The Bryansk Forest Nature Reserve, also known as Bryansky Les (Russian: Брянский лес), is a nature reserve in Bryansk Oblast, Russia, along the Nerussa River (a tributary of the Desna River) near the Russian border with Ukraine.

The forest is a nature reserve (zapovednik), and is an integral part of the Nerussa-Desna Woodland UNESCO-MAB Biosphere Reserve, important for protecting the "diversity and integrity of the broadleaf forest in European Russia". It is one of the last remaining unbroken forests on the southern end of the European broadleaf forest, supporting abundant wildlife in the forests and bogs. The reserve covers an area of 12,186 ha (47.05 sq mi).

== Topography ==
The Bryansk Nature Reserve is part of the Nerusso-Desna woodland, a UNESCO-MAB Biosphere Reserve. This biosphere has been established on the bases of a well-developed network of protected areas, which are connected ecologically. The Bryansk Forest is located in the basin of the middle reaches of the Desna river, a left tributary of the Dnieper River on the border of Ukraine). The terrain is flat: the minimum height above sea level - 134.5 m (at the level of the Nerussa River; the maximum is 189.4 m. The dry land is dominated by sandy and loamy soils; in flood plains, meadows and alluvial lowlands there are bog soils. The Bryansk forests have diminished in size over time, and were once considered dense.

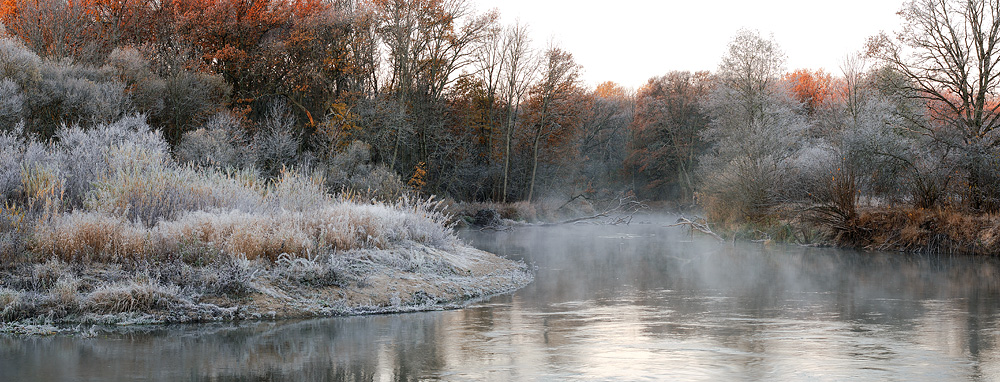
Bryansk Forest

Across the Ukrainian border is the Ukraine's Desnyansko-Starogutsky National Park, which has a forested section that has similar habitat similar to Bransksy's.

== Ecoregion and Climate ==
Bryansky Les is located in the Central European mixed forests ecoregion, a temperate hardwood forest covering much of northeastern Europe, from Germany to Russia.

The climate of Bryansky Les is Humid continental climate, warm summer (Köppen climate classification (Dfb)). This climate is characterized by large swings in temperature, both diurnally and seasonally, with mild summers and cold, snowy winters. Average annual precipitation is 550 millimetres (22 in).

== Plants and animals ==
The vegetation in the reserve features widespread pine and pine-oak forests on poor, sandy soils. Zonal spruce and deciduous broad-leaved forests are rare. The forest contrasts with the surrounding agricultural landscape. The reserve has a buffer zone of 9,654 hectares (23,860 acres). In the areas adjacent to the reserve there is an established network of state reserves and natural monuments of regional importance, the protection and administration of which is carried out jointly with the reserve land users. This includes the state nature reserve of federal importance "Kletnyanskoy", with an area of 39,100 hectares (97,000 acres).

The animals in the reserve are typical of the southern range of the mixed boreal-forest subdomain of the Palaearctic region: grouse, boreal owl, hare, lynx, brown bear, and others. Bison were brought to the reserve in 2011.

The Bryansk forest is the only place in Europe where there are all ten of the European woodpeckers: great spotted woodpecker, middle spotted, lesser spotted woodpecker, Syrian, white-backed, black woodpecker, grey, green, three-toed and Wryneck.

== See also ==
- List of Russian Nature Reserves (class 1a 'zapovedniks')
