= Kronotsky Nature Reserve =

Strict nature reserve in Kamchatka Krai, Russia

- IUCN category Ia (strict nature reserve)
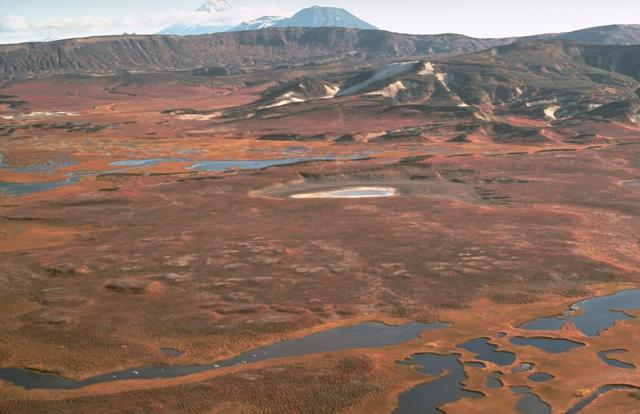
- Uzon caldera

- Location within Russia
- Location: Kamchatka
- Nearest city: Petropavlovsk-Kamchatsky (230 km SW)
- Coordinates: 54°55′31″N 160°32′25″E
- Area: 11,421 km^{2} (4,410 sq mi)
- Established: 1882 / 1934

Kronotsky (Кроноцкий) Nature Reserve (also: Kronotsky Biosphere Zapovednik) is a Russian zapovednik (strict nature reserve) reserved for the study of natural sciences in the remote Russian Far East, on the coast of the Kamchatka Peninsula. It was created in 1934 and its current boundary contains an area of 10,990 km^{2} (4,240 sq mi). The largest lake in the reserve is Lake Kronotskoye, which covers an area of 246 square kilometres (95 sq mi). It also has Russia's only geyser basin, plus several mountain ranges with numerous volcanoes, both active and extinct. Due to its often-harsh climate and its mix of volcanoes and geysers, it is frequently described as the Land of Fire and Ice.

Kronotsky is mainly accessible only to scientists, plus approximately 3,000 tourists annually who pay a fee equivalent to US$700 to travel by helicopter for a single day's visit. It is part of Volcanoes of Kamchatka, a UNESCO World Heritage Site.

== Ecoregion and climate ==
Kronotsky is in the Kamchatka-Kurile meadows and sparse forests ecoregion, which covers the coastal zones of Kamchatka and surrounding islands. The climate is Humid continental climate, cool summer (Köppen climate classification Dwb). This climate is characterized by high variation in temperature, both daily and seasonally, with dry winters and cool summers.

== Flora and fauna ==
Over 750 plant species grow in the reserve, which has volcanoes rising up to a height of over 3,510 m (11,500 feet).

The nature reserve boasts over 800 brown bears, some of the largest in the world, that can grow to over 540 kg (1,190 lb). The 800-plus population makes it Eurasia's largest protected brown bear population. Bears in the Kronotsky reserve often encounter each other at salmon streams in the park, where they can socialize freely with each other.

Some bears have been observed to sniff the kerosene and gasoline off of discarded fuel barrels that the reserve uses to power generators and helicopters, apparently having formed an addiction. After inhaling for a few minutes, they dig a shallow hole in which to lie down. Bears have been seen waiting for helicopters to take off so that they can sniff any fuel that may have been dropped onto the ground.

== Valley of Geysers ==
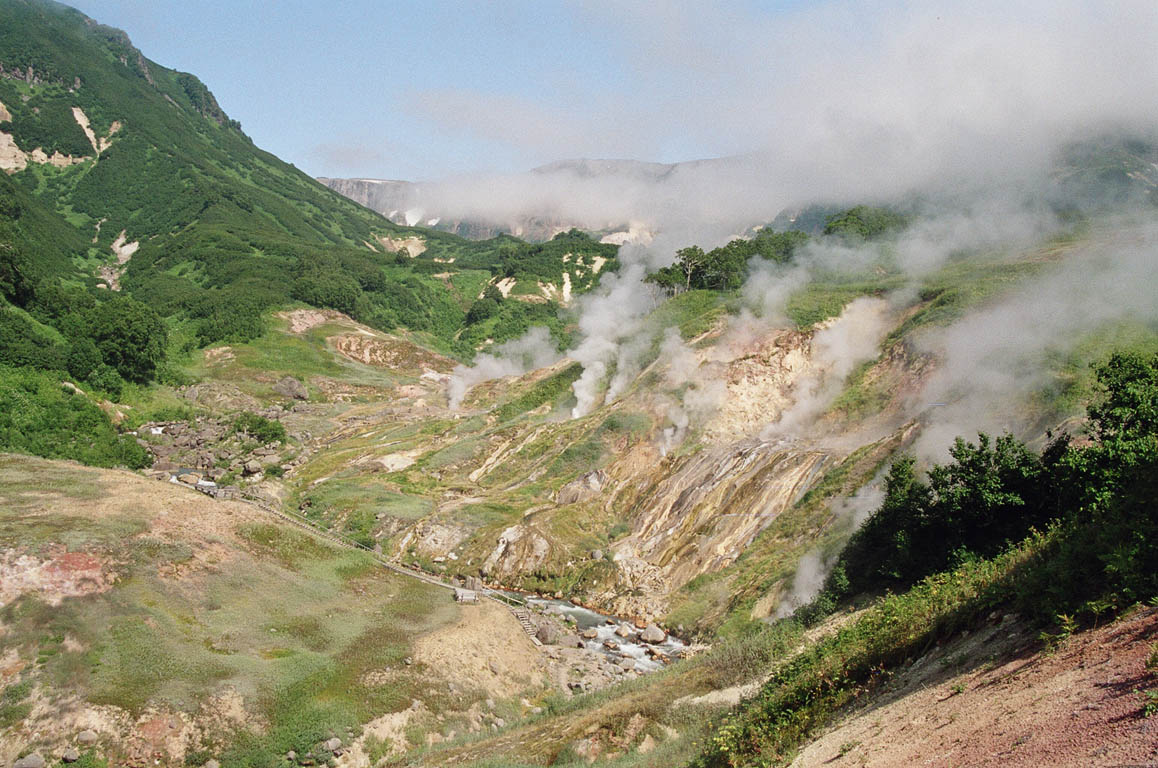
Valley of Geysers

The Valley of Geysers (Russian: Долина гейзеров) and the Mutnovsky geyser field are the only geyser fields in Eurasia; the Valley of Geysers is the second-largest concentration of geysers in the world. The 6-km-long basin with approximately ninety geysers and many hot springs is situated on the Kamchatka Peninsula in the Russian Far East, predominantly on the left bank of the ever-deepening Geysernaya River.

Within the valley, a volcanic cone collapsed approximately 40,000 years ago, forming the Uzon Caldera, which continues to steam in places where magma can heat groundwater to a near-boil. The area is less than 13 km (8.1 mi) wide and holds at least 500 geothermal hot springs, mud pots, and other similar features.

Among the geysers is the Velikan (giant) Geyser, which erupts with tons of water that shoots more than 25 meters into the air during a minute-long eruption approximately every six hours. At least 20 such geysers erupt on a stretch of the Geysernaya River Basin in the Valley of Geysers, along with dozens of smaller gushing vents and hundreds of hot springs. The largest of these geysers erupts with 60 tons of water once or twice a year.

== Kronotsky's “Cleansing Case” ==
Today's territory of the reserve has had the status of farmland for many years; in the 1960s and 1970s, it was home to settlements and military units, oil exploration was underway, and a hydroelectric power plant was being designed. In 2015, the reserve was the first in Russia to be included in a pilot program to eliminate damage from economic activities. The state has allocated funding of 454 million rubles to the project. From February 2015 to August 2016, Alexander Ilyin was Deputy Director for Protected Areas. During his tenure, Vitaly Drozd's company “Ecologiya” received the contract to clean up the reserve's territory. In 2016, Tikhon Shpilenok, a hereditary conservationist and son of Igor Shpilenok, head of the Bryansk Forest Reserve and renowned wildlife photographer, died of cancer at the age of 36. Tikhon Shpilenok found out about his diagnosis in April 2015; he had to leave the reserve for treatment and was absent from his workplace for almost all of 2016. In March 2017, Tikhon's place as director of the reserve was taken by his brother Pyotr Shpilenok. In 2018, Vitaly Drozd became a defendant in a fraud case and in 2020 for embezzlement. As part of his cooperation with the investigation, he claimed that Tikhon Shpilenok and his colleagues had embezzled the money issued for the clean-up. Thanks to the deal with the investigation, Drozd received a suspended sentence instead of 10 years in prison. On the basis of Drozd and Ilyin's testimony, the Investigative Committee of Kamchatka initiated a criminal case against four employees of the reserve: Director of Science and Tourism Roman Korchigin, Head of the Scientific Department Darya Panicheva, Deputy Director for Financial Support Oksana Terekhova, and Deputy General Affairs Officer Nikolai Pozdnyakov.

According to investigators, an organized criminal group from the management of the Kronotsky Nature Reserve stole 460 million rubles allocated by the state to clean it up and buried the scrap metal right on the reserve's territory. The prosecution requested six years in prison for Roman Korchigin, seven years for Daria Panicheva, eight years for Oksana Terekhova and four and a half years for Nikolai Pozdnyakov.

Defenders of the reserve's employees point to massive inconsistencies in the prosecution materials: for example, Roman Korchigin's evidence of guilt is based on episodes from 2015, when he was not yet working in the reserve. In addition, the investigation has not conducted a single confrontation, and has refused to conduct an expert evaluation of the documents and an examination of the work that has been done. The places on the territory of the nature reserve where the rubbish was allegedly buried were also not named. The fact that 243 kilometers of the park's shoreline were cleared of litter, removing more than 1,300 tonnes of solid waste and over 5,000 barrels of fuel and lubricants, was documented by a vast array of photos and videos, numerous reports broadcast on federal channels, many of them with the involvement of regional officials. The court, however, refused to take all these documents into account. The court also refused to attach to the case a 2021 report by MSU scientists in which they documented the re-vegetation of the cleared areas. One of the witnesses for the prosecution, I. S. Koval, confirmed that some of the signatures in the protocols on his behalf had been forged, which had been confirmed by forensic tests.

Kamchatka governor Vladimir Solodov spoke in support of the defendants. Their defense was also voiced by Vsevolod Stepanitsky, Distinguished Ecologist of the Russian Federation, Minister of Natural Resources and Environment of Kamchatka Krai Alexei Kumarkov, head of “RussiaDiscovery” Vadim Mamontov, and many others. On 30 June 2022, director Peter Shpilenok tendered his resignation in protest against unfair harassment of his colleagues. Shpilenok is sure that the lobby of supporters of industrial salmon farming on Kronotsky Lake is behind the accusation. The project to build an artificial fish passage between the lake and the Pacific Ocean is owned by Gleb Frank's Russian Fisheries Company, son-in-law of businessman Gennady Timchenko. Daria Panicheva, as head of the scientific department of the nature reserve, was responsible for preparing the scientific case against the project. Notably, even the main witness for the prosecution, Vitaly Drozd, said in court that he did not understand “what the reserve staff were doing here”, while Alexander Ilyin said that “clean-up work was carried out with the involvement of machinery, with the involvement of vessels, transport”.

Only when the guilty verdict had already been handed down, at the beginning of December 2022, the Ministry of Natural Resources ordered an expert assessment of the state of nature in the reserve. The expertise showed that there were no rubbish dumps on the territory of the reserve, but there was visible evidence of work to move the waste to removal points. This completely refutes the main accusation of the investigation that budget money was embezzled and scrap metal was simply buried. In early September 2022, over 60 representatives of environmental organisations wrote an open letter to Russian President Vladimir Putin, asking him to take personal control of the case against Kronotsky employees and to instruct the Prosecutor General’s Office and the Investigative Committee to re-examine the case and conduct independent investigations.

Staff shortages due to the criminal case have led to the suspension of research and excursion activities in the Kronotsky Nature Reserve and the South Kamchatka Federal Wildlife Refuge.

On 7 February 2023, the Kamchatka Regional Court annulled the conviction and released the defendants from custody; the case was sent back to the trial court for reconsideration. Defense lawyer Irina Diachenko and former Kronotsky director Peter Shpilenok called this an important step towards restoring justice.

== See also ==
- Evgeny Chernikin
- Kronotsky
