= European Association for Biometrics =

Dutch non-profit organization

European Association for Biometrics , EAB
- Founded: 17 Nov 2011
- Type: Research, education, training
- Purpose: Biometrics
- Location: Bussum
- Region served: European Union and external international
- Key people: Jean Salomon (COO)
- Website: eab.org

The European Association for Biometrics (EAB) is a non-profit organization in the field of biometrics with its headquarters in Bussum (Netherlands). The Association promotes the development of biometrics and its use in Europe, in general in accordance with the law, with the principles of ethics, stimulating the development of technology, increasing security and business.

== Aims ==
The purpose of the activity is to promote the development of proper and meaningful use of biometrics from the point of view of interest of the inhabitants of European, industrial, academic, organizational and educational backgrounds.

== History ==
The association was founded on November 17, 2011, in Darmstadt at the Fraunhofer Institute for Computer Graphics Research. It was developed as part of the Biometric European Stakeholders Network (BEST Network) project, funded by the European Commission under the 7th Framework Program for the Scientific Conference. The EAB Statute was based on the CAST, e.V. There were 14 institutions from 10 different European countries involved in the activities of the foundation. The interests of the members are represented by the Board.

== Organization ==
The EAB includes institutions, companies and individuals from all over Europe. In general, the EAB has more than 200 members. The association is an active network with local people in contact in most European countries. The wave cluster solidifies the structure, which represents the composition on the outside. The EAB Advisory Board, composed of senior members of the community, advises on the development of strategic issues.

In special interest groups, committees and working groups dealing with various topics, members have the opportunity to discuss current issues. The results are summarized in the documents presenting the position or in white papers and made available to the public for further discussion.

== Activities ==
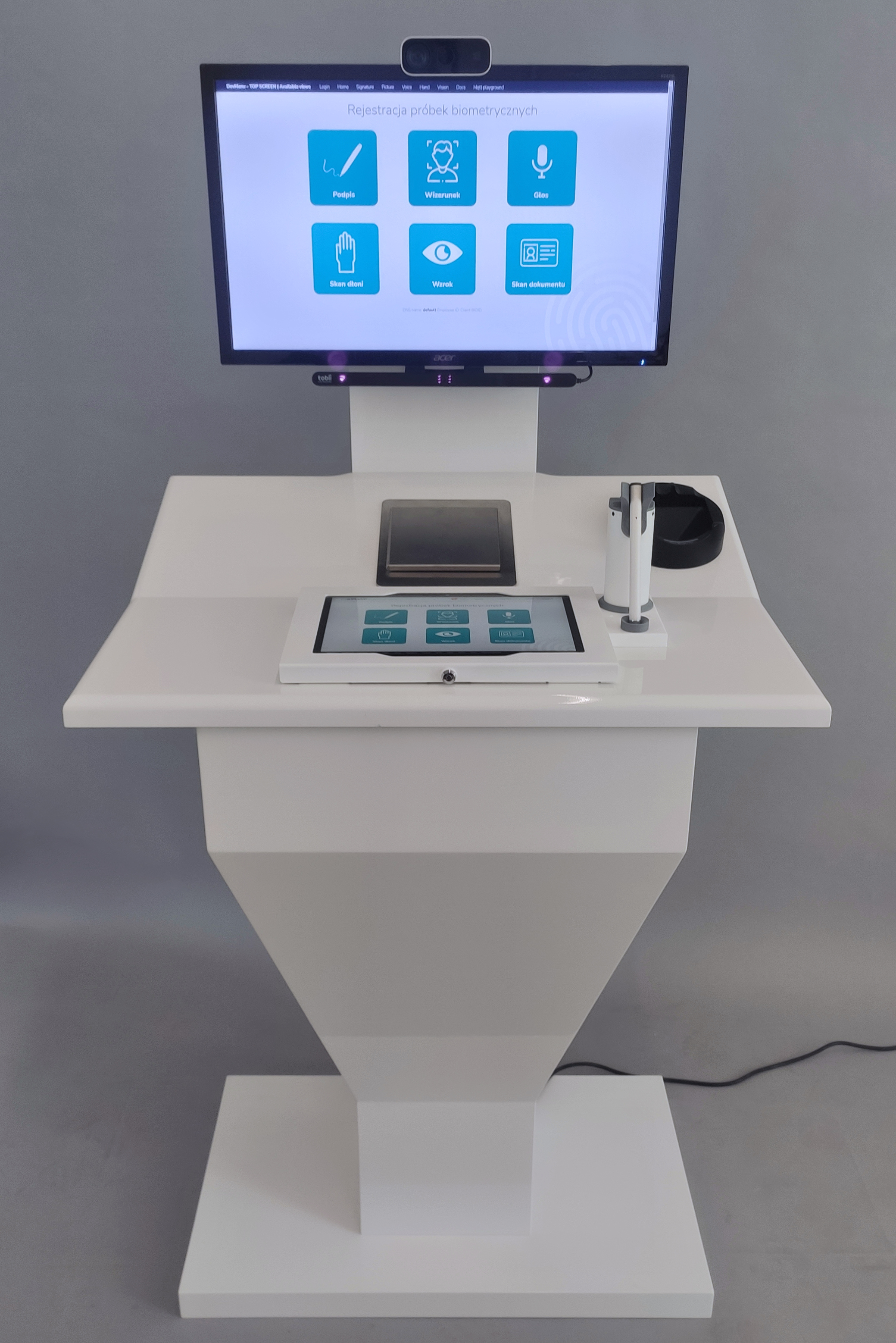
Biometric Island examining facial image 2D and 3D, voice timbre, and verifying handwritten signature

EAB organizes several conferences, seminars and workshops. For example, the European Research Projects Conference (EAB-RPC) organized the project, which presented two projects funded by the European Commission within the framework of its current policy framework. Also, trends and opportunities of biometrics in banking are discussed

In order to promote young scientists, the award funds a research award and a branch award. Outstanding doctoral theses are presented and awarded by a selected jury. EAB is active in many parts of the world, promoting innovation and developing a competitive biometrics market in Europe. The EAB is responsible for regulating the increasing interoperability of data and standards for data formatting, in compliance with ISO standards.

Together with international organizations and the authorities of European countries, the EAB is a coalition partner in promoting the establishment of the International Identity Day celebrated annually on 16 September.

The European Association for Biometrics (EAB) is hosting its European Biometric Max Snijder, Research, and Industry Awards since 2007. These awards are granted annually to individuals who have been judged by a panel of internationally respected experts to be making a significant contribution to the field of biometrics research in Europe.

== See also ==
- Access control
- AFIS
- BioAPI
- Biometrics
- Biometrics in schools
- Fingerprint recognition
- Fuzzy extractor
- Gait analysis
- Government database
- Handwritten biometric recognition
- Identity Cards Act 2006
- Keystroke dynamics
- Multiple Biometric Grand Challenge
- Private biometrics
- Retinal scan
- Signature recognition
- Smart city
- Speaker recognition
- Vein matching
- Voice analysis
