= Soft biometrics =

Soft biometrics traits are physical, behavioural or adhered human characteristics, classifiable in pre–defined human compliant categories. These categories are, unlike in the classical biometric case, established and time–proven by humans with the aim of differentiating individuals. In other words the soft biometric traits instances are created in a natural way, used by humans to distinguish their peers.

== Introduction ==
The beginnings of Soft Biometrics can be identified as laid by Alphonse Bertillon in the 19th century. He first proposed a personal identification system based on biometric, morphological and anthropometric determinations. The most common traits he introduced were colour of eye, hair, beard and skin; shape and size of the head; body characteristics like height or weight as well as indelible marks such as birth marks, scars or tattoos. A majority of these descriptors presently fall into the category of Soft Biometrics.

Jain lately redefined Soft Biometrics as a set of traits providing information about an individual, though these are not able to individually authenticate the subject because they lack distinctiveness and permanence. Further research has shown that a larger set of soft biometric traits can be used to identify individuals. A redefinition of Soft Biometrics was proposed by Reid and Nixon as any characteristic which can be naturally described by humans. Such soft biometrics are well suited to deployment in surveillance applications and research is ongoing to capitalise on these developments.

== Soft Biometric traits ==
Traits which accept the above definition include, but are not limited to:

- Physical: skin colour, eye colour, hair colour, presence of beard or moustache, height, weight, gender, race, ethnicity, wrinkles.
- Behavioural: gait, keystroke, signature.
- Adhered human characteristics: clothes colour, tattoos, accessories.

Soft Biometrics inherit a main part of the advantages of Biometrics and furthermore endorses by its own assets. Some of the advantages include non obtrusiveness, the computational, and time efficiency and human compliance. Furthermore, they do not require enrollment, nor the consent or the cooperation of the observed subject.

== Usage ==
Soft biometrics are used to identify humans and can be combined with biometric authentication systems to increase the amount of accuracy of recognition. An example is visual surveillance, and soft biometric information can help identify people during the inconsistencies when faces are captured poorly on camera.

== See also ==
- Biometrics
- Private biometrics
- Surveillance
- Anthropometry
- Biometric passport
- Biometrics in schools
