= Beau Parry =

American inventor

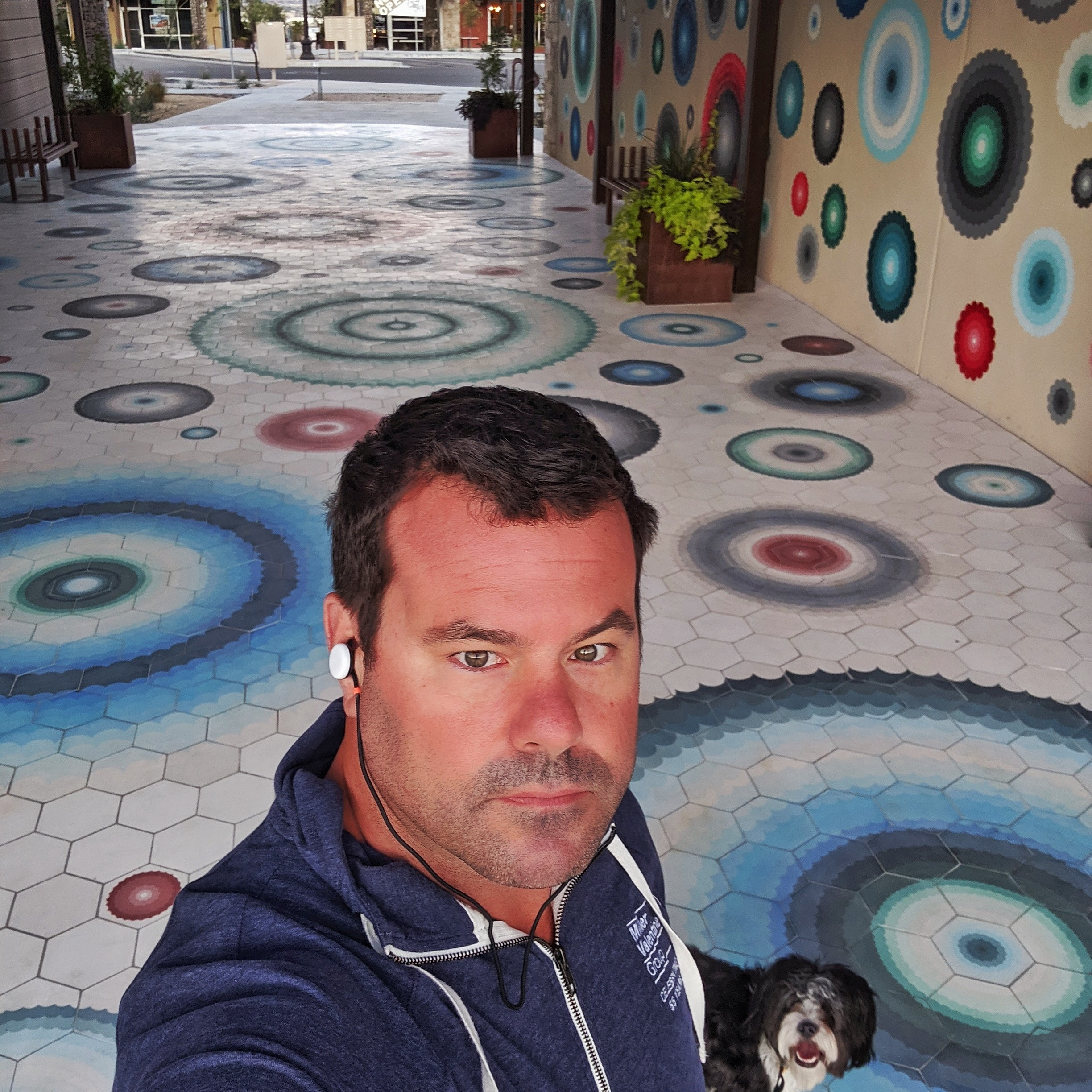
Beau Parry

Beau Parry is an American inventor, known for his contributions in the field of biometric encryption and liveness detection. He is also the founder of BRIVAS, a biometric technology company that offers biometric encryption services for consumers, enterprises, and government. In 2012, Parry founded BRIVAS in downtown Cincinnati, Ohio. In 2015 he received a U.S. patent for biometric encryption to stop digital identity fraud. Parry achieved a granted patent that claims cloud based biometric liveness detection wherein the verification enables access to data stored in a blockchain. Parry also holds a patent that protects deterministic bio-signature keybinding that utilizes one or more biometrics along with contextual data from GPS or other sensors. Parry delivered a talk "Seeing is Believing" in a TEDx event in October 2018. Parry was educated at Cincinnati Country Day School and later attended The University of North Carolina at Chapel Hill where he studied Economics and played linebacker under Coach Mack Brown.

In December 2023, BRIVAS partnered with Dan Leckrone (formerly The TPL Group) to create BRIVAS II, LLC, a biometric patent portfolio for commercialization.
