= Fuzzy extractor =

Fuzzy extractors are a method that allows biometric data to be used as inputs to standard cryptographic techniques, to enhance computer security. "Fuzzy," in this context, refers to the fact that the fixed values required for cryptography will be extracted from values close to but not identical to the original key, without compromising the security required. One application is to encrypt and authenticate users records, using the biometric inputs of the user as a key.

Fuzzy extractors are a biometric tool that allows for user authentication, using a biometric template constructed from the user's biometric data as the key, by extracting a uniform and random string $R$ from an input $w$, with a tolerance for noise. If the input changes to $w'$ but is still close to $w$, the same string $R$ will be re-constructed. To achieve this, during the initial computation of $R$ the process also outputs a helper string $P$ which will be stored to recover $R$ later and can be made public without compromising the security of $R$. The security of the process is also ensured when an adversary modifies $P$. Once the fixed string $R$ has been calculated, it can be used, for example, for key agreement between a user and a server based only on a biometric input.

== History ==
One precursor to fuzzy extractors was the so-called "Fuzzy Commitment", as designed by Juels and Wattenberg. Here, the cryptographic key is decommitted using biometric data.

Later, Juels and Sudan came up with Fuzzy vault schemes. These are order invariant for the fuzzy commitment scheme and use a Reed–Solomon error correction code. The code word is inserted as the coefficients of a polynomial, and this polynomial is then evaluated with respect to various properties of the biometric data.

Both Fuzzy Commitment and Fuzzy Vaults were precursors to Fuzzy Extractors.

== Motivation ==
In order for fuzzy extractors to generate strong keys from biometric and other noisy data, cryptography paradigms will be applied to this biometric data. These paradigms:

(1) Limit the number of assumptions about the content of the biometric data (this data comes from a variety of sources; so, in order to avoid exploitation by an adversary, it's best to assume the input is unpredictable).

(2) Apply usual cryptographic techniques to the input. (Fuzzy extractors convert biometric data into secret, uniformly random, and reliably reproducible random strings.)

These techniques can also have other broader applications for other type of noisy inputs such as approximative data from human memory, images used as passwords, and keys from quantum channels. Fuzzy extractors also have applications in the proof of impossibility of the strong notions of privacy with regard to statistical databases.

== Basic definitions ==
=== Predictability ===
Predictability indicates the probability that an adversary can guess a secret key. Mathematically speaking, the predictability of a random variable $A$ is $\max_{\mathrm{a}}P[A = a]$.

For example, given a pair of random variable $A$ and $B$, if the adversary knows $b$ of $B$, then the predictability of $A$ will be $\max_{\mathrm{a}}P[A = a | B = b]$. So, an adversary can predict $A$ with $E_{b \leftarrow B}[\max_{\mathrm{a}} P[A = a | B = b]]$. We use the average over $B$ as it is not under adversary control, but since knowing $b$ makes the prediction of $A$ adversarial, we take the worst case over $A$.

=== Min-entropy ===
Min-entropy indicates the worst-case entropy. Mathematically speaking, it is defined as $H_\infty(A) = - \log(\max_{\mathrm{a}}P[A = a])$ .

A random variable with a min-entropy at least of $m$ is called a $m$-source.

=== Statistical distance ===
Statistical distance is a measure of distinguishability. Mathematically speaking, it is expressed for two probability distributions $A$ and $B$ as $SD[A,B]$ = $\frac{1}{2}\sum_{\mathrm{v}} | P[A = v] - P[B = v] |$. In any system, if $A$ is replaced by $B$, it will behave as the original system with a probability at least of $1 - SD[A,B]$.

=== Definition 1 (strong extractor) ===
Setting $M$ as a strong randomness extractor. The randomized function Ext: $M \rightarrow \{0,1\}^l$, with randomness of length $r$, is a $(m,l,\epsilon)$ strong extractor for all $m$-sources $W$ on $M (\operatorname{Ext}(W;I), I) \approx_\epsilon (U_l, U_r),$ where $I = U_r$ is independent of $W$.

The output of the extractor is a key generated from $w \leftarrow W$ with the seed $i \leftarrow I$. It behaves independently of other parts of the system, with the probability of $1 - \epsilon$. Strong extractors can extract at most $l = m - 2 \log \frac {1} {\epsilon} + O(1)$ bits from an arbitrary $m$-source.

=== Secure sketch ===
Secure sketch makes it possible to reconstruct noisy input; so that, if the input is $w$ and the sketch is $s$, given $s$ and a value $w'$close to $w$, $w$ can be recovered. But the sketch $s$ must not reveal information about $w$, in order to keep it secure.

If $\mathbb{M}$ is a metric space, a secure sketch recovers the point $w \in \mathbb{M}$ from any point $w' \in \mathbb{M}$ close to $w$, without disclosing $w$ itself.

=== Definition 2 (secure sketch) ===
An $(m,\tilde{m},t)$ secure sketch is a pair of efficient randomized procedures (SS – Sketch; Rec – Recover) such that:

(1) The sketching procedure SS takes as input $w \in \mathbb{M}$ and returns a string $s \in {\{0,1\}^*}$.

The recovery procedure Rec takes as input the two elements $w' \in \mathbb{M}$ and $s \in {\{0,1\}^*}$.

(2) Correctness: If $dis(w,w') \leq t$ then $Rec(w',SS(w)) = w$.

(3) Security: For any $m$-source over $M$, the min-entropy of $W$, given $s$, is high:

For any $(W,E)$, if $\tilde{H}_{\mathrm{\infty}}(W|E) \geq m$, then $\tilde{H}_{\mathrm{\infty}}(W|SS(W),E) \geq \tilde{m}$.

=== Fuzzy extractor ===
Fuzzy extractors do not recover the original input but generate a string $R$ (which is close to uniform) from $w$ and allow its subsequent reproduction (using helper string $P$) given any $w'$ close to $w$. Strong extractors are a special case of fuzzy extractors when $t$ = 0 and $P = I$.

=== Definition 3 (fuzzy extractor) ===
An $(m,l, t, \epsilon)$ fuzzy extractor is a pair of efficient randomized procedures (Gen – Generate and Rep – Reproduce) such that:

(1) Gen, given $w \in \mathbb{M}$, outputs an extracted string $R \in {\mathbb\{0,1\}^l}$ and a helper string $P \in {\mathbb\{0,1\}^*}$.

(2) Correctness: If $dis(w,w') \leq t$ and $(R,P) \leftarrow Gen(w)$, then $Rep(w',P) = R$.

(3) Security: For all m-sources $W$ over $M$, the string $R$ is nearly uniform, even given $P$. So, when $\tilde{H}_{\mathrm{\infty}}(W|E) \geq m$, then $(R,P,E) \approx ( U_{\mathrm{l}}, P, E)$.

So Fuzzy extractors output almost uniform random sequences of bits which are a prerequisite for using cryptographic applications (as secret keys). Since the output bits are slightly non-uniform, there's a risk of a decreased security; but the distance from a uniform distribution is no more than $\epsilon$. As long as this distance is sufficiently small, the security will remain adequate.

=== Secure sketches and fuzzy extractors ===
Secure sketches can be used to construct fuzzy extractors: for example, applying SS to $w$ to obtain $s$, and strong extractor Ext, with randomness $x$, to $w$, to get $R$. $(s,x)$ can be stored as helper string $P$. $R$ can be reproduced by $w'$ and $P = (s,x)$. $Rec (w',s)$ can recover $w$ and $Ext(w,x)$ can reproduce $R$.

The following lemma formalizes this.

=== Lemma 1 (fuzzy extractors from sketches) ===
Assume (SS,Rec) is an $(M,m,\tilde{m},t)$ secure sketch and let Ext be an average-case $(n,\tilde{m},l,\epsilon)$ strong extractor. Then the following (Gen, Rep) is an $(M,m,l,t,\epsilon)$ fuzzy extractor:

(1) Gen $(w,r,x)$: set $P = (SS(w;r),x),R = Ext(w;x),$ and output $(R,P)$.

(2) Rep $(w',(s,x))$: recover $w = Rec(w',s)$ and output $R = Ext(w;x)$.

Proof:

from the definition of secure sketch (Definition 2), $H_\infty(W | SS(W)) \geq \tilde{m}$;

and since Ext is an average-case $(n,m,l, \epsilon)$-strong extractor;

$$SD (( Ext(W;X),SS(W),X),(U_l,SS(W),X)) = SD((R,P),(U_l,P)) \leq \epsilon.$$

=== Corollary 1 ===
If (SS,Rec) is an $(M,m,\tilde{m},t)$ secure sketch and Ext is an $(n,\tilde{m}-log(\frac {1} {\delta}),l,\epsilon)$ strong extractor,
then the above construction (Gen, Rep) is a $(M,m,l,t,\epsilon + \delta)$ fuzzy extractor.

The cited paper includes many generic combinatorial bounds on secure sketches and fuzzy extractors.

== Basic constructions ==
Due to their error-tolerant properties, secure sketches can be treated, analyzed, and constructed like a $(n,k,d)_{\mathcal{F}}$ general error-correcting code or $[n,k,d]_{\mathcal{F}}$ for linear codes, where $n$ is the length of codewords, $k$ is the length of the message to be coded, $d$ is the distance between codewords, and $\mathcal{F}$ is the alphabet. If $\mathcal{F}^n$ is the universe of possible words then it may be possible to find an error correcting code $C \subset \mathcal{F}^n$ such that there exists a unique codeword $c \in C$ for every $w \in \mathcal{F}^n$ with a Hamming distance of $dis_{Ham}(c,w) \leq (d-1)/2$. The first step in constructing a secure sketch is determining the type of errors that will likely occur and then choosing a distance to measure.

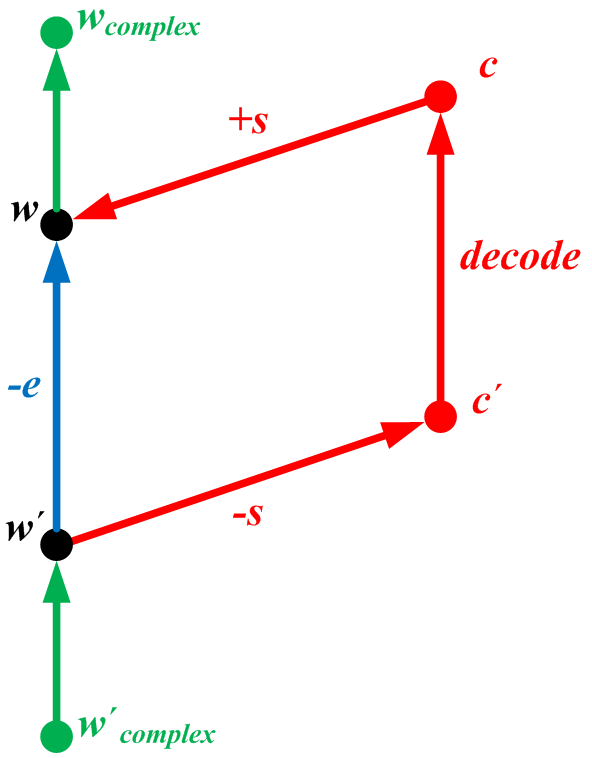
Red is the code-offset construction, blue is the syndrome construction, and green represents edit distance and other complex constructions.

=== Hamming distance constructions ===
When there is no risk of data being deleted and only of its being corrupted, then the best measurement to use for error correction is the Hamming distance. There are two common constructions for correcting Hamming errors, depending on whether the code is linear or not. Both constructions start with an error-correcting code that has a distance of $2t+1$ where ${t}$ is the number of tolerated errors.

==== Code-offset construction ====
When using a $(n,k,2t+1)_{\mathcal{F}}$ general code, assign a uniformly random codeword $c \in C$ to each $w$, then let $SS(w)=s=w-c$ which is the shift needed to change $c$ into $w$. To fix errors in $w'$, subtract $s$ from $w'$, then correct the errors in the resulting incorrect codeword to get $c$, and finally add $s$ to $c$ to get $w$. This means $Rec(w',s)=s+dec(w'-s)=w$. This construction can achieve the best possible tradeoff between error tolerance and entropy loss when $\mathcal{F} \geq n$ and a Reed–Solomon code is used, resulting in an entropy loss of $2t\log(\mathcal{F})$. The only way to improve upon this result would be to find a code better than Reed–Solomon.

==== Syndrome construction ====
When using a $[n,k,2t+1]_{\mathcal{F}}$ linear code, let the $SS(w)=s$ be the syndrome of $w$. To correct $w'$, find a vector $e$ such that $syn(e)=syn(w')-s$; then $w=w'-e$.

=== Set difference constructions ===
When working with a very large alphabet or very long strings resulting in a very large universe $\mathcal{U}$, it may be more efficient to treat $w$ and $w'$ as sets and look at set differences to correct errors. To work with a large set $w$ it is useful to look at its characteristic vector $x_w$, which is a binary vector of length $n$ that has a value of 1 when an element $a \in \mathcal{U}$ and $a \in w$, or 0 when $a \notin w$. The best way to decrease the size of a secure sketch when $n$ is large is to make $k$ large, since the size is determined by $n-k$. A good code on which to base this construction is a $[n,n-t\alpha,2t+1]_{2}$ BCH code, where $n=2^{\alpha}-1$ and $t \ll n$, so that $k \leq n-log{n \choose{t}}$. It is useful that BCH codes can be decoded in sub-linear time.

==== Pin sketch construction ====
Let $SS(w)=s=syn(x_w)$. To correct $w'$, first find $SS(w')=s'=syn(x_w')$, then find a set v where $syn(x_v)=s'-s$, and finally compute the symmetric difference, to get $Rec(w',s)=w' \triangle v=w$. While this is not the only construction that can be used to set the difference, it is the easiest one.

=== Edit distance constructions ===
When data can be corrupted or deleted, the best measurement to use is edit distance. To make a construction based on edit distance, the easiest way is to start with a construction for set difference or hamming distance as an intermediate correction step, and then build the edit distance construction around that.

=== Other distance measure constructions ===
There are many other types of errors and distances that can be used to model other situations. Most of these other possible constructions are built upon simpler constructions, such as edit-distance constructions.

== Improving error tolerance via relaxed notions of correctness ==
It can be shown that the error tolerance of a secure sketch can be improved by applying a probabilistic method to error correction with a high probability of success. This allows potential code words to exceed the Plotkin bound, which has a limit of $n/4$ error corrections, and to approach Shannon's bound, which allows for nearly $n/2$ corrections. To achieve this enhanced error correction, a less restrictive error distribution model must be used.

=== Random errors ===
For this most restrictive model, use a BSC$_{p}$ to create a $w'$ with a probability $p$ at each position in $w'$ that the bit received is wrong. This model can show that entropy loss is limited to $nH(p)-o(n)$, where $H$ is the binary entropy function.If min-entropy $m \geq n(H(\frac{1}{2} - \gamma)) + \varepsilon$ then $n(\frac{1}{2} - \gamma)$ errors can be tolerated, for some constant $\gamma > 0$.

=== Input-dependent errors ===
For this model, errors do not have a known distribution and can be from an adversary, the only constraints being $dis_\text{err} \leq t$ and that a corrupted word depends only on the input $w$ and not on the secure sketch. It can be shown for this error model that there will never be more than $t$ errors, since this model can account for all complex noise processes, meaning that Shannon's bound can be reached; to do this a random permutation is prepended to the secure sketch that will reduce entropy loss.

=== Computationally bounded errors ===
This model differs from the input-dependent model by having errors that depend on both the input $w$ and the secure sketch, and an adversary is limited to polynomial-time algorithms for introducing errors. Since algorithms that can run in better-than-polynomial-time are not currently feasible in the real world, then a positive result using this error model would guarantee that any errors can be fixed. This is the least restrictive model, where the only known way to approach Shannon's bound is to use list-decodable codes, although this may not always be useful in practice, since returning a list, instead of a single code word, may not always be acceptable.

== Privacy guarantees ==
In general, a secure system attempts to leak as little information as possible to an adversary. In the case of biometrics, if information about the biometric reading is leaked, the adversary may be able to learn personal information about a user. For example, an adversary notices that there is a certain pattern in the helper strings that implies the ethnicity of the user. We can consider this additional information a function $f(W)$. If an adversary were to learn a helper string, it must be ensured that, from this data he can not infer any data about the person from whom the biometric reading was taken.

=== Correlation between helper string and biometric input ===
Ideally the helper string $P$ would reveal no information about the biometric input $w$. This is only possible when every subsequent biometric reading $w'$ is identical to the original $w$. In this case, there is actually no need for the helper string; so, it is easy to generate a string that is in no way correlated to $w$.

Since it is desirable to accept biometric input $w'$ similar to $w$, the helper string $P$ must be somehow correlated. The more different $w$ and $w'$ are allowed to be, the more correlation there will be between $P$ and $w$; the more correlated they are, the more information $P$ reveals about $w$. We can consider this information to be a function $f(W)$. The best possible solution is to make sure an adversary can't learn anything useful from the helper string.

=== Gen(W) as a probabilistic map ===
A probabilistic map $Y()$ hides the results of functions with a small amount of leakage $\epsilon$. The leakage is the difference in probability two adversaries have of guessing some function, when one knows the probabilistic map and one does not. Formally:

$$| \Pr[A_1(Y(W)) = f(W)] - \Pr[A_2() = f(W)] | \leq \epsilon$$

If the function $\operatorname{Gen}(W)$ is a probabilistic map, then even if an adversary knows both the helper string $P$ and the secret string $R$, they are only negligibly more likely figure something out about the subject that if they knew nothing. The string $R$ is supposed to be kept secret; so, even if it is leaked (which should be very unlikely)m the adversary can still figure out nothing useful about the subject, as long as $\epsilon$ is small. We can consider $f(W)$ to be any correlation between the biometric input and some physical characteristic of the person. Setting $Y = \operatorname{Gen}(W) = R, P$ in the above equation changes it to:

$$|\Pr[A_1(R, P) = f(W)] - \Pr[A_2() = f(W)]| \leq \epsilon$$

This means that if one adversary $A_1$ has $(R,P)$ and a second adversary $A_2$ knows nothing, their best guesses at $f(W)$ are only $\epsilon$ apart.

=== Uniform fuzzy extractors ===
Uniform fuzzy extractors are a special case of fuzzy extractors, where the output $(R,P)$ of $Gen(W)$ is negligibly different from strings picked from the uniform distribution, i.e. $(R, P) \approx_\epsilon (U_\ell, U_{|P|})$.

=== Uniform secure sketches ===
Since secure sketches imply fuzzy extractors, constructing a uniform secure sketch allows for the easy construction of a uniform fuzzy extractor. In a uniform secure sketch, the sketch procedure $SS(w)$ is a randomness extractor $Ext(w;i)$, where $w$ is the biometric input and $i$ is the random seed. Since randomness extractors output a string that appears to be from a uniform distribution, they hide all information about their input.

=== Applications ===
Extractor sketches can be used to construct $(m, t, \epsilon)$-fuzzy perfectly one-way hash functions. When used as a hash function the input $w$ is the object you want to hash. The $P, R$ that $Gen(w)$ outputs is the hash value. If one wanted to verify that a $w'$ within $t$ from the original $w$, they would verify that $Rep(w', P) = R$. Such fuzzy perfectly one-way hash functions are special hash functions where they accept any input with at most $t$ errors, compared to traditional hash functions which only accept when the input matches the original exactly. Traditional cryptographic hash functions attempt to guarantee that is it is computationally infeasible to find two different inputs that hash to the same value. Fuzzy perfectly one-way hash functions make an analogous claim. They make it computationally infeasible two find two inputs that are more than $t$ Hamming distance apart and hash to the same value.

== Protection against active attacks ==
An active attack could be one where an adversary can modify the helper string $P$. If an adversary is able to change $P$ to another string that is also acceptable to the reproduce function $Rep(W, P)$, it causes $Rep(W, P)$ to output an incorrect secret string $\tilde{R}$. Robust fuzzy extractors solve this problem by allowing the reproduce function to fail, if a modified helper string is provided as input.

=== Robust fuzzy extractors ===
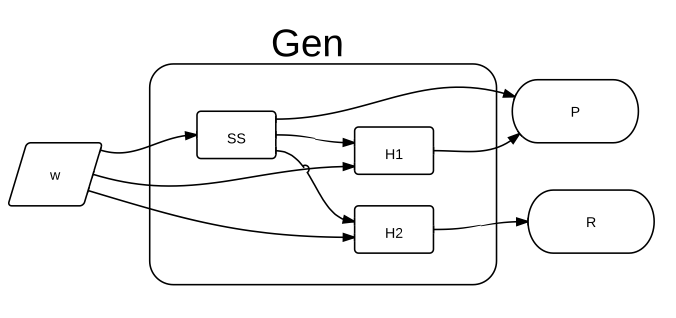

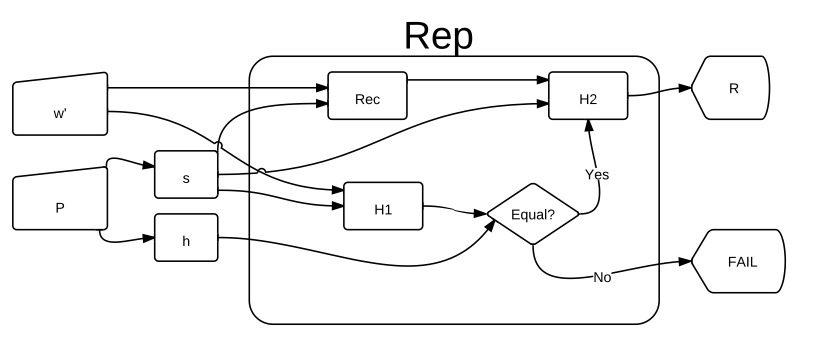

One method of constructing robust fuzzy extractors is to use hash functions. This construction requires two hash functions $H_1$ and $H_2$. The $Gen(W)$ function produces the helper string $P$ by appending the output of a secure sketch $s = SS(w)$ to the hash of both the reading $w$ and secure sketch $s$. It generates the secret string $R$ by applying the second hash function to $w$ and $s$. Formally:

$Gen(w): s = SS(w), return: P = (s, H_1(w,s)), R = H_2(w,s)$

The reproduce function $Rep(W, P)$ also makes use of the hash functions $H_1$ and $H_2$. In addition to verifying that the biometric input is similar enough to the one recovered using the $Rec(W,S)$ function, it also verifies that the hash in the second part of $P$ was actually derived from $w$ and $s$. If both of those conditions are met, it returns $R$, which is itself the second hash function applied to $w$ and $s$. Formally:

$Rep(w',\tilde{P}):$ Get $\tilde{s}$ and $\tilde{h}$ from $\tilde{P}; \tilde{w} = Rec(w',\tilde{s}).$ If $\Delta(\tilde{w}, w') \leq t$ and $\tilde{h} = H_1(\tilde{w},\tilde{s})$ then $return: H_2(\tilde{w}, \tilde{s})$ else $return: fail$

If $P$ has been tampered with, it will be obvious, because $Rep$ will fail on output with very high probability. To cause the algorithm to accept a different $P$, an adversary would have to find a $\tilde{w}$ such that $H_1(w, s) = H_1(\tilde{w},\tilde{s})$. Since hash function are believed to be one-way functions, it is computationally infeasible to find such a $\tilde{w}$. Seeing $P$ would provide an adversary with no useful information. Since, again, hash function are one-way functions, it is computationally infeasible for an adversary to reverse the hash function and figure out $w$. Part of $P$ is the secure sketch, but by definition the sketch reveals negligible information about its input. Similarly seeing $R$ (even though it should never see it) would provide an adversary with no useful information, as an adversary wouldn't be able to reverse the hash function and see the biometric input.
