= Biometrics in schools =

Some schools use biometric data such as fingerprints and facial recognition to identify students. This may be for daily transactions in the library or canteen or for monitoring absenteeism and behavior control. In 2002, Privacy International raised concerns that tens of thousands of UK school children were being fingerprinted by schools, often without the knowledge or consent of their parents. The supplier, Micro Librarian Systems, which uses technology similar to that used in prisons and the military, estimated that 350 schools throughout Britain were using such systems. In 2007, it was estimated that 3,500 schools are using such systems. Some schools in Belgium and the US have followed suit. Concerns have been raised by a number of groups, who suggest the harms far outweigh any putative benefits.

== Definition ==
Biometrics are unique physical or behavioral characteristics which can be used to automatically identify individuals. Biometric technologies capture, process and measure these characteristics electronically and compare them against existing records to create a highly accurate identity management capability.

== Types of biometrics used in schools ==
Fingerprint recognition technology in the biometric market has held the largest market size worldwide and has been widely adopted by many industries including schools. Fingerprint recognition is the most pervasive, old, simple, and cheap form of biometric technology. Although palm vein recognition, iris recognition and face recognition have been implemented in schools, finger scanning is by far the most commonly used technology in the U.S. education market.

In the UK, primarily the type of biometric employed is a fingerprint scan or thumbprint scan, but vein and iris scanning systems are also in use.

== United Kingdom ==
Biometrics have been used in the UK since the early first decade of the 21st century. Biometric technology is used to address truancy, to replace library cards, or to charge for meals. School biometrics, typically electronic fingerprinting systems, have raised privacy concerns because of the creation of databases that would progressively include the entire population. The UK introduced legal duties on schools if they wish to use biometric information about pupils, in the Protection of Freedoms Act 2012.

Schools use pupils' biometric data for cashless catering, libraries, payment systems, registration and locker systems. In the UK biometric technology in schools was initially used for library book issue, approved for use by the UK's Information Commissioner's Office in 2001 and the Department for Education in 2002. Within a few years biometrics were being used for cashless catering systems, enabling relatives to deposit money into pupils' catering accounts, to be debited by a child's biometric fingerprint scan at the point of sale. In the USA biometrics systems are used for catering primarily, as mentioned above, with library and registration biometrics in use as well. Fingerprint locking systems are also used in the United Kingdom (fingerprint lock in the Holland Park School in London,) databases, etc., in Belgium (Marie-José school in Liège), in France, in Italy, etc.

When children use systems in which their biometric fingerprints are processed in school no image of the fingerprint is stored, although the fingerprint data stored can be potentially used in the same way as an image of a fingerprint. A series of digits (some 30) is created so the computer can recognise a child when he/she places their fingerprint on a scanner. The data stored can be interoperable with Automated Fingerprint Identification Systems (AFIS) used by police and other agencies to store fingerprint data.

It is claimed to be impossible to reconstruct a finger print from biometric readers, although research in 2007 was undertaken and the paper 'From Template to Image: Reconstructing Fingerprints from Minutiae Points' was published by the Institute of Electrical and Electronics Engineers.

In 2002 the NGO Privacy International raised an alert that tens of thousands of UK school children were being fingerprinted by schools, often without the knowledge or consent of their parents. In 2002, the supplier Micro Librarian Systems, which use a technology similar to that used in US prisons and the German military, estimated that 350 schools throughout Britain were using such systems, to replace library cards. In 2007, it was estimated that 3,500 schools (ten times more) are using such systems. By 2009 the number of children fingerprinted was estimated to be two million.

In the Protection of Freedoms Act; Part 1 "Regulation of Biometric Data", Chapter 2 schools and colleges are required to obtain the consent of one parent of a child under 18 for acquiring and processing the child's biometric information, and the Act gives the child rights to stop the processing of their biometric information regardless of any parental consent. It also states if any parent of the child objects to the processing of biometric information it must also be discontinued.

In addition to this schools are subject to the Data Protection Act and the Human Rights Act.

Privacy International warned that the practice of finger printing for the purpose of library cards was in clear violation of the Human Rights Act and the Data Protection Act: The law states that privacy invasion must be proportionate to the threat. A few lost library cards do not warrant mass finger printing. It is also likely that the practice breaches Article 16 of the UN Convention on the Rights of the Child, that 'no child shall be subjected to arbitrary or unlawful interference with his or her privacy...'"

Others claim that under the Data Protection Act (DPA), schools in the UK do not have to ask parental consent for such practices. Parents opposed to such practices may only bring individual complaints against schools. Regardless of this the child's rights under the Protection of Freedoms Act remain unaffected.

Concerns have been raised about the civil liberties implications of fingerprinting children in schools. In 2007 Early Day Motion 686, which called on the UK Government to conduct a full and open consultation with stakeholders about the use of biometrics in schools, secured the support of 85 Members of Parliament.

In response to a complaint which they are continuing to pursue, in 2010 the European Commission expressed 'significant concerns' over the proportionality and necessity of the practice and the lack of judicial redress, indicating that the practice may break the European Union data protection directive.

== Belgium ==
The alleged use of taking children's fingerprints is to struggle against school truancy and/or to replace library cards or money for meals by fingerprint locks. In Belgium, this practice gave rise to a question in Parliament on February 6, 2007 by Michel de La Motte (Humanist Democratic Centre) to the Education Minister Marie Arena, who replied that they were legal insofar as the school did not use them for external purposes nor to survey the private life of children. Such practices have also been used in France (Angers, Carqueiranne college in the Var — the latter won the Big Brother Award of 2005 for its hand geometry system, etc.) although the CNIL, official organism in charge of protection of privacy, has declared them "disproportionate.". The CNIL, however, declared in 2002 hand geometry systems to be acceptable.

== Brazil ==
In 2026, ANPD suspended the collection of students biometrics by public schools in Paraná, as the state government hadn't presented a legal basis to do so, besides difficulty on oversight, excessive data processing and concerns over security. ANPD said no evidences were shown which supported that the use of technology attended the students' best interest. The system could store students' biometrics like photos and fingerprints up to 14 years.

== Early applications ==
The first reported use of biometric systems in U.S. schools was at Minnesota's Eagan High School in March 1997. Eagan High School, a testing ground for education technology since it opened, allowed willing students to use fingerprint readers to speed up the borrowing of library books.

Penn Cambria School District in Cresson, PA was another earlier user of biometric technology. In 2000, Food Service Solutions, a local software development company, designed and implemented a system where students bought lunch with just a fingerprint. The American Civil Liberties Union stated that this "could hasten the end of privacy rights".

Biometric systems were first used in schools in the UK in 2001. Use of this technology in schools has become wider spread, although there are currently no official figures for how many schools employ the technology.

== Applications ==
Biometric technologies in schools are used to borrow library books, for cashless canteen systems, vending machines, class attendance, use of printers, and payments into schools. Biometric technologies for home/school bus journeys are also under development.

== Ages ==
Biometric systems can be used by children as young as three years old.

== Current usage ==
The two countries at the forefront employing biometric technology in schools are the UK and the United States. Biometric systems are also used in some schools in Belgium and Sweden but were withdrawn from China and Hong Kong schools due to privacy concerns. It was reported in August 2007 that Dubai are soon due to issue guidance to schools.

== Security concerns ==
Concerns about the security implications of using conventional biometric templates in schools have been raised by a number of leading IT security experts, including Kim Cameron, architect of identity and access in the connected systems division at Microsoft, who cites research by Cavoukian and Stoianov to back up his assertion that "it is absolutely premature to begin using 'conventional biometrics' in schools". Invenda vending machines serviced by Adaria Vending Services and selling Mars Inc. products at the University of Waterloo caused uproar in February 2024 when students discovered the machines used facial recognition systems without knowledge or consent of the purchasers. Invenda and Adaria claimed that the software complied with GDPR, but the students remained unconvinced, and the vending machines were eventually removed.

== Advantages ==
Biometric vendors claim benefits to schools such as improved reading skills, decreased wait times in lunch lines and increased revenues. They do not cite independent research to support this. Educationalist Dr. Sandra Leaton Gray of Homerton College, Cambridge stated in early 2007 that:

I have not been able to find a single piece of published research which suggests that the use of biometrics in schools promotes healthy eating or improves reading skills amongst children... There is absolutely no evidence for such claims.

== See also ==
- Biometrics
- Fingerprinting
- Big Brother
- Privacy International
