= Keystroke dynamics =

Biometrics from keystrokes

Keystroke dynamics, keystroke biometrics, typing dynamics, or typing biometrics refer to the collection of biometric information generated by key-press-related events that occur when a user types on a keyboard. Use of patterns in key operation to identify operators predates modern computing, and has been proposed as an authentication alternative to passwords and PIN numbers.

== Science ==
The behavioral biometric of keystroke dynamics uses the manner and rhythm in which an individual types characters on a keyboard or keypad. The user's keystroke rhythms are measured to develop a unique biometric template of the user's typing pattern for future authentication. Keystrokes are separated into static and dynamic typing, which are used to help distinguish between authorized and unauthorized users. Vibration information may be used to create a pattern for future use in both identification and authentication tasks.

== History ==
During the late nineteenth century, it was discovered that individual telegram operators each had a unique "fist", or rhythm that they used to tap out Morse code. An experienced operator could recognize another operator based on "fist" alone, similar to a voice or fingerprint. As late as World War II, the military transmitted messages through Morse code, and military intelligence utilized each individual operator's unique "fist" as a way of tracking individual ships or detachments, and for traffic analysis.

Keyboard dynamics received attention as a potential alternative to short PIN numbers, which were widely used for authentication early in the expansion of networked computing.

== Collection and potential use of keystroke dynamics data ==
The behavioral biometric of keystroke dynamics uses the manner and rhythm in which an individual types characters on a keyboard or keypad. The user's keystroke rhythms are measured to develop a unique biometric template of the user's typing pattern for future authentication. Keystrokes are separated into static and dynamic typing, which are used to help distinguish between authorized and unauthorized users. Vibration information may be used to create a pattern for future use in both identification and authentication tasks.

Keystroke dynamic information could be used to verify or determine the identity of the person producing the keystrokes. The techniques used to do this vary widely in sophistication and range from statistical techniques to artificial intelligence (AI) approaches such as neural networks.

The time to seek and depress a key (seek-time) and the time the key is held down (hold-time) may be characteristic of an individual, regardless of the total speed at which they type. Most people take longer to find or get to specific letters on the keyboard than their average seek-time for all letters. Which letters require more time vary dramatically and consistently for different people. Right-handed people may be statistically faster in getting to keys they hit with their right-hand fingers than with their left-hand fingers. Index fingers may be faster than other fingers, consistent for a user, regardless of their overall speed.

In addition, sequences of letters may have characteristic properties for a user. In English, the use of "the" is very common, and those three letters may be known as a rapid-fire sequence. Common endings, such as "ing", may be entered far faster than the same letters in reverse order ("gni") to the degree that varies consistently by user. This consistency may hold and reveal common sequences of the user's native language even when they are writing entirely in a different language.

Common "errors" may also be quite characteristic of a user. There is a taxonomy of errors, such as the user's most common "substitutions", "reversals", "drop-outs", "double-strikes", "adjacent letter hits", "homonyms" and hold-length-errors (for a shift key held down too short or too long a time). Even without knowing what language the user is working in, these errors may be detected by looking at the rest of the text and what letters the user goes back and replaces.

== Authentication versus identification ==
Keystroke dynamics is part of a larger class of biometrics known as behavioral biometrics, a field in which observed patterns are statistical in nature. Because of this inherent uncertainty, a commonly held belief is that behavioral biometrics are not as reliable as biometrics used for authentication based on physically observable characteristics such as fingerprints or retinal scans or DNA. Behavioral biometrics use a confidence measurement in replacement of the traditional pass/fail measurements. As such, the traditional benchmarks of False Acceptance Rate (FAR) and False Rejection Rates (FRR) no longer have linear relationships.

The benefit to keystroke dynamics (as well as other behavioral biometrics) is that FRR/FAR can be adjusted by changing the acceptance threshold at the individual level. This allows for explicitly defined individual risk mitigation that physical biometric technologies could not achieve.

One of the major problems that keystroke dynamics runs into is that a user's typing varies substantially during a day and between different days and may be affected by any number of external factors.

Because of these variations, any system will make false-positive and false-negative errors. Some successful commercial products have strategies to handle these issues and have proven effective in large-scale use in real-world settings and applications.

== Legal and regulatory issues ==
Use of keylogging software may be in direct and explicit violation of local laws, such as the U.S. Patriot Act, under which such use may constitute wire-tapping.

== Patents ==
- US patent 11914690, Raul-Laviniu Popa, and Kyle Hunt, "Systems and Methods for Using Typing Characteristics for Authentication", issued 2024
- US patent 9430626, John D. Rome, Bethann G. Rome and Thomas E. Ketcham II, "User authentication via known text input cadence", issued 2012
- US patent 7509686, John C. Checco, "Method for providing computer-based authentication utilizing biometrics", issued 2009
- US patent 7206938, S. Blender and H. Postley, "Key sequence rhythm recognition system and method", issued 2007
- US patent 4621334, J. Garcia, "Personal identification apparatus", issued 1986
- US patent 4805222, J.R. Young and R.W. Hammon, "Method and apparatus for verifying an individual's identity", issued 1989
- P. Nordström, J. Johansson. Security system and method for detecting intrusion in a computerized system. Patent No. 2 069 993, European Patent Office, 2009.
- US patent 8230232, A. Awad and I. Traore, "System and method for determining a computer user profile from a motion-based input device", issued 2012

== Other uses ==
Because human beings generate keystroke timings, they are not well correlated with external processes. They are frequently used as a source of hardware-generated random numbers for computer systems.

Mental health symptoms such as depression and anxiety have also been correlated with keystroke timing features.

== See also ==
- Fist (telegraphy)
