= Signature recognition =

Identification based on handwriting

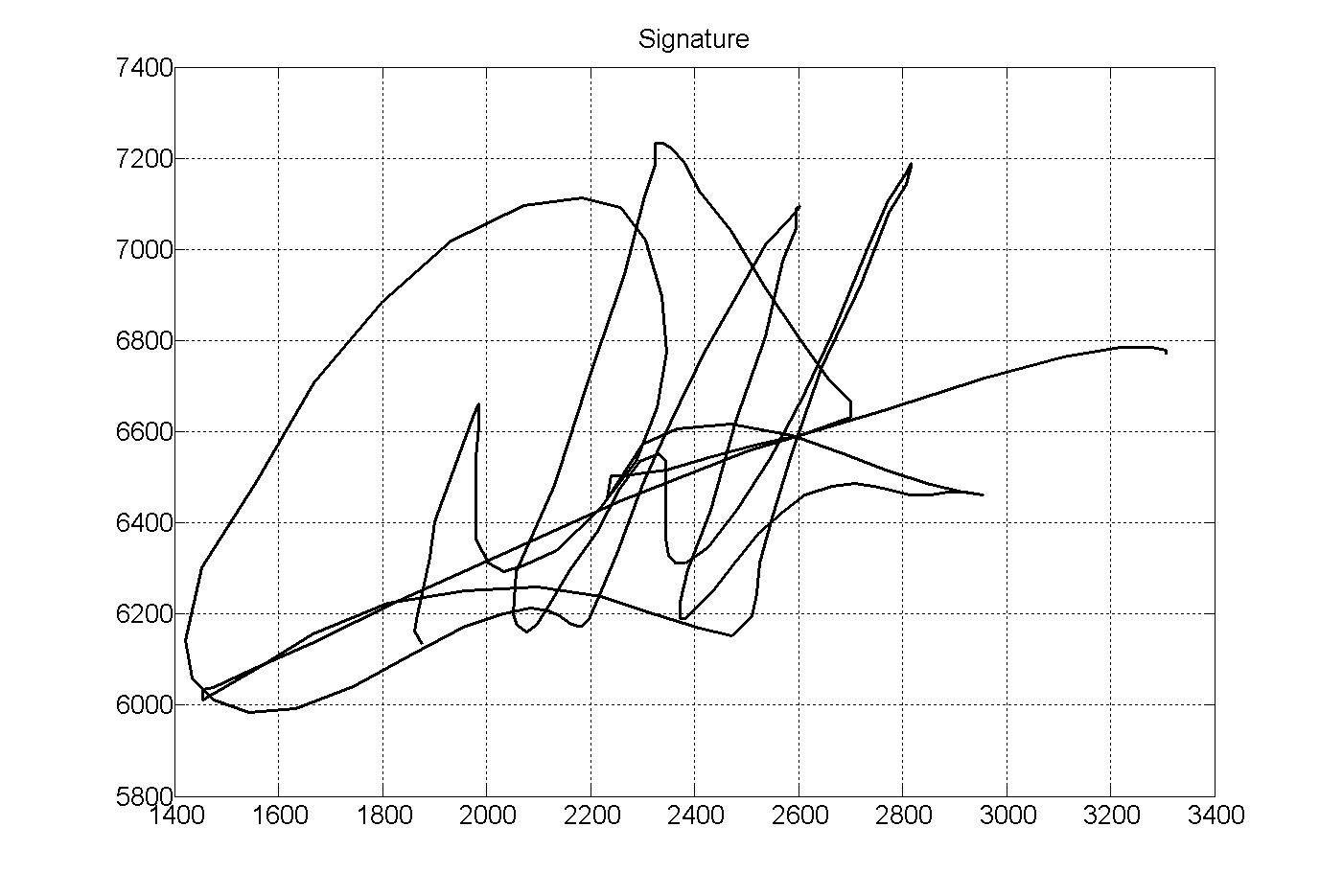
Example of signature shape.

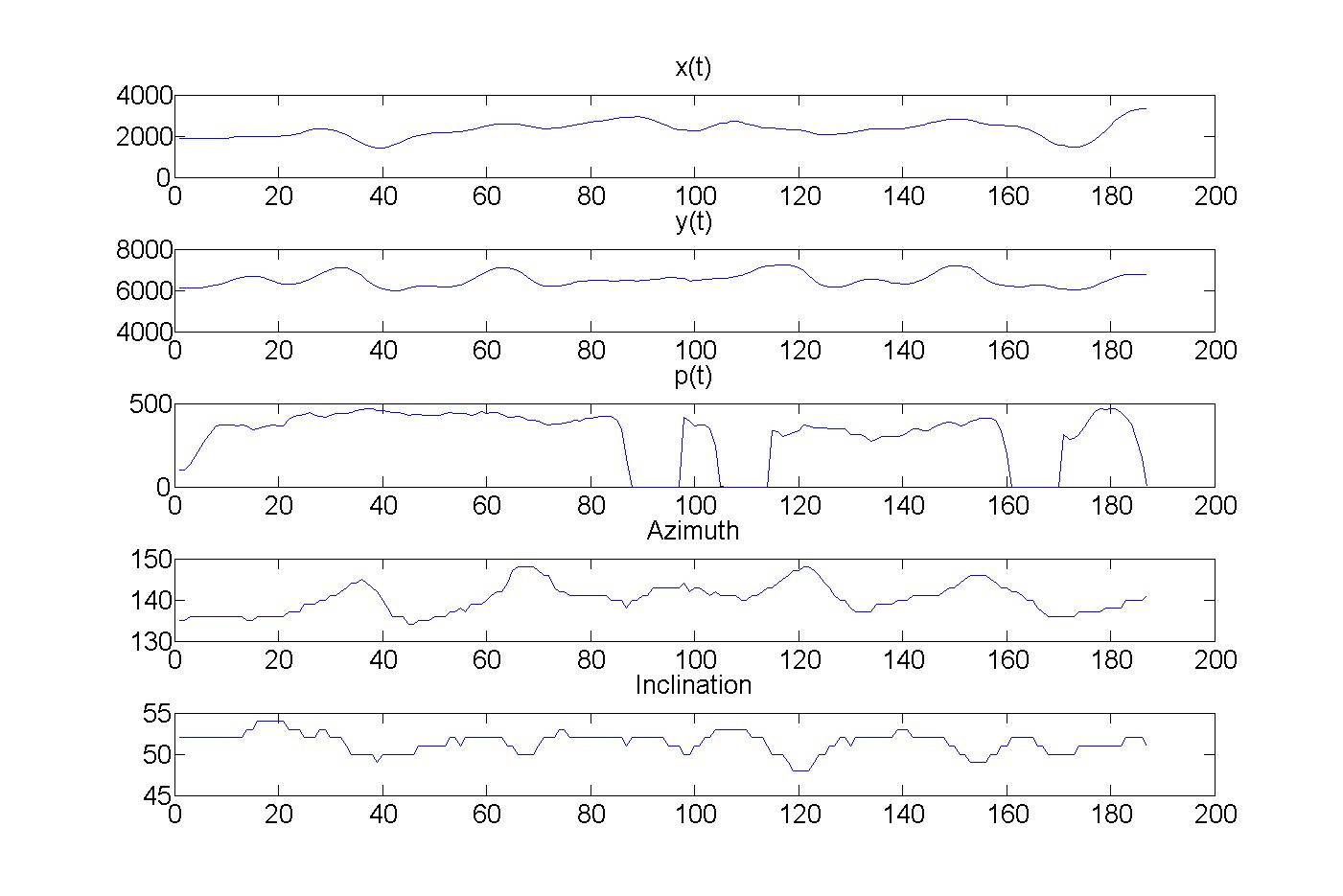
Example of dynamic information of a signature. Looking at the pressure information it can be seen that the user has lift the pen 3 times in the middle of the signature (areas with pressure equal to zero).

Signature recognition is an example of behavioral biometrics that identifies a person based on their handwriting. It can be operated in two different ways:

Static: In this mode, users write their signature on paper, and after the writing is complete, it is digitized through an optical scanner or a camera to turn the signature image into bits. The biometric system then recognizes the signature analyzing its shape. This group is also known as "off-line".

Dynamic: In this mode, users write their signature in a digitizing tablet, which acquires the signature in real time. Another possibility is the acquisition by means of stylus-operated PDAs. Some systems also operate on smart-phones or tablets with a capacitive screen, where users can sign using a finger or an appropriate pen. Dynamic recognition is also known as "on-line". Dynamic information usually consists of the following information:

- spatial coordinate x(t)
- spatial coordinate y(t)
- pressure p(t)
- azimuth az(t)
- inclination in(t)
- pen up/down

The state-of-the-art in signature recognition can be found in the last major international competition.

The most popular pattern recognition techniques applied for signature recognition are dynamic time warping, hidden Markov models and vector quantization. Combinations of different techniques also exist.

== Related techniques ==
Recently, a handwritten biometric approach has also been proposed. In this case, the user is recognized analyzing his handwritten text (see also Handwritten biometric recognition).

== Databases ==
Several public databases exist, being the most popular ones SVC, and MCYT.
