= USC Division of Biokinesiology and Physical Therapy =

Physiotherapy research organization

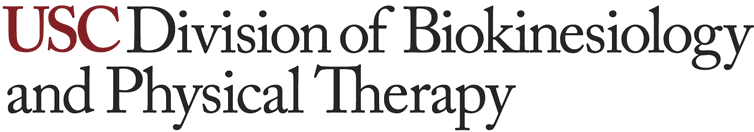
- Established: 1945
- Director: James Gordon
- Academic staff: Total 124; Full-Time 25; Clinical 34; Adjunct 39
- Administrative staff: 34
- Students: DPT 280; PhD 30; MS 8 Physical Therapy Residents 10
- Location: Los Angeles, California, United States
- Website: pt.usc.edu

The USC Division of Biokinesiology and Physical Therapy is a division of the Herman Ostrow School of Dentistry at the University of Southern California, focusing on research, training, and practice related to physical therapy and rehabilitation. The division grants doctoral degrees in physical therapy (DPT) and biokinesiology (PhD), as well as master's degrees in biokinesiology. In addition, the division offers residency programs in orthopedic physical therapy, neurologic physical therapy, sports physical therapy, as well as pediatric physical therapy.

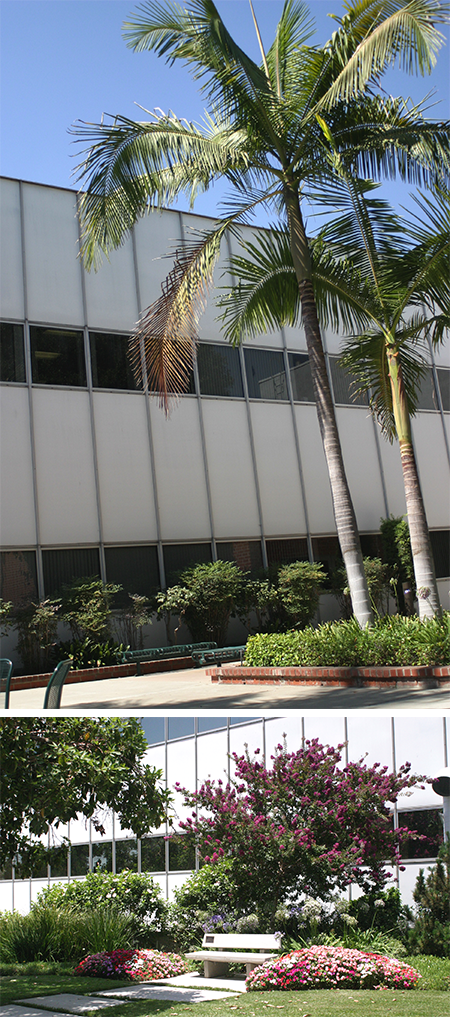
The education and research activities of the USC Division of Biokinesiology and Physical Therapy are housed in the Center for Health Professions building on the Health Science Campus of the University of Southern California.

== History ==
The precursor of the Division of Biokinesiology and Physical Therapy was established as an apprenticeship program at the Orthopedic Hospital of Los Angeles in 1942. The physical therapy program was started by Charles Lowman, who was an orthopedic physician trained at USC, and Susan Roen, who was the head physical therapist at the Orthopedic Hospital and an assistant instructor in the USC Physical Education Department. Their successful cooperation, especially in underwater therapy, drew international attention; President Franklin D. Roosevelt consulted with Lowman about therapy for his illness. Catherine Worthingham - who graduated under their guidance - went on to contribute greatly to the physical therapy profession through education, practice, and research, and advanced the profession to a high level of influence in rehabilitation.

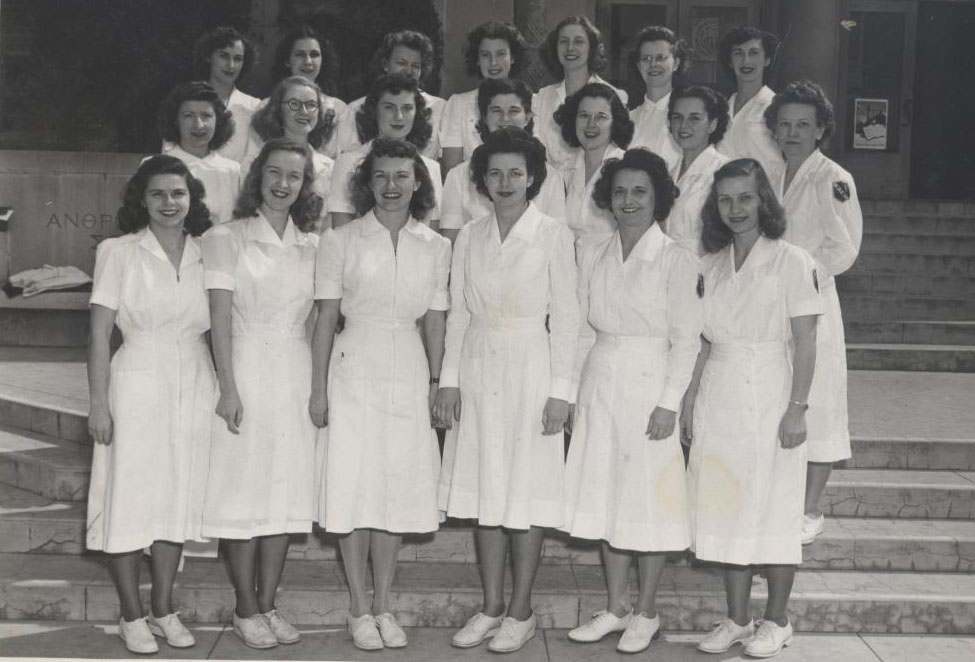
The first graduating class of the Department of Physical Therapy at USC, 1946.

The 1940s was an important period for physical and occupational therapy education with an increased focus on university-based baccalaureate programs. In 1945, the Physical Therapy department was established at USC's University Park Campus with two programs offered: a certificate program for college graduates and a baccalaureate program. Charlotte W. Anderson, who had been a core faculty in the War Emergency Program, was the first chairperson of the Physical Therapy department. The Physical Therapy program at USC was accredited by American Medical Association (AMA) in 1946. The first class with a Certificate in Physical Therapy graduated from USC in the same year while the first BS degree candidate graduated in 1947. In order to prepare teachers for physical therapy schools, a post-professional graduate M.A. program was established at USC in 1947 as the second program of its kind in the US. The first MA candidate graduated in 1950. While physical therapy was a fairly new professional field for men at that time, the first male students were admitted to the physical therapy program in 1950.

The physical therapy department at USC developed and expanded quickly during the 1960s. Margret S. Rood became the chair of the department in 1960. She was a physical therapist and occupational therapist and proposed a well-known system of therapeutic exercises to treat neuromuscular dysfunction called the Rood approach. Margret S. Rood stepped down as chair in 1966. In 1966, the first faculty with a PhD degree, Frances Grover, was hired to teach anatomy. Margaret Bryce, who chaired the department until 1975, contributed greatly to physical therapy management in lower extremity amputees.

1971 was a landmark year for the department as it moved to Rancho Los Amigos Hospital in Downey to initiate a new paradigm in US rehabilitation medicine. Also in 1971, USC established a master's degree in clinical physical therapy including clinical fellows at Rancho Los Amigos. By moving the division to Rancho Los Amigos, students were not only able to access skillful physical therapists, but also able to have better hands on experience in physical therapy practice. Helen Hislop was appointed chair of the department in 1975; Hislop intensively developed the graduate-level physical therapy program. Also, the final BS class graduated in 1975 and all physical therapy graduate degrees were shifted from MA to MS In 1978, the department established the first physical therapy PhD program in the nation, and accepted three PhD students. Jacquelin Perry, who was a director of the pathokinesiology lab at Rancho Los Amigos and a recognized expert in gait analysis and polio, tremendously contributed to the development of the PhD program in physical therapy at USC.

The 1980s and 1990s were periods defined by many firsts in the division. The first doctoral degree in physical therapy from USC was awarded to Mary Beth Brown in 1984. In 1989, an independent faculty practice, USC Physical Therapy Associates, was established with Rob Landel as director. The department changed its name to the Department of Biokinesiology and Physical Therapy in 1993 to reflect its expanding research mission. Eighty-four students were admitted to the first entry-level DPT class in 1995 and graduated three years later. In 1996, 15 graduates were awarded the first post-professional DPT degrees from USC. After 23 years of service as department chair, Helen Hislop stepped down in 1998 and Sandra Howell was named acting chair in her place. This same year, the inaugural class of two residents was admitted to the Orthopedic Physical Therapy residency program at USC, the first academically based residency in the US.

James Gordon became the new chair of the department in July 2000. In 2003, the Department of Nursing closed and the university provost announced that the Independent Health Professions would be phased out. This precipitated a major change for the department, which became the Division of Biokinesiology and Physical Therapy of the Herman Ostrow School of Dentistry in 2006.

In 2017, the department began offering online DPT programs.

== Distinctions ==
The Doctor of Physical Therapy program has been ranked first among physical therapy schools by U.S. News & World Report since 2004.

== Notable alumni ==
See also List of University of Southern California people

- Judy Burnfield, Director of the Athletic Performance Laboratory at University of Nebraska–Lincoln
- Judith E. Deutsch, Faculty member-Rutgers University
