= Jacquelin Perry =

American physician and surgeon

- Born: May 31, 1918
- Died: March 11, 2013 (aged 94)
- Occupation: physician

Jacquelin Perry, M.D. (May 31, 1918 – March 11, 2013) was an American physician. Perry made major contributions to the fields of post-polio syndrome and gait analysis. A building named after her stands at Rancho Los Amigos National Rehabilitation Center.

== Biography ==
Perry was born on May 31, 1918 in Denver, Colorado before moving to California in 1924. Perry graduated from the University of California, Los Angeles in 1940 with a bachelor's degree in physical education. Perry then joined the Army, where she received a certificate in physical therapy at Walter Reed General Hospital in Washington, D.C.. During World War II, Perry worked as a physical therapist treating Polio patients in Hot Springs, Arkansas. Following the war, Perry used the G.I. Bill in order to attend medical education at the University of California, San Francisco. Perry completed her medical degree and residency at University of California, San Francisco in 1950 and 1955 respectively. In 1958, Perry became a board certified orthopedic surgeon through the American Board of Orthopaedic Surgery.

In 1955, Perry joined Rancho Los Amigos National Rehabilitation Center, where she would remain for the rest of her career. Perry researched the orthopedic management of Polio survivors, with a primary focus on returning to activities of daily life and restoring function. Perry's initial patients were children who had Polio, which resulted in respiratory issues and paraplegia. Perry then worked on various orthopedic surgeries with the team in Downey, California. Notably, Perry performed surgeries on adults who had spinal cord injuries that resulted in paraplegia and patients with cerebral palsy; Perry performed spinal fusion surgeries on paralyzed Polio patients in an effort to help increase their mobility. Perry, alongside Vernon Nickel, designed the halo-gravity traction device for patients that had undergone spinal fusion surgery; the halo is a fixation device that includes metal rods and a ring that attaches to the skull with four screws and immobilizes the spine and neck.

Perry was forced to leave surgery when she sustained a cerebral artery thrombosis in the late 1960s. Returning to her earlier education in physical therapy, Perry began to focus on research in gait analysis and human movement. In 1968, Perry opened the Pathokinesiology Laboratory at Rancho Los Amigos National Rehabilitation Center to continue her work in gait analysis and help teach other healthcare providers. Perry's initial focus was on organizing visual gait analysis to identify and correct pathological movements and improve pre- and post-operative surgical evaluation. Perry wrote the textbook Gait Analysis: Normal and Pathological Function in conjunction with Judith M Burnfield in 1992.
