= Gait Analysis: Normal and Pathological Function =

Book by Jacquelin Perry

- Cover of Second Edition (2010)
- Author: Jacquelin Perry; Judith M. Burnfield
- Language: English
- Subject: Gait
- Genre: Textbook
- Publisher: SLACK Incorporated
- Publication date: 1992 (1st ed.); 2010 (2nd ed.)
- Pages: 576
- ISBN: 978-1-55642-766-4

Gait Analysis: Normal and Pathological Function is a textbook that focuses on human gait analysis and is written by Jacquelin Perry and Judith M. Burnfield. It is an updated and revised version of Gait Analysis: Normal and Pathological Function (1992), a text many consider to be a staple for the curriculum of education of gait analysis. It is frequently cited in academic publications as well as journals for orthopedics, physical therapy and athletic training.

== Editions ==
- Jacquelin Perry (1992). Gait Analysis: Normal and Pathological Function. Thorofare, New Jersey: SLACK Incorporated. ISBN 978-1-55642-192-1.
- (2010) 2nd edition. Thorofare, New Jersey: SLACK Incorporated. ISBN 978-1-55642-766-4.
