= Gait kinetic index =

The gait kinetic index (GKI) is the systematic study of the human motion, based on the gait analysis, which allows to measure extensively the gait pathology taking into consideration kinetic aspects of gait pattern.

== History ==
The gait kinetic index is based on the gait analysis, and was proposed by Veronica Cimolin, Pier Francesco Costici, Claudia Condoluci and Manuela Galli publishing an article on Computer Methods in Biomechanics and Biomedical Engineering Journal. They proposed the GKI after applied this method on 57 patients with diplegic cerebral palsy and 18 subjects with no known gait pathology.

== Parameters ==
It is based on six variables:

1. Hip moment
2. Knee moment
3. Ankle moment
4. Hip power
5. Knee power
6. Ankle power
