= Lordosis =

Abnormal inward curvature of the lower spine

- Diagram showing normal curvature (posterior concavity) of the cervical (neck) and lumbar (lower back) vertebral column (spine)
- Specialty: Rheumatology, medical genetics
- Diagnostic method: X-ray, MRI, CT Scan

Lordosis is historically defined as an abnormal inward curvature of the lumbar spine. However, the terms lordosis and lordotic are also used to refer to the normal inward curvature of the lumbar and cervical regions of the human spine. Similarly, kyphosis historically refers to abnormal convex curvature of the spine. The normal outward (convex) curvature in the thoracic and sacral regions is also termed kyphosis or kyphotic. The term comes from Greek lordos 'bent backward'.

Lordosis in the human spine makes it easier for humans to bring the bulk of their mass over the pelvis. This allows for a much more efficient walking gait than that of other primates, whose inflexible spines cause them to resort to an inefficient forward-leaning "bent-knee, bent-waist" gait. As such, lordosis in the human spine is considered one of the primary physiological adaptations of the human skeleton that allows for human gait to be as energetically efficient as it is.

Lumbar hyperlordosis is excessive extension of the lumbar region, and is commonly called hollow back or saddle back (after a similar condition that affects some horses). Sway back is a different condition with a different cause, that at a glance can mimic the outward appearance of lumbar hyperlordosis. Lumbar kyphosis is an abnormally straight (or in severe cases flexed) lumbar region.

== Types ==
=== Lumbar lordosis ===
Normal lordotic curvatures, also known as secondary curvatures, result in a difference in the thickness between the front and back parts of the intervertebral disc. Lordosis may also increase at puberty, sometimes not becoming evident until the early or mid-20s.

In radiology, a lordotic view is an X-ray taken of a patient leaning backward.

=== Lumbar hyperlordosis ===
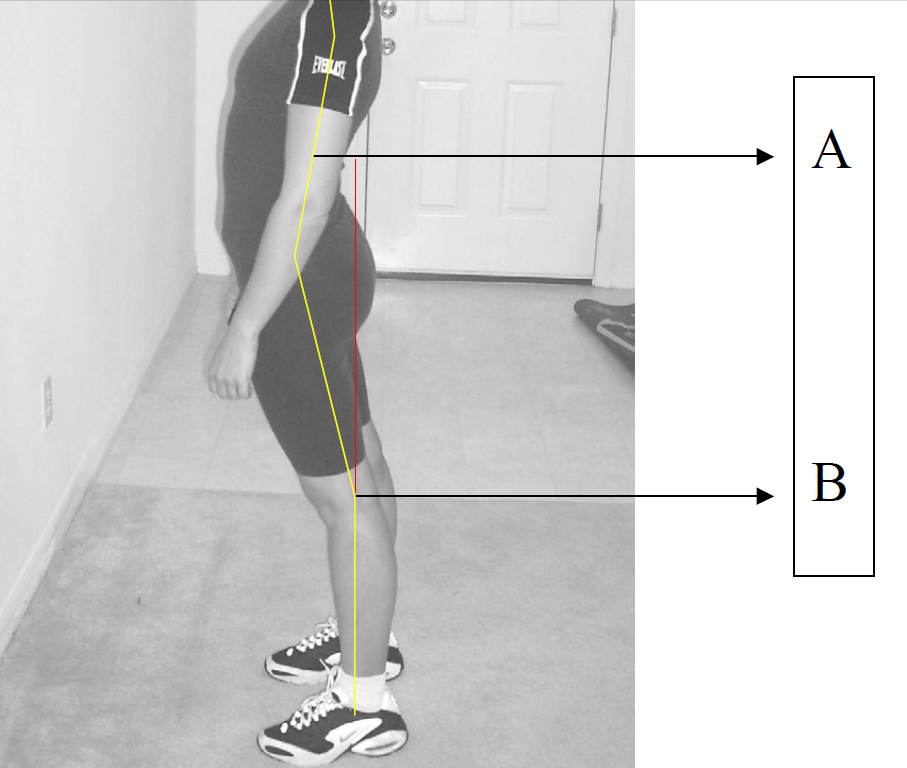
Lumbar hyperlordosis

Lumbar hyperlordosis is a condition that occurs when the lumbar region (lower back) experiences stress or extra weight and becomes arched more than normal, sometimes leading to muscle pain or spasms. It is a common postural position in which the natural curve of the lumbar region of the back is slightly or dramatically accentuated. Commonly known as swayback, it is common in dancers. Imbalances in muscle strength and length are one cause of this excessive stress to the lower back, such as weak hamstrings and tight hip flexors (psoai). A major feature of lumbar hyperlordosis is a forward pelvic tilt, resulting in the pelvis resting on top of the thighs.

Other health conditions and disorders can cause hyperlordosis. Achondroplasia (a disorder where bones grow abnormally, which can result in short stature as in dwarfism), spondylolisthesis (a condition in which vertebrae slip forward), and osteoporosis (the most common bone disease in which bone density is lost resulting in bone weakness and increased likelihood of fracture) are some of the most common causes of hyperlordosis. Other causes include obesity, hyperkyphosis (spine curvature disorder in which the thoracic curvature is abnormally rounded), discitis (inflammation of the intervertebral disc space caused by infection), and benign juvenile lordosis. Other factors may also include rare diseases, including Ehlers–Danlos syndrome (EDS), where some joints throughout the body are so hyper-extensible that they can become unstable (i.e. problematically much more flexible than normal, frequently to the point of partial or full dislocation). With such hyper-extensibility, it is also quite common (if not the norm) for some of the muscles surrounding an unstable joint to compensate for that instability by contracting.

Excessive lordotic curvature – lumbar hyperlordosis, is also called "hollow back", and "saddle back" (after a similar condition that affects some horses); swayback usually refers to a nearly opposite postural misalignment that can initially look quite similar. Common causes of lumbar hyperlordosis include tight low back muscles, excessive visceral fat, and pregnancy. Rickets, a vitamin D deficiency in children, can cause lumbar hyperlordosis.

=== Lumbar hypolordosis ===
Being less common than lumbar hyperlordosis, hypolordosis (also known as flatback) occurs when there's less of a curve in the lower back or a flattening of the lower back. This occurs because the vertebrae are oriented toward the back of the spine, stretching the disc towards the back and compressing it in the front. This can cause a narrowing of the opening for the nerves, potentially pinching them.

== Signs and symptoms ==
Lumbar hyperlordosis (also known as anterior pelvic tilt) has a noticeable impact on the height of individuals with this medical issue, a height loss of 0.5–2.5 inches (1.27–6.25 centimeters) is common.

For example, the height loss was measured by measuring the patient's height while standing straight (with exaggerated curves in the upper and lower back) and again after the patient fixed this issue (with no exaggerated curves), both of these measurements were taken in the morning with a gap of 6 months and the growth plates of the patient were checked to make sure that they were closed to rule out natural growth. The height loss occurs in the torso region and once the person fixes their back, the person's Body Mass Index will reduce since the person is taller and the stomach will also appear to be slimmer.

However, the cause of height loss in both situations is a little different even though the impact is similar. In the first scenario, it can be due to a genetic condition, trauma to the spine, pregnancy in women, increased abdominal fat, or a sedentary lifestyle (sitting too much causes muscle imbalances and is the most common reason for this issue).

Merely slouching doesn't cause height loss, even though it may make a person look shorter, slouching may lead to perceived height loss, whereas lumbar hyperlordosis leads to actual and measured height loss. To make it easier to understand the difference, people losing a vertebra (which is around 2 inches or 5 centimeters in height) in the spine will be shorter regardless of posture. Lumbar hyperlordosis, of course, doesn't make you lose a vertebra but it bends them in such a way that your spine's vertical height is reduced.

Although lumbar hyperlordosis gives an impression of a stronger back, it can lead to moderate to severe lower back pain. The most problematic symptom is that of a herniated disc where the individual has put so much strain on the back that the discs between the vertebrae have been damaged or have ruptured. Technical problems with dancing such as difficulty in the positions of attitude and arabesque can be a sign of weak iliopsoas. Tightness of the iliopsoas results in a dancer having difficulty lifting their leg into high positions. Abdominal muscles being weak and the rectus femoris of the quadriceps being tight are signs that improper muscles are being worked while dancing which leads to lumbar hyperlordosis. The most obvious signs of lumbar hyperlordosis are lower back pain in dancing and pedestrian activities as well as having the appearance of a swayed back.

== Causes ==
Possible causes that lead to the condition of lumbar hyperlordosis are the following:

- Spine – Natural factors of how spines are formed greatly increase certain individuals' likelihood to experience a strain or sprain in their back or neck. Factors such as having more lumbar vertebrae allowing for too much flexibility, and then in cases of less lumbar the individual not reaching their necessity for flexibility and then pushing their bodies to injury.
- Legs – Another odd body formation is when an individual has a leg shorter than the other, which can be an immediate cause for the imbalance of hips then putting strain on the posture of the back which an individual has to adjust into vulnerable positions to meet aesthetic appearances. This can lead to permanent damage to the back. Genu recurvatum (swaying back knees) is also a factor that forces a dancer to adjust to unstable postures.
- Hips – Common problems in the hips are tight hip flexors, which causes poor lifting posture, hip flexion contracture, which means the lack of postural awareness, and thoracic hyperkyphosis, which causes the individual to compensate for limited hip turn out (which is essential to dances such as ballet). Weak psoas (short for iliopsoas-muscle that controls the hip flexor) forces the dancer to lift from the strength of their back instead of from the hip when lifting their leg into arabesque or attitude. This causes great stress and risk of injury, especially because the dancer will have to compensate to obtain the positions required.
- Muscles – One of the greatest contributors is uneven muscles. Because all muscles have a muscle that works in opposition to it. It is imperative that to keep all muscles protected, the opposite muscle is not stronger than the muscle at risk. In the situation of lumbar lordosis, abdominal muscles are weaker than the muscles in the lumbar spine and the hamstring muscles. The muscular imbalance results in pulling down the pelvis in the front of the body, creating a swayback in the spine.
- Growth spurt – Younger dancers are more at risk for the development of lumbar hyperlordosis because the lumbar fascia and hamstrings tighten when a child starts to experience a growth spurt into adolescence.

Technical factors

- Improper lifts – When male dancers are performing dance lifts with another dancer they are extremely prone to lift in the incorrect posture, pushing their arms up to lift the other dancer, while letting their core and spine curve which is easy to then hyperlordosis in a dancer's back.
- Overuse – Over 45% of anatomical sites of injury in dancers are in the lower back. This can be attributed to the strains of repetitive dance training which may lead to minor trauma. If the damaged site is not given time to heal the damage of the injury will increase. Abrupt increases in dance intensity or sudden changes in dance choreography do not allow the body to adapt to the new stresses. New styles of dance, returning to dance, or increasing dance time by a great deal will result in exhaustion of the body.

== Diagnosis ==
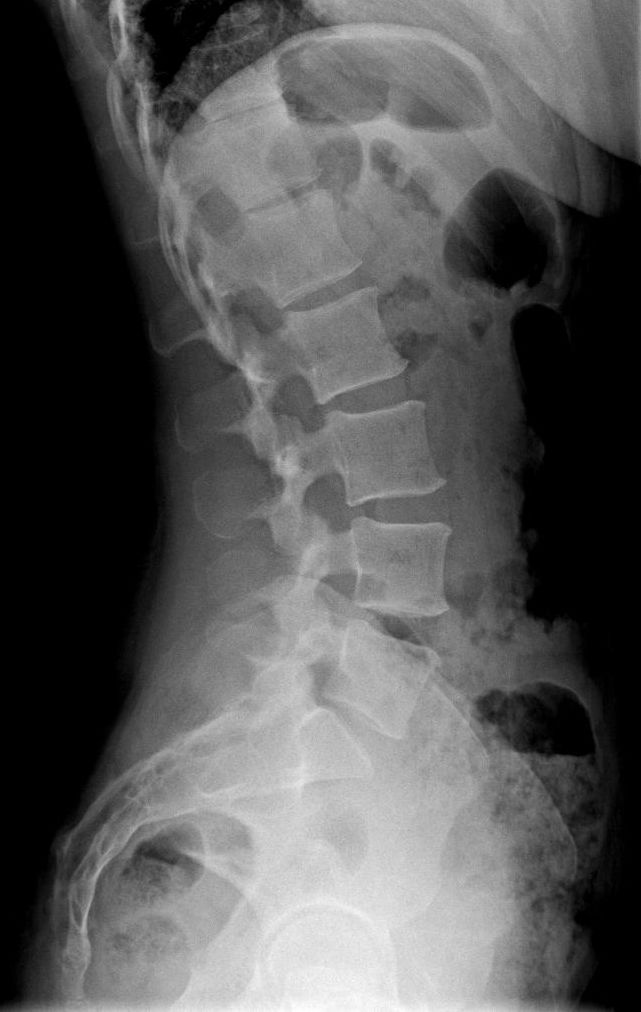
X-ray of lumbar hyperlordosis

Measurement and diagnosis of lumbar hyperlordosis can be difficult. Obliteration of vertebral end-plate landmarks by interbody fusion may make the traditional measurement of segmental lumbar lordosis more difficult. Because the L4–L5 and L5–S1 levels are most commonly involved in fusion procedures or arthrodesis and contribute to normal lumbar lordosis, it is helpful to identify a reproducible and accurate means of measuring segmental lordosis at these levels. A visible sign of hyperlordosis is an abnormally large arch of the lower back and the person appears to be puffing out their stomach and buttocks.

=== Scanning ===
==== X-ray ====
Precise diagnosis is done by looking at a complete medical history, physical examination, and other tests of the patient. X-rays are used to measure the lumbar curvature. On a lateral X-ray, a normal range of the lordotic curvature of between 20° and 60° has been proposed by Stagnara et al., as measured from the inferior endplate of T12 to the inferior endplate of L5. The Scoliosis Research Society has proposed a range of 40° and 60° as measured between the upper endplate of Th12 and the upper endplate of S1. Individual studies, although using other reference points, have found normal ranges up to approximately 85°. It is generally more pronounced in females. It is relatively constant through adolescence and young adulthood, but decreases in the elderly.

==== MRI and CT ====
Bone scans are conducted to rule out possible fractures and infections, magnetic resonance imaging (MRI) is used to eliminate the possibility of the spinal cord or nerve abnormalities, and computed tomography scans (CT scans) are used to get a more detailed image of the bones, muscles, and organs of the lumbar region.

== Treatment ==
=== Exercises ===
Some corrective exercises can be done to alleviate this issue, but it may take several months to fix (provided that the person sits less, stands with a neutral pelvis, and sleeps on their back).

Since lumbar hyperlordosis is usually caused by habitual poor posture, rather than by an inherent physical defect like scoliosis or hyperkyphosis, it can be reversed. This can be accomplished by stretching the lower back, hip-flexors, quads and strengthening the abdominal muscles, hamstrings, and glutes. Strengthening the gluteal complex is a commonly accepted practice to reverse excessive lumbar lordosis, as an increase in gluteal muscle tone assists in the reduction of excessive anterior pelvic tilt and lumbar hyperlordosis. Local intra-articular hip pain has been shown to inhibit gluteal contraction potential, meaning that hip pain could be a main contributing factor to gluteal inhibition. Dancers should ensure that they don't strain themselves during dance rehearsals and performances. To help with lifts, the concept of isometric contraction, during which the length of the muscle remains the same during contraction, is important for stability and posture.

Lumbar hyperlordosis may be treated by strengthening the hip extensors on the back of the thighs, and by stretching the hip flexors on the front of the thighs.

Only the muscles on the front and the back of the thighs can rotate the pelvis forward or backward while in a standing position because they can discharge the force on the ground through the legs and feet. Abdominal muscles and erector spinae can't discharge force on an anchor point while standing, unless one is holding his hands somewhere, hence their function will be to flex or extend the torso, not the hip. Back hyper-extensions on a Roman chair or the inflatable ball will strengthen all the posterior chain and will treat hyperlordosis. So too will stiff-legged deadlifts and supine hip lifts and any other similar movement strengthen the posterior chain without involving the hip flexors in the front of the thighs. Abdominal exercises could be avoided altogether if they stimulate too much the psoas and the other hip flexors.

Controversy regarding the degree to which manipulative therapy can help a patient still exists. If therapeutic measures reduce symptoms, but not the measurable degree of lordotic curvature, this could be viewed as a successful outcome of treatment, though based solely on subjective data. The presence of measurable abnormality does not automatically equate with a level of reported symptoms.

=== Braces ===
The Boston brace is a plastic exterior that can be made with a small amount of lordosis to minimize stresses on discs that have experienced herniated discs. In the case where Ehlers Danlos syndrome (EDS) is responsible, being properly fitted with a customized brace may be a solution to avoid strain and limit the frequency of instability.

=== Tai chi ===
While not a treatment, the martial art of tai chi calls for adjusting the lower back curvature (as well as the rest of the spinal curvatures) through specific re-alignments of the pelvis to the thigh; it is referred to in shorthand as 'dropping the tailbone'. The specifics of the structural change are school specific and are part of the jibengong (essential technique) of these schools. The adjustment is referred to in tai chi literature as 'when the lowest vertebrae are plumb erect'.

== See also ==
- Hyperkyphosis
- Kyphoscoliosis
- Lordosis behavior
- Pott's disease
