= Biomechanics (journal) =

- Discipline: Biomechanics, kinesiology, sports biomechanics, gait analysis, musculoskeletal biomechanics
- Language: English
- Edited by: Tibor Hortobágyi

Publication details
- History: 2021–present
- Publisher: MDPI (Switzerland)
- Frequency: Quarterly
- Open access: Yes
- License: Creative Commons Attribution License
- Impact factor: 1.4 (2025)

Standard abbreviations
- ISO 4: Biomechanics

Indexing
- ISSN: 2673-7078
- OCLC no.: 1283732958

Links
- Journal homepage

Biomechanics is a quarterly peer-reviewed open-access scientific journal covering research on biomechanics, human movement, kinesiology, sports biomechanics, gait analysis, rehabilitation, and musculoskeletal biomechanics. It is published by MDPI and was established in 2021.

The journal publishes original research articles, review articles, communications, and other contributions related to motion and sports biomechanics, rehabilitation, medical implants, biomechanical modelling, and animal locomotion.

== Abstracting and indexing ==
The journal is abstracted and indexed in, for example:

- Directory of Open Access Journals
- Academic Search (EBSCO)
- Scopus
- Web of Science (Emerging Sources Citation Index)

According to the Journal Citation Reports, the journal has a 2025 impact factor of 1.4.
