= Christian Wilhelm Braune =

German anatomist (1831–1892)

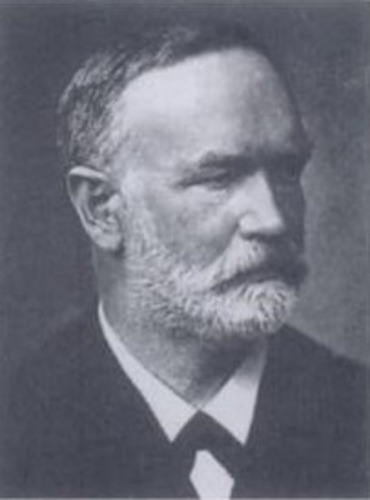
Christian Wilhelm Braune

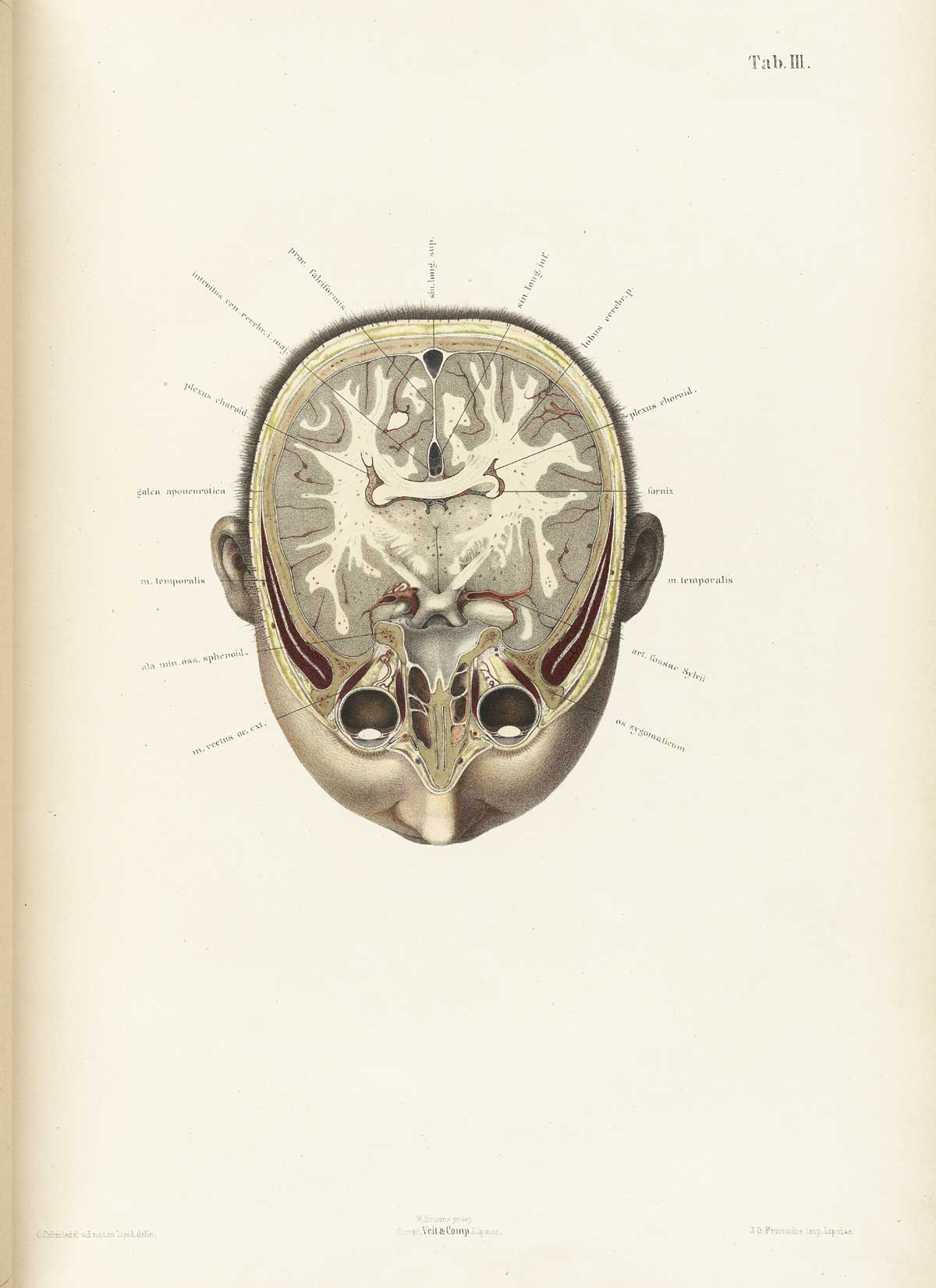
From Braune's Atlas of Topographical Anatomy

Christian Wilhelm Braune (17 July 1831 Leipzig – 29 April 1892) was a German anatomist. He is known for his excellent lithographs of cross-sections of the human body, and his pioneer work in biomechanics. He also pioneered the use of frozen cadavers for anatomical investigations.

== Biography ==
He studied at the universities of Göttingen and Würzburg. In 1872, he became professor of topographical anatomy at the University of Leipzig. Braune was inspired by the photographic work of French scientist Étienne-Jules Marey (1830–1904) involving anatomical movement. Marey believed that movement was the most important of all human functions, which he described graphically for biological research in Du mouvement dans les fonctions de la vie (1892) and Le Mouvement (1894). These works helped lead the way towards Braune's experimental, anatomical studies of the human gait, being published in the book Der Gang des Menschen (co-written with physiologist Otto Fischer 1861–1917). Braune's study of biomechanics of gait covered two transits of free walking and one transit of walking with a load. The methodology of gait analysis used by Braune is essentially the same used today.

With Otto Fischer, he conducted research involving the position of the center of gravity in the human body and its various segments. By first determining the planes of the "gravitational centers" of the longitudinal, sagittal and frontal axes of a frozen human cadaver in a given position, and then dissecting the cadaver with a saw, they were able to establish the center of gravity of the body and its component parts. Braune and Fischer also did extensive work on the fundamentals of resistive forces that the body's muscles need to overcome during movement.

In unrelated investigative work, Braune had a decisive role in the publication of the musical pieces composed by Frederick the Great of Prussia. Braune was son-in-law to German physician Ernst Heinrich Weber (1795–1878).

== Written works ==
- Das Venensystem des menschlichen Körper ("The venous system of the human body"), 1871.
- Topographisch-anatomischer Atlas nach Durchschnitten an gefrornen Cadavern, 1872; later translated into English as "An atlas of topographical anatomy : after plane sections of frozen bodies".
- Die Lage des Uterus und Fötus am Ende der Schwangerschaft nach Durchschnitten an gefrorenen Kadavern ("The situation of the uterus and foetus and the end of pregnancy according to cross sections of frozen cadavers"), 1873.
- Über den Schwerpunkt des menschlichen Körpers mit Rücksicht auf die Ausrüstung des deutschen Infanteristen, 1889; later translated into English as "On the centre of gravity of the human body as related to the equipment of the German infantry soldier".
- Bestimmung der Tragheitsmomente des menschlichen Körpers und seiner Glieder, 1892; later translated into English as "Determination of the moments of inertia of the human body and its limbs".
- Der gang des menschen (with Otto Fischer 1895-1904); later translated into English as "The human gait".

In collaboration with Wilhelm His, he edited, after 1876, the Archiv für Anatomie und Entwickelungsgeschichte (“Archive for Anatomy and Development”).
