= Charles Lowman =

American orthopedic surgeon

- Charles Lowman
- Born: Charles LeRoy Lowman; December 25, 1879; Park Ridge, Illinois, United States
- Died: April 17, 1977 (aged 97); Los Angeles, California, United States
- Occupation: Doctor
- Years active: 1908–1977
- Known for: Orthopedic surgery
- Relatives: Elizabeth Hudson Arnold Lowman (wife); Mary (wife)
- Medical career
- Research: Polio, Aquatic therapy, Orthopedics
- Awards: Presidential Medal of Freedom

Charles LeRoy Lowman (December 25, 1879 – April 17, 1977) was an American orthopedic surgeon, writer, founder of California's first orthopaedic hospital in Los Angeles, director of education and chief of staff emeritus. At that time, there was no orthopedic surgeon present in San Francisco and New Orleans, making him the only orthopaedist who served for seventy years during his lifetime career. In 1974, the U.S. president Richard Nixon conferred Presidential Medal of Freedom upon Lowman for his medical contribution to the United States.

== Life and background ==
Lowman was born in Park Ridge, Illinois on December 25, 1879. He did his graduation from the University of Southern California Medical School, and later he attended Massachusetts General Hospital and subsequently Boston Children's Hospital where he studied orthopedics and earned Doctor of Medicine degree. His family members were also physicians, including his paternal grandparents.

== Awards ==
Dr. Lowman was elected into the National Academy of Kinesiology (née American Academy of Physical Education) in 1974 as an Associate Fellow.

== Personal life ==
Lowman's first wife Elizabeth Hudson Arnold Lowman died in 1968, and later he married Mary in 1972. Lowman's daughter, Virginia Prince, was a well-known transgender activist.

== Career ==
During the early 1900s, Lowman worked at an ice manufacturer as a debt collector and the California Highway Commission as a secretary. He was initially working in California before moving to Los Angeles in 1900. Lowman started his medical career in 1908. He was the only orthopedist there for several years. After spending several years at Los Angeles medical institute, he held an outpatient clinic for handicapped patients from 1909 to 1972, and later moved to Calexico, California where he worked for children suffering from orthopedic diseases in a joint effort with the Valley Orthopedic Clinic that was also providing free treatments. Lowman served at USC Division of Biokinesiology and Physical Therapy as a medical director as well as orthopedic consultant to the Los Angeles Board of Education.

In 1927, he started providing education to physically challenged children at home as well as at medical institute with transportation service. Before doing so, he founded Orthopaedic Hospital, first hospital of southwest designed to facilitate treatments with such diseases for children. During the last years, he served as chief of staff emeritus, and later as director of education. Lowman was also working at a private clinic which he later limited and started providing treatments only to his old patients.

== Literary work ==
Lowman wrote eight books on orthopedic surgery that invented new surgery techniques, enabling polio victims to overcome the disease by practicing abdominal exercise to make the disabled parts move. He is also credited for contributing to aquatic therapy which he used for treating cerebral palsy and spastic patients.

== Death ==
Lowman was suffering from multiple ailments and died on April 17, 1977, in Los Angeles.
