= Rancho Los Amigos Scale =

Levels of Cognitive Functioning Scale

- Synonyms: Rancho Los Amigos Levels of Cognitive Functioning Scale
- Purpose: assess individuals after a closed head injury

The Rancho Los Amigos Scale (RLAS), a.k.a. the Rancho Los Amigos Levels of Cognitive Functioning Scale (LOCF) or Rancho Scale, is a medical scale used to assess individuals after a closed head injury, including traumatic brain injury, based on cognitive and behavioural presentations as they emerge from coma. It is named after the Rancho Los Amigos National Rehabilitation Center, located in Downey, California, United States in Los Angeles County.

After being assessed based on the LOCF, individuals with brain injury receive a score from one to eight. A score of one represents non-responsive cognitive functioning, whereas a score of eight represents purposeful and appropriate functioning.

Each of the eight levels represents the typical sequential progression of recovery from brain damage. However, individuals progress at different rates and may plateau at any stage of recovery. These patients are scored based on combinations of the following criteria:

- responsiveness to stimuli
- ability to follow commands
- presence of non-purposeful behavior
- cooperation
- confusion
- attention to environment
- focus
- coherence of verbalization
- appropriateness of verbalizations and actions
- memory recall
- orientation
- judgement and reasoning

LOCF scores are used by health care professionals for standardized communication about patient status and can be used by physiatrists, physical therapists, occupational therapists, recreational therapists, and speech language pathologists as the basis for treatment planning.

This eight-level scale was found to possess test-retest and interrater reliability as well as concurrent and predictive validity. It is widely used clinically and is often paired with the Glasgow Coma Scale in health care facilities.
