= Pierre Stagnara =

French spinal surgeon

- Born: 16 January 1917
- Died: 1 July 1995 (aged 78)
- Occupation: French spinal surgeon

Pierre Stagnara (January 16, 1917 – July 1, 1995) was a French spinal surgeon. He has been described as a "pioneer" in the study of spinal deformities, "one of the greatest figures of French spinal surgery." Stagnara was born in January 16, 1917 in Loriol-sur-Drôme, France. He studied medicine in the city of Lyon. During World War II he was drafted into the French army. After the war, he worked in a variety of hospitals throughout Lyon. In 1959 he became the Chief of the Centre des Massues and served in this position until his retirement in 1982. Whilst working at the institution he pioneered many orthopedic techniques. Including the non-surgical management of scoliosis.

Stagnara created the Lyon brace, also known as the Stagnara brace in 1947. It was initially made from leather and steel, although it was modified in 1985 to be constructed from joints and a faceplate made of steel, radio-transparent duralumin bars, and poly(methyl methacrylate) shells. Stagnara is also responsible for the creation of the Lyon method of surgical treatment.

He invented the Stagnara wake-up test. It was used to identify potential spinal cord complications resulting from spinal surgery. The test involved waking up a patient who had been placed under anesthesia following the completion of the main part of the surgery to monitor their foot movement. This was designed to determine if their spinal cord had remained completely functional. Following the completion of the test, the patient will be placed under anesthesia once more. This technique was used from the 1970s-1990s before the development of spinal cord monitoring. During this period, it was the only reliable way of determining spinal cord functioning during a spinal surgery. However, it was only able to be used once during surgery, it took a significant amount of time to accomplish the procedure, and it could result in severe side effects such as accidental extubation. Techniques such as somatosensory evoked potential or motor evoked potential have largely replaced the Stagnara wake-up test. It may be used in certain cases if other monitoring methods are not effective in these scenarios. The test may also be used along with other monitoring techniques.

Stagnara utilized the halo device, invented in the 1960s by doctors at Riancho Los Amigos Hospital, to develop Halo-gravity traction in 1971. This method of treating severe spinal deformities has since become one of the most popular treatments for spinal issues. In 1982 he helped found the European Spinal Deformity Society. Stagnara served as the president of the society in the same year. In 1985 he authored a book on spinal deformities entitled Les Déformations du rachis: scolioses, cyphoses, lordoses.

Stagnara married a woman named Denise Locard in 1942. He had 10 children with her and had 31 grandchildren over the course of his life. Together, they founded the Sésame group in 1966. This group was devoted to promoting sex education throughout France. Stagnara retired in 1982. During his retirement, he cultivated vineyards and coauthored a book with his wife entitled Faithful Love - Utopia or Reality? He died on July 1, 1995.
