= Halo-gravity traction device =

Device used to treat spinal deformities

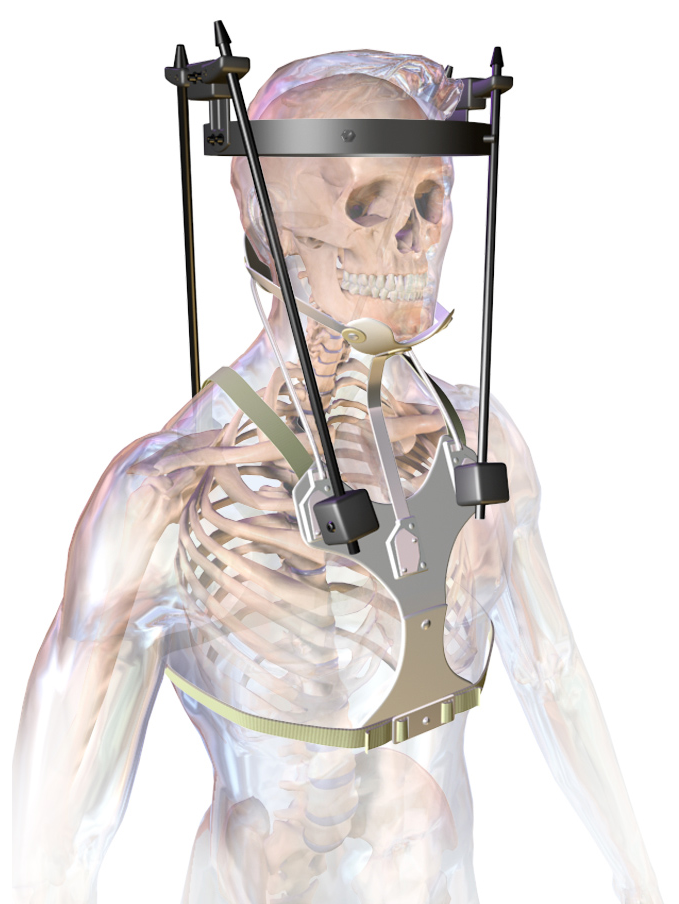
- Illustration of a halo brace
- Specialty: Orthopedics

Halo-gravity traction (HGT) is a type of traction device utilized to treat spinal deformities such as scoliosis, congenital spine deformities, cervical instability, basilar invagination, and kyphosis. It is used prior to surgical treatment to reduce the difficulty of the following surgery and the need for a more dangerous surgery. The device works by applying weight to the spine in order to stretch and straighten it. Patients are capable of remaining somewhat active using a wheelchair or a walker while undergoing treatment. Most of the research suggests that HGT is a safe treatment, and it can even improve patients' nutrition or respiratory functioning. However, some patients may experience side effects such as headaches or neurological complications. The halo device itself was invented in the 1960s by doctors working at the Rancho Los Amigos hospital. Their work was published in a paper entitled "The Halo: A Spinal Skeletal Traction Fixation Device." The clinician Pierre Stagnara utilized the device to develop Halo-Gravity traction.

== Technique ==
Halo-gravity traction works by straightening and stretching the compressed spine. It relies on the viscoelastic properties of vertebrae. This means vertebrae can stretch over time. Doctors will apply weight to the spine, and gradually increase it over time, slowly straightening and stretching it. Patients undergoing the procedure will typically spend the entire course of the treatment, which is usually three to eight weeks, in a hospital. Usually, halo-gravity traction is the first step in the treatment plan for a child with severe spinal deformity. Following the procedure, it is common for a surgical operation such as spinal fusion surgery to be performed afterward to permanently mend the issue. It is utilized before the operation to reduce the need for a more dangerous surgery and to reduce the risk of damage to the soft tissues or nerves that surround the spine during the surgery. In addition, HGT has also been found to reduce the risk of complications during the following surgery.

To perform halo-traction therapy a surgeon will use six to ten small pins to attach a "halo" made of a metal ring to the patient's skull. Doctors will typically leave one to two centimeters of distance between the halo and the patient's head. It is common for older patients to be given eight pins while younger patients are given 10. Prior to pin placement, some patients may undergo hair removal. It is not required for successful treatment, but it can help to reduce the risk of pin infection from hair getting caught in a pin or scalp necrosis. The pins will be placed into the forehead bones to prevent the head from moving. Pin placement is determined using a CT scan. The chosen area will be cleaned with betadine swabs. Usually, two to three pins are placed in the frontal and occipital areas. Pins placed on the occipital area will have to be placed one centimeter above and behind the auricle of the ear. Pins placed on the anterior of the head will likely be placed one centimeter above and to the sides of the eyebrow to avert potential damage to the supraorbital and the supratrochlear nerves, and potential muscle damage. Parietal placements are generally avoided as the skull around this area is generally softer, which risks the pins puncturing the temporal artery. Typically, the pins will tightened to a torque equivalent to the age of the child using a torque wrench. Adults can withstand tighter torques than children can. While this operation is being performed the child will be given general anesthesia. In infant children, significantly less torque is required to tighten the pins. This allows for the pins to be placed in more areas than they could be placed in older patients.

Afterward, the halo will be attached to a pulley system which is attached to the patient's bed, walker, or wheelchair. Spring-type pulleys are typically used as they allow for the patient to self-regulate the weight applied to the pulley, which improves the safety of the device. Spring-based HGT devices are also cheaper and easier to build than other methods of construction. It is common for patients to begin the procedure with 5-10 pounds of weight on the pulley system. Over the next few weeks, clinicians will add weight to the pulley, which will slowly straighten the patient's spine over time. Eventually, a weight greater than 50% of the patient's body weight may be achieved. Doctors will monitor the movements and strength and will take x-rays of the patient to track their progress. They will adjust the amount of weight on the pulley system based on the results. All patients will undergo cranial nerve testing during the procedure. After the spine has reached its optimal position, spinal fusion surgery will be performed on the patient.

While undergoing the procedure, patients are encouraged to remain as active as possible. Activities such as low-impact play, walking, or standing can all increase the benefits of halo-traction therapy. However, patients are limited to leaving the traction for only a short time span. They can leave for activities such as repositioning, changing clothes, daily medical care, showering, or using the toilet. Baby shampoo is required to be used for bathing purposes as other shampoos could contain chemicals that react negatively with the metal halo. Patients will be required to utilize a special bed for sleeping while in the traction. After ending treatment the patient is required to avoid strenuous activities for a few months as their spine and muscles will still need to recover. Some patients may wear an orthopedic vest or a halo vest.

== Side effects ==
Halo-gravity traction has been found to be almost completely safe. Patients who have undergone the procedure report that they have a greater ability to stand upright, an increased appetite, and an improved body image. It can improve respiratory functioning by relieving pressure on the lungs caused by a deformed spine. Patients often gain weight and have improved nutrition following HGT. This may occur since HGT can correct issues associated with spinal deformities, such as exercise, comorbid metabolic disorders, and gastrointestinal malformations. These issues are associated with malnutrition and low weight, and HGT can lead to weight gain by correcting them. When in combination with surgical release, HGT may improve the flexibility of the spine and lead to more spinal correction.

Patients may experience pain from the pins, which is usually caused by the loosening of the pins. This can be remedied by tightening them. Up to 20% of patients may experience infections at the site where the pins were applied. These infections are typically treated with antibiotics. One rare, but serious complication of the procedure can be the development of intra-cranial abscesses due to septic contamination of the pin site. Some patients experience headaches around the area where the pins were applied for a short while after the halo is attached. It is common for patients to recover from this pain in less than 24 hours. Halo therapy will leave small lesions in the skin when the pins are first removed. Typically, they will turn into scabs after a few days. Patients who have undergone the procedure will also have small scars on their foreheads. These scars will typically fade over time.

If the traction that is applied is greater than the tolerable amount, the patient may feel cervical pain, cranial nerve lesions, nausea, vertigo, or dizziness. These side effects are treated by lowering the level of weight applied. Some patients may suffer from motor paresis after the application of the device. Typically it is present in patients with preexisting spinal cord abnormalities. Generally, HGT does not cause neurological side effects due to the slow progression of traction. The spine adjusts slowly over time, and as a result, consequences are generally limited. Children are less likely than adolescents or adults to experience neurological side effects, due to the softness and flexibility of their spine, as well as their low weight.

Erb's palsy has been identified as a rare neurological side effect of HGT. One 2006 study published in the journal "Studies in Health Technology and Informatics" found that in extremely rare cases HGT could induce Erb's palsy, ulnar nerve paralysis, and median nerve palsy in cases. In the seven cases identified by the study, all patients had fully recovered within a few months of treatment. The likelihood of developing Erb's palsy due to HGT is associated with the weight of the traction. Another study published in the Journal of Spinal Disorders & Techniques found that patients may experience Erb's palsy or sensory loss during or after treatment. However, none of the patients who had experienced these side effects reported in this study had permanent neurological loss.

One 2016 clinical study published in BioMed Research International found that HGT resulted in reduced bone density among patients with kyphoscoliosis. However, little other research has investigated this potential side effect or found any evidence to support this claim.

Patients with bone conditions such as fibrous dysplasia or osteogenesis imperfecta may be unsuitable for treatment if the pins are not capable of safely being applied to the bone. Osteoporosis is considered a contraindication that sometimes may prevent treatment, however, doctors may avert complications by utilizing more pins with a lower torque. Absolute contraindications for halo-gravity traction include the presence of a stenotic segment, an intradural or extradural lesion, lesions in the skull by the sites of pin application, any lesion or tumor by the spine cord, severe skull deformity, and spine instability.

== Effectiveness ==
Most of the research conducted on HGT found that it is mostly a safe, reliable, and effective treatment. The average correction rate of HGT has been shown to be 19.4% for sagittal curves and 24.1% coronal curvature. One 2013 study on 33 patients published in the journal Spine Deformity found an average correction rate of 33% for coronal curves and 35% for sagittal. According to a cohort study conducted on 75 subjects investigating the efficacy of Halo traction therapy found an improvement rate of 31% to 66% for the spine. They found a coronal curvature improvement of 19.6% for adolescents, and 12% for adults. Kyphosis had improved at a rate of 23.9% for adolescents. Afterward, spinal surgery performed on people who had undergone the procedure had a greater than 50% chance of success.

One study conducted on 20 patients with either scoliosis, kyphosis, or kyphoscoliosis found that the most improvement occurred within the first 3 weeks of treatment. According to this study, the spinal curve had improved by 63.7% during the first two weeks, which decreased to 24.3% at 3 weeks, and to 15.9% at 4 weeks. Other studies have found similar results. One study conducted on 21 patients found that 45% of improvement occurred within the first 3 weeks. Another study on 24 patients found that a mean improvement of 82% occurred during the first three weeks.

Much of the research utilized as evidence of the efficacy of HGT has been criticized for a lack of a control group and a small sample size. Some research has suggested that HGT leads to statistically insignificant improvement. Paul Sponseller, an Orthopedic surgeon at Johns Hopkins University, claims in his study "The use of traction in the treatment of severe spinal deformity" that his research found "no statistically significant difference in main coronal curve correction (62% vs. 59%), operative time, blood loss, and total complication rate (27% vs. 52%)." However, his data did showcase that people who had not undergone HGT required surgical resection 30% more often. In a study on 25 patients with severe spinal deformities who had been treated with spinal surgery, a mean correction of 44 degrees was found in patients who had not undergone HGT prior to the operation, and a mean correction of 52 was found in patients who had been treated with HGT. The researchers concluded that this difference was not statistically significant, and therefore HGT should not be used as the general treatment for these issues, and should be reserved for specific cases.

Some research suggests that HGT may be less effective than other forms of traction, such as Halo-femoral traction or Halo-pelvic traction. HGT also has been found to require lengthy hospital stays, which many patients dislike about the treatment. In the study by Paul Sponsellor, he found that patients who had undergone HGT spent almost twice the amount of time hospitalized as those who had not received the treatment. HGT is significantly safer than other forms of traction. It is less likely to produce significant complications such as blood loss, neurological side effects, and spine stiffness or degeneration. HGT also allows patients to remain social and active, whilst other forms of traction severely restrict movement. These factors have led to HGT becoming the standard preoperative treatment for patients with severe spinal deformities.
