= Biometric points =

In order to identify a person, a security system has to compare personal characteristics with a database. A scan of a person's iris, fingerprint, face, or other distinguishing feature is created, and a series of biometric points are drawn at key locations in the scan. For example, in the case of a facial scan, biometric points might be placed at the tip of each ear lobe and in the corners of both eyes. Measurements taken between all the (possibly hundreds of) points of a scan are compiled and result in a numerical "score" (which can be quite large). This score is unique for every individual, but it can quickly and easily be compared to any compiled scores of the facial scans in the database to determine if there is a match.

== Basic approach ==
For security systems using cameras, people recognition has become, in recent years, one of the most common forms of identification. The successful identification of an individual requires comparing an image of the individual to a database that contains the images of many people. However, comparing each image in its entirety, pixel by pixel, would be an extremely slow and expensive process. To solve this problem, biometrics are used. With biometrics, rather than comparing the entire image, biometric points are placed at key locations, measurements are taken between all the points, and the results are compiled into a "score." A score can be easily obtained from every image on file and stored in the database. When a new individual's image is obtained, the only requirement for successful identification is that the system needs to compile the score based on the image's biometrics and then to compare this new score to the scores in the database—an easy task for a modern computer or laptop.

The goal of a recognition system: given an image of an "unknown" person, to find a picture of the same person in a group of "known" or training images. The difficulty is ensuring that this process can be performed in real time. A biometric system identifies images or videos of people automatically. It can operate in two modes:

- Verification or authentication of individuals: a person's current image is compared with a stored image of the person to be identified. The system confirms or denies the identity of the person.
- ID or person recognition: the image of a stranger is compared with the images of known persons in the database to determine identity.

== Biometrics ==
For the scientist, biometrics is the science of measuring physical properties of living beings and for the engineer it is the automated recognition of individuals based on their behavioural and biological characteristics.

By measuring an individual's suitable behavioural and biological characteristics in a recognition inquiry and comparing these data with the biometric reference data, which had been stored during a learning procedure, the identity of a specific user is determined.

=== Biometric characteristic ===
A biometric characteristic is biological or behavioural property of an individual that can be measured and from which distinguishing, repeatable biometric features can be extracted for the purpose of automated recognition of individuals. An example is the face.

This characteristic, recorded with a capture device, can be compared with a biometric sample representation of biometric characteristics.

The biometric features are information extracted from biometric samples, which can be used for comparison with a biometric reference. Examples are characteristic measurements extracted from a photograph of a face, such as eye distance or nose size.

The aim of the extraction of biometric features from a biometric sample is to remove any information that does not contribute to biometric recognition. This enables a fast comparison, improved biometric performance, and may have privacy advantages.

=== Well-known biometric characteristics ===
Biometric characteristic	Description of the features
Fingerprint	Finger lines, pore structure
Signature (dynamic)	Writing with pressure and speed differentials
Facial geometry	Distances between specific facial features (eyes, nose, mouth)
Iris	Iris pattern
Retina	Eye background (pattern of retina blood vessels)
Body geometry	Distance between specific body features
Hand geometry	Measurement of fingers and palm
Vein structure of hand	Vein structure of the back or palm of the hand
Ear form	Dimensions of the visible ear
Voice	Tone or timbre
DNA	DNA code as the carrier of human heredity
Keyboard strokes	Rhythm of keyboard strokes (PC or other keyboard)
Gait Analysis	Variations in gait style or binary gait silhouette sequences
Touch screen (dynamic)	Interaction with touchscreens and swipe gestures

== Process ==
To be able to recognize a person by biometric characteristics and derived biometric features, a learning phase must first take place.

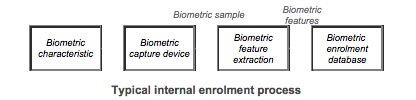
Enrolment process

The procedure is called enrollment and comprises the creation of an enrollment data record of the biometric data subject (the person to be enrolled) and its storage in a biometric enrollment database. The enrollment data record comprises one or multiple biometric references and arbitrary non-biometric data such as a name or a personnel number.

=== Biometric recognition work ===
For the purpose of recognition, the biometric data subject (the person to be recognized) presents his or her biometric characteristics to the biometric capture device, which generates a recognition biometric sample.

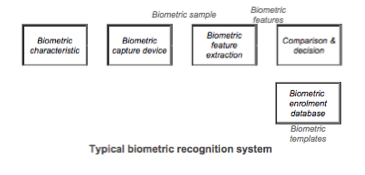
Decision process before an image is received

From this recognition biometric sample the biometric feature extraction software creates biometric features which are compared with one or multiple biometric templates from the biometric enrollment database. Due to the statistical nature of biometric samples there is generally no exact match possible. For that reason, the decision process will only assign the biometric data subject to a biometric template and confirm recognition if the comparison score exceeds an adjustable threshold.

=== Biometric points or shapes ===
In order to make an accurate comparison and determine if there is a match, the system requires a shape or points measurement to be compared against the information in the database. This process must be discriminating, quick to compute, concise to store, pose-independent and efficient to match.

==== Head ====
The head shape is based in a spherical harmonics; the human head grid is mapped into a sphere and then expanded in the basics or spherical harmonics. For face recognition, the relationship between various points, such as the distance between the eyes, is compared.

==== Body ====
For the body different kind of points are used, but, as with the head, the distances between these points are measured. Seventy-three so-called anthropometry landmarks were extracted from the scans of a database used to create this system. These are point-to-point distances. The landmarks identify key bone joint structure and are adequate to segment the body and produce anatomical reference axis systems for the key body segments and joints. Those points with separations that are pose-independent and feasibly findable in a camera’s field of view are connected by a single large bone. They form a biometric vector of twelve distances, $d$, with $P1$, wrist to elbow, $P2$ elbow to shoulder, d3 hip to knee, etc. for which the Euclidean distance $d = | | Pi - Pj | |$ is invariant across different poses. Distances such as chin-knee are avoided. All measurements are in millimeters (mm).

== Error ==
A computer-vision-based system will contain some errors in measurement of the landmark points. This is a complex function of the imaging system, image post-processing, and 3D calculation algorithm. For simplicity, the system does not analyze this process but instead specifies an equivalent error at the position of the landmarks, and studies the effect of this error on the recognizer.

== Conclusion ==
Biometrics points are useful for making identifications with cameras systems, but they depend on the existence of a previously generated database so that distances can be compared.

== Applications ==
Beside the most common use for people recognition in security systems, they can be used in Kinect for parental control. For example, the new data obtained is compared with previously stored data to determine if the person recognized is a minor or not.
