= Judith M. Burnfield =

American women academics

Judith M. "Judy" Burnfield is the director of the Institute for Rehabilitative Science and Engineering, director of the Movement and Neurosciences Center, and the Clifton Chair in Physical Therapy and Movement Sciences at Madonna Rehabilitation Hospital in Lincoln, Nebraska.

Burnfield earned her Doctor of Philosophy degree from the University of Southern California and completed her postdoctoral training at the Pathokinesiology Laboratory at Rancho Los Amigos National Rehabilitation Center. She was appointed director of the newly designed Athletic Performance Laboratory at the University of Nebraska–Lincoln from 2013 to 2015.
