= Hand geometry =

Biometric identification

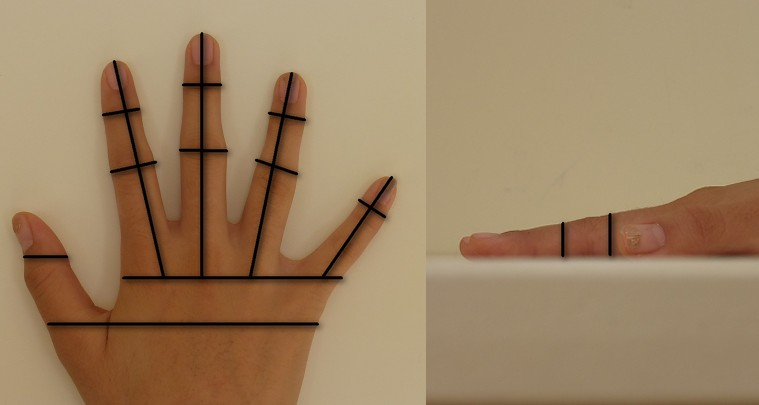
Geometry of a hand and some examples of measurements that can be taken by hand geometry reading devices.

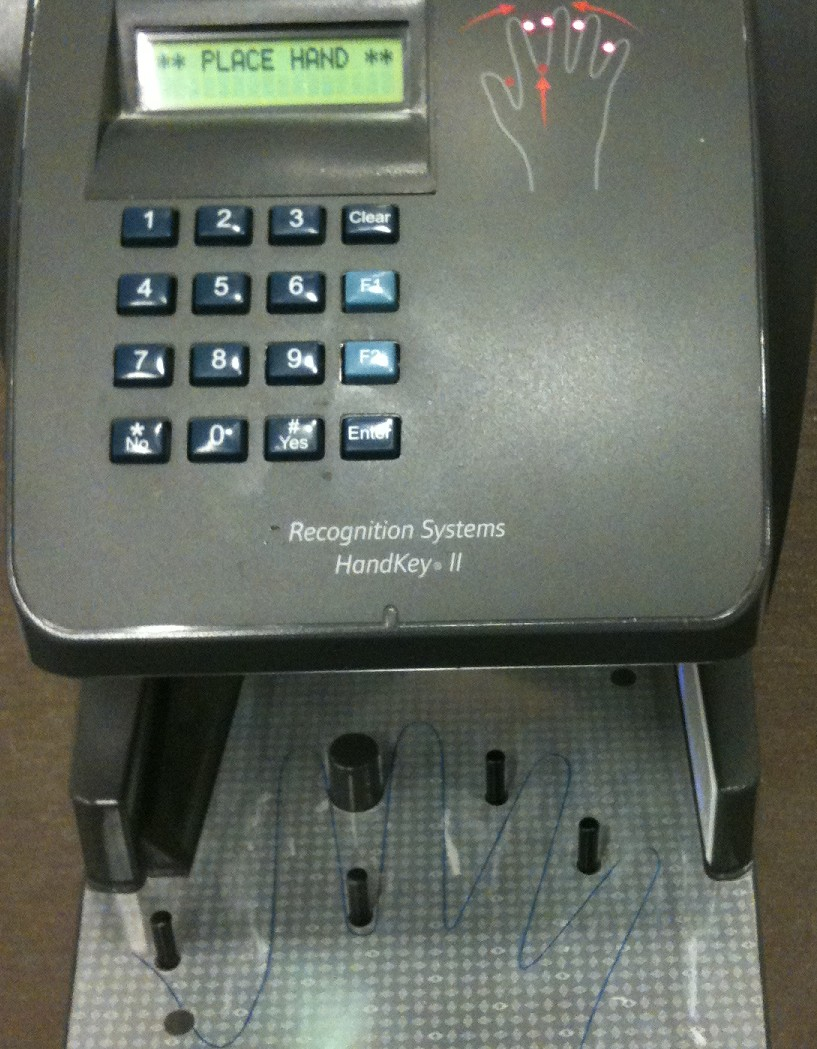
A hand geometry reading device with pegs to control the placement of the hand. Angled mirror on the left reflects the side view image of the hand to the camera. A CCD camera is beneath the keypad to take the top view image of the hand and the mirror image.

Hand geometry is a biometric that identifies users from the shape of their hands. Hand geometry readers measure a user's palm and fingers along many dimensions including length, width, deviation, and angle and compare those measurements to measurements stored in a file.

== History ==
Viable hand geometry devices have been manufactured since the early 1970s, making hand geometry the first biometric to find widespread computerized use. Robert Miller realized the distinctive features of hand sizes and shapes could be used for identification and patented the first automated hand geometry device at the Stanford Research Institute in 1971. The device would measure the hand, and the numbers needed to match the punched holes of a user ID card to activate the circuit to be identified. David Sidlauskas was also a major player in the hand geometry device production, and he patented Handkey ID3D, the first hand scanner that worked in 3D that involved an optical measuring plate, camera, and numeric keypad to enter a personal PIN. In the academic literature, one of the earliest papers on the topic of hand geometry was by Jain et al., where the authors designed a prototype hand geometry system that uses 16 geometric features for identity verification.

== As an add-on ==
Hand geometry is not thought to be as unique as fingerprints, palm veins or irises. Fingerprinting and iris recognition remain the preferred technology for high-security applications. In large populations, hand geometry is not suitable for so-called one-to-many applications, in which a user is identified from his biometric without any other identification. However, hand geometry is very reliable when combined with other forms of identification, such as identification cards or personal identification numbers. There have also been proposed methods to include hand-geometry with palm print-based verification for better accuracy and performance.

== Commercial use ==
There have been many patents issued for devices that measure hand geometry from the U.S. patent office.

A hand-geometry system‚ Identimat, was used at Shearson Hamil on Wall Street to track attendance, marking the beginning of biometric technology usage. Based on Robert Miller's patent, Identimat utilized light sensing cells to measure finger length and a magnetic strip card reader to verify identification cards and compared the information given to determine the authorization of the person. Although production ceased in 1987, the idea remains popular; common applications include access control and time-and-attendance operations.

== Advantages ==
Although hand geometry is not considered to be the most secure compared to other biometric points, there are some advantages to this method. This includes:

- Medium cost
- Fast results due to low-computational cost algorithms
- Reduced template size so takes up less storage
- Easy to use

== Disadvantages ==
Although the performance of these systems is not shown to be influenced by factors such as dry skin, large rings and swelling in the fingers may pose problems.

They are not universally accessible, as they cannot be used by those with paralysis or Parkinson's disease, and they can be deceived using high-quality bone structure models.

== Pay-by-hand ==
Hand-recognition payment, also named pay-by-hand is a payment method that uses the scanning of one's hand. It is an alternative payment system to using credit cards. The technology uses biometric identification by scanning the client's hand and reading various features like the position of veins and bones and it was tested by Amazon since 2019.

== See also ==
- Biometrics in schools
- Biometric technology in access control
- INSPASS
