= Rancho Los Amigos National Rehabilitation Center =

Coordinates: 33.929358°N 118.158588°W

- Los Angeles County Department of Health Services

Geography
- Location: 7601 East Imperial Highway, Downey, California, United States

Organization
- Care system: Public
- Type: Specialist
- Affiliated university: USC

Services
- Emergency department: None
- Beds: 395
- Speciality: Rehabilitation hospital

History
- Founded: 1888

Links
- Website: www.rancho.org
- Lists: Hospitals in California

Rancho Los Amigos National Rehabilitation Center is a rehabilitation hospital located in Downey, California, United States. Its name in Spanish means "Friends' Ranch".

== History ==
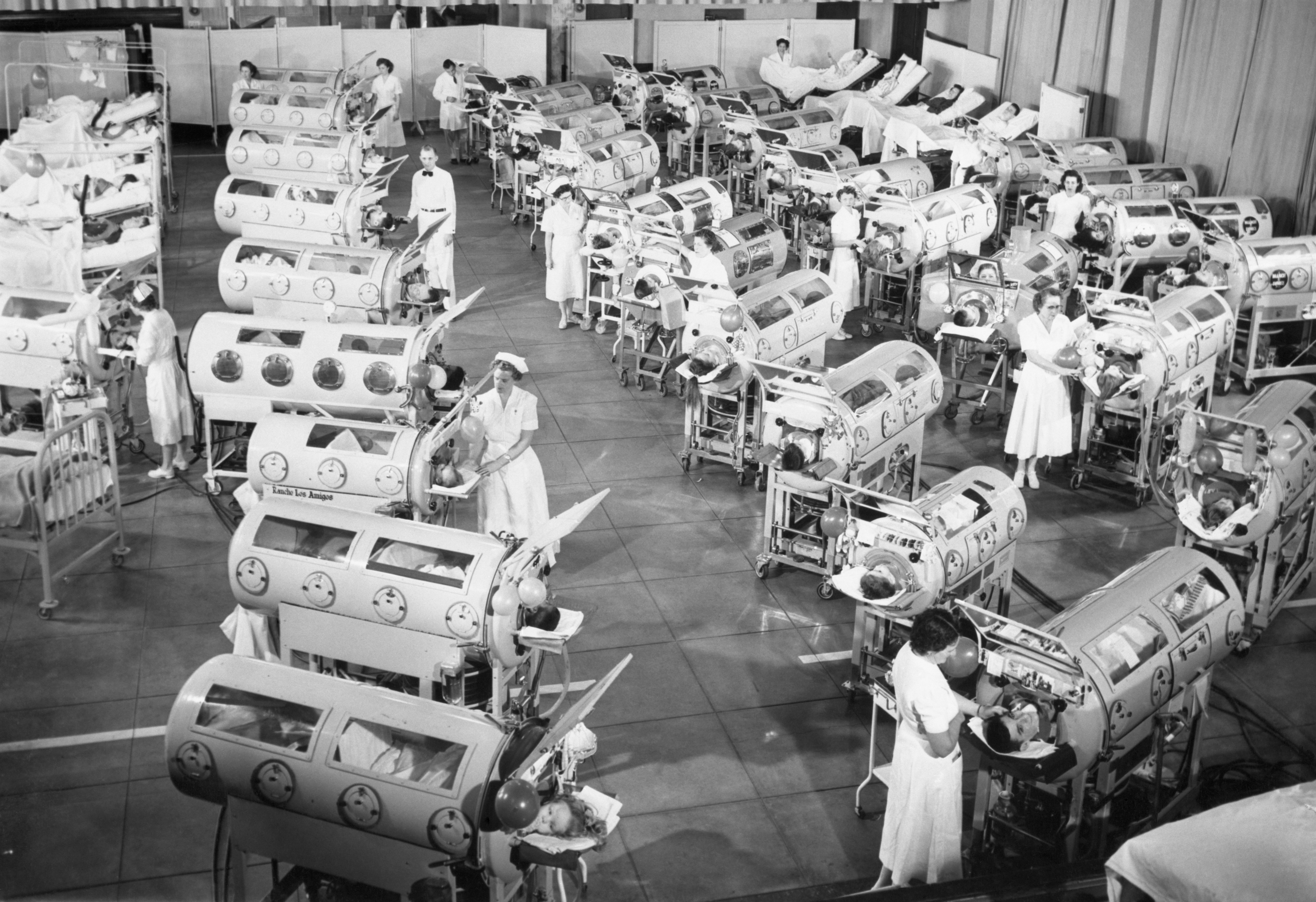
The hospital's polio ward, circa 1953

=== Overview ===
Rancho Los Amigos National Rehabilitation Center, or Rancho, dates back to 1888 when indigent patients from the Los Angeles County Hospital were relocated to what was then known as the Los Angeles County Poor Farm. Physical Therapy and Occupational Therapy were started in the late 1920s. The Rancho rapidly expanded after it was designated as a respiratory center for polio patients in 1951. In 1955, Dr. Vernon L. Nickel developed the halo vest, a device which is still in use to immobilize the cervical spine following severe neck injury or certain types of surgery. Drs. Jacquelin Perry and Robert Waters contributed to advances in pathokinesiology and treatment of spinal cord injuries, and other advances in rehabilitation of orthopedic and neurologic disorders were made in ensuing years. The Rancho Los Amigos Scale, a widely used scale to determine the cognitive level in brain-injured patients, was developed in the 1970s.

The Center was featured in Visiting... with Huell Howser Episode 419.

=== 1887-1907 ===
In 1887, Rancho Los Amigos was established under the original name "The County Poor Farm" originally purposed to provide work, housing, and medical care to the poor. The buildings constructed during this time on the 124.4 acre property were designed by local architect Jacob Friedlander and the architectural firm Kysor, Morgan, and Walls, known for their work on buildings in Los Angeles such as the Pico House and USC's Widney Hall. During this period the oldest building still standing on the south campus, the aviary, was constructed as well as the male and female wards and the refectory. When the facility opened in December 1888 Edwin L. Burdick was appointed as the first superintendent and resident physician. However; In 1901 Burdick resigned due to health issues and his role was divided to T.F. Simpson, who became superintendent, and Dr. F.L. Norton, who became the resident physician. Despite initially positive comments in 1902 by the General Federation of Women's clubs, praising the farm's mix of "charity and industry..", by 1903 concerns over the farm's overcrowding and lack of sanitation reached newspapers. Problems that would persist until remodeling in 1906 under superintendent George S. Clark, who replaced Simpson in 1903.

=== 1907-1915 ===
In 1907, Clark was replaced as superintendent by Donald Chick, who despite only being superintendent for 9 months established many of the poor farms important facilities such as the first chapel and psychiatric ward, the first building explicitly build for medical purposes. Despite the original wards being gendered, the psychiatric ward housed both men and women. Chick was replaced by Andrew Wade who brought significant growth to the farm and also became the facilities first postmaster. Under Wade the facility grew to 333 acres and received employee housing and its first power house, built in 1909. By 1910 the facility had begun shifting to its role as a medical facility due to a large influx in residents with chronic medical disorders. A year later Charles C. Manning replaced Wade and increased the farm's population by 280% to 479 residents. Manning constructed multiple new wards to accommodate the increased population and was briefly replaced in 1915 by Carl P. Talle.

=== 1915-1952 ===
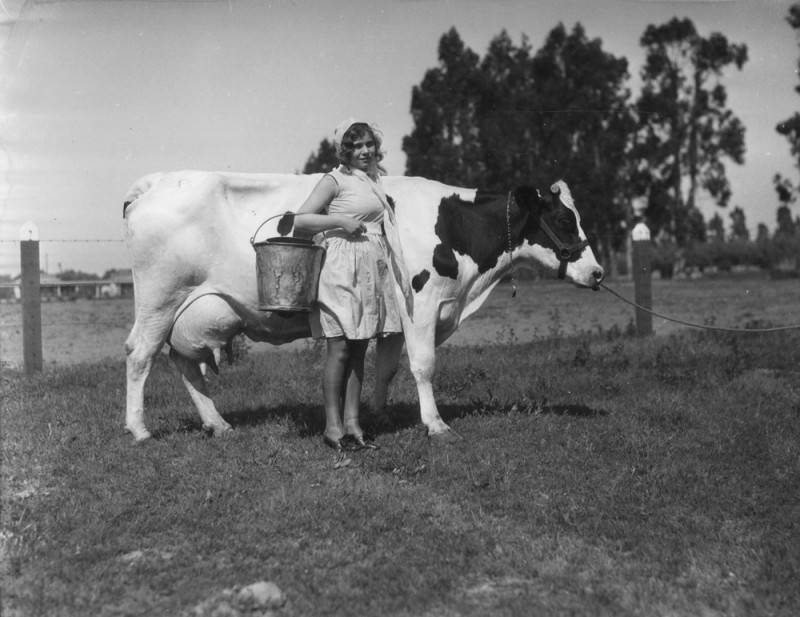
A young woman poses with a bucket of milk next to a milk cow at the Los Angeles County Farm in Downey, date unknown

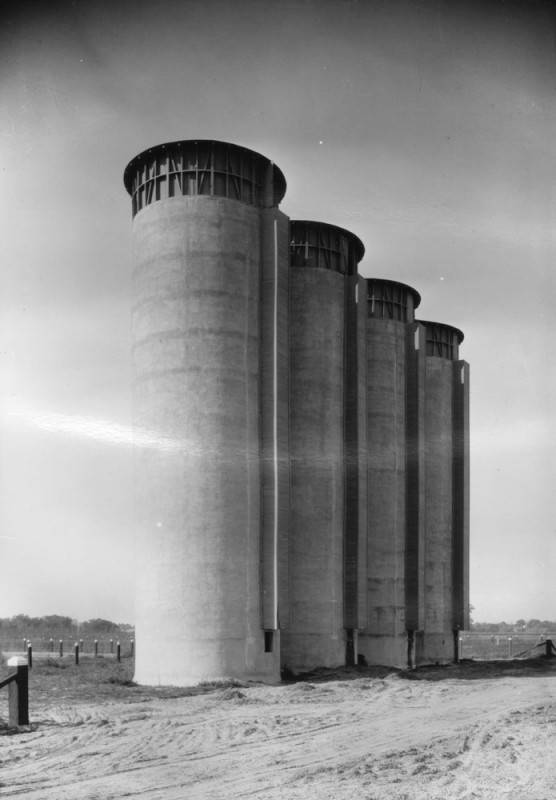
A row of grain storage silos at the Los Angeles County Farm in Downey, c. 1930

In 1915 superintendent William Ruddy Harriman was appointed and remained superintendent until 1952. Under Harriman much of the farm was rebuilt following a flood in 1914 which brought with it significant improvements including new buildings and an irrigation system. A multitude of new wards were also constructed to accommodate the rising number of mentally ill patients. By 1922 the facility had fully transitioned from a poor farm to a medical facility although farming operations would continue on the grounds for a number of years after. In 1926 the facility's occupational therapy program, which focused on rehabilitation through actions, was established and through it patients learned various crafts and made much the hospital's of the furniture, food, and other necessities. In 1928 the auditorium was created in the place of the refectory. By the end of the 1920s the facility had grown to 540 acres. Following the stock market crash in 1929 the hospital received a cut in funding and an increase in residents. Despite the setbacks of the Great Depression the facility continued to expand and be upgraded including the 1933 addition of the first modern medical building, the Harriman building. During this time the facility officially had its name changed from "The County Poor Farm" to "Rancho Los Amigos", which it is still known as today, to better reflect its position as a medical facility. In 1933 the Long Beach earthquake brought with it more rebuilding and more improvements. In 1935 The National Social Security Act enabled many older residents to leave Rancho Los Amigos which made room for many mentally ill children to be admitted in. Due to many residents being unable to work this brought upon the end of Rancho Los Amigo's farming operations. after World War 2 the facility's population doubled partially due to the 1944 polio outbreak. Rancho Los Amigos became known for its polio care and in 1950 general ward 50 was remodeled to treat polio patients specifically. In 1952 superintendent Harriman retired and was replaced by Robert Thomas.

=== 1952-present ===
In 1952 Thomas had the respiratory center constructed on the northern campus and had the staff reorganized into the professional service department, nursing department, and dietary department. During this time home care, orthopedic, rehabilitation, and social services departments were also added. After Thomas's departure in 1956 Ranch Los Amigos continued to grow in the northern campus throughout the 20th century leaving the southern campus vacated by 1988.

=== Demolition of Historic South Campus ===
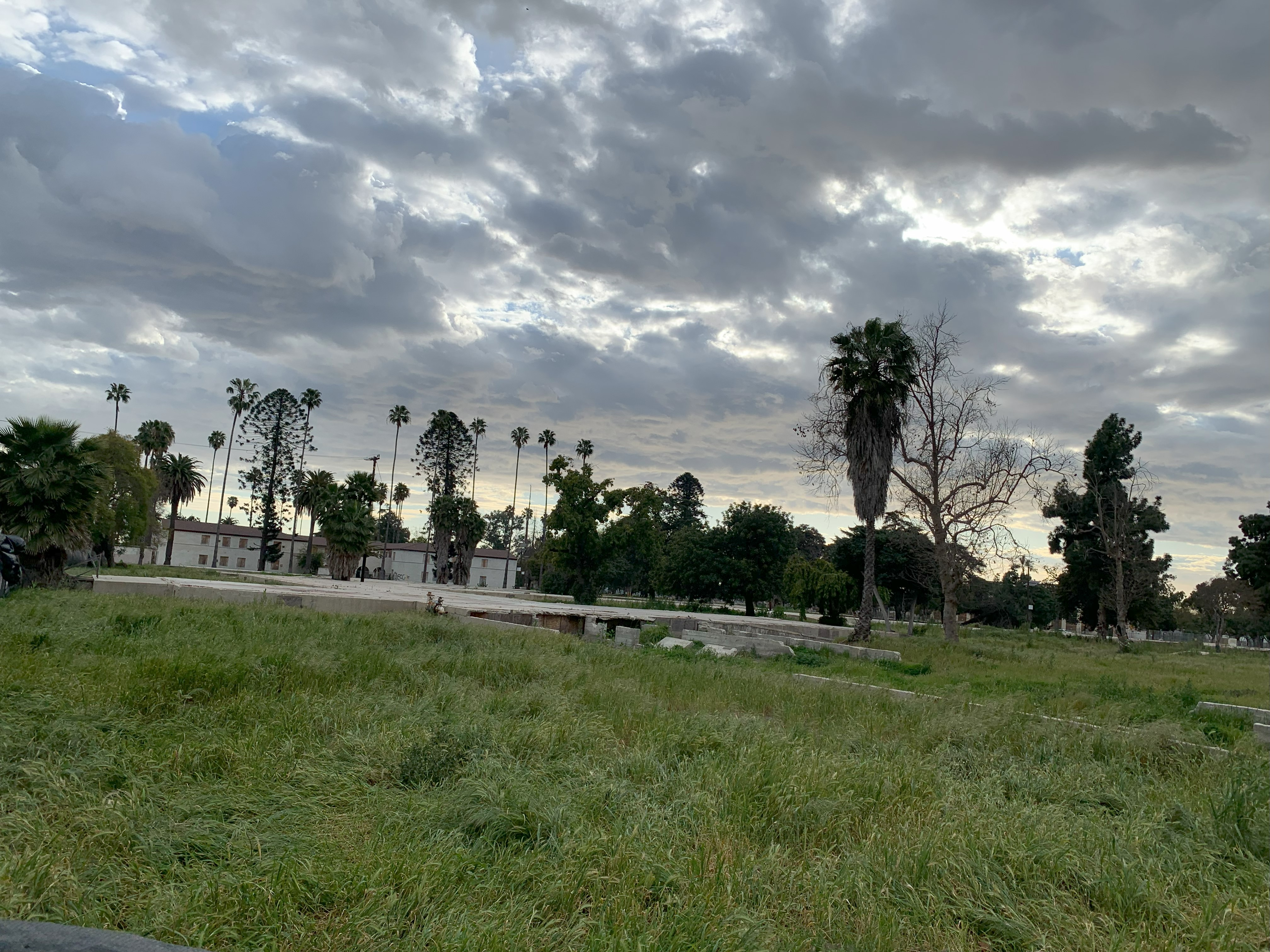
All that remains of the Southern campus as of March 2024

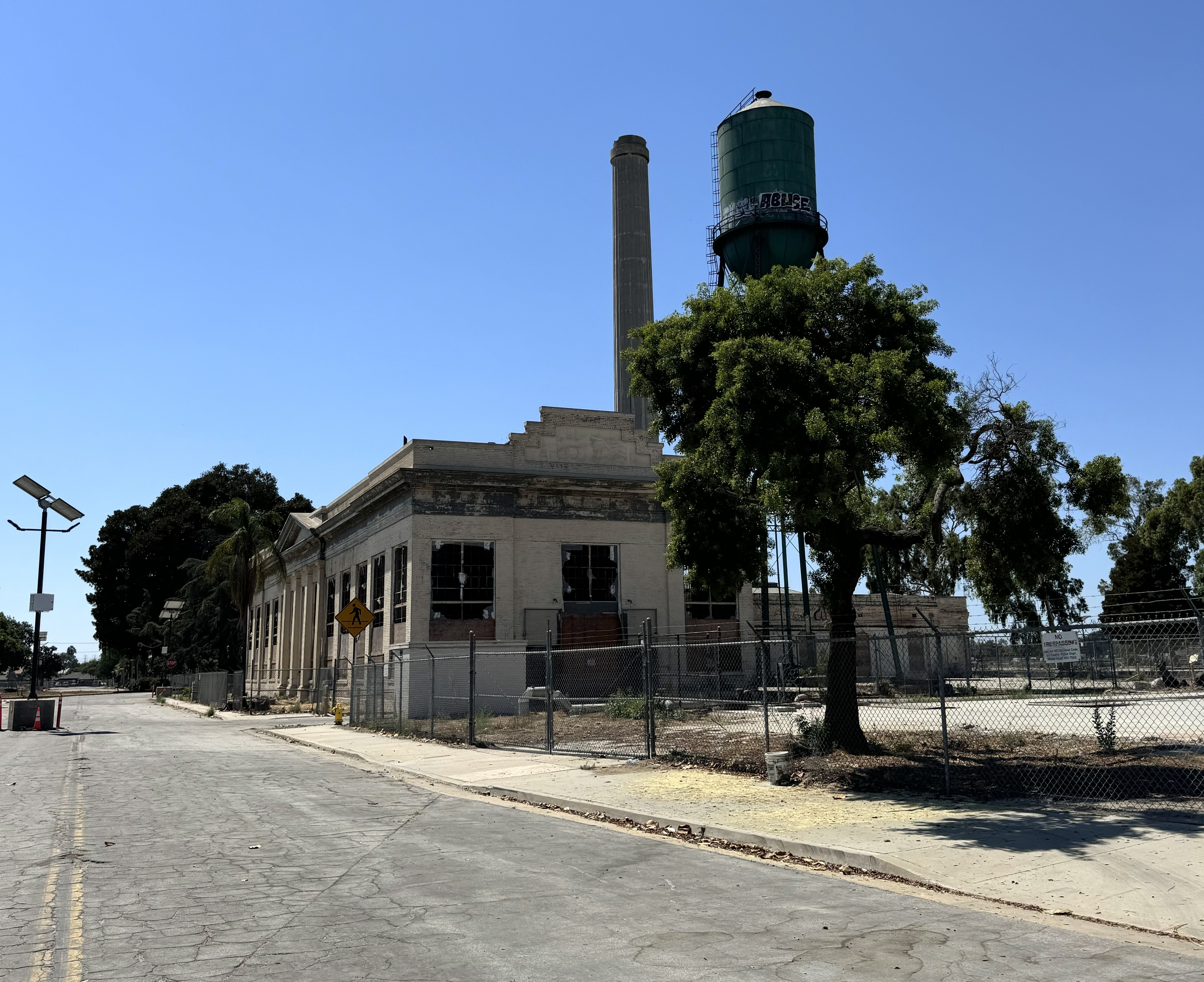
Only 4 structures from the historic South Campus still stand, including the original power station and water tower.

The 74-acre historic Rancho Los Amigos South Campus was vacated and boarded up in 1988. Over time, it deteriorated due to weather, interior and exterior vandalism and arson. On June 26, 2017, arsonists destroyed William Harriman's former home and a second building on the Southwestern corner of the property. On October 1, 2021 the Los Angeles County Board of Supervisors approved the demolition of 103 vacant buildings in the historic South Campus. Concerns were raised by the Los Angeles Conservancy which had identified over 60 historic buildings slated for demolition. They questioned the need for wholesale demolition of the Historic South Campus, as only 35 acres of the 74-acre campus were slated for new construction. Primarily developed between 1907 and 1932, these structures provided a rare glimpse into the early history of Los Angeles. Listed in the California Register, a historic resources survey found the historic district eligible for the National Register of Historic Places. On February 23, 2022; arsonists ignited another fire which destroyed 2 buildings. In March 2024, Rancho Los Amigos South was demolished.

== Today ==
Rancho Los Amigos National Rehabilitation Center is one of the largest comprehensive medical rehabilitation centers in the U.S. providing services to a wide range of individuals with catastrophic illnesses and injuries.

Rancho specializes in helping patients with disabilities regain skills and learn techniques to accomplish the basic activities of daily living, and returning to work or school if possible.

For more than two decades, Rancho has been ranked among "America's Best Hospitals" in Rehabilitation Medicine by U.S. News & World Report. In 2011, U.S. News ranked the Downey, California-based hospital 7th among the 138 hospitals rated in the Greater Los Angeles area.

Rancho is licensed for 207 beds. It cares for approximately 4,000 inpatients and conducts 78,000 outpatient visits annually. The hospital provides rehabilitation services in stroke, spinal cord injury, brain injury, pediatrics, orthopedics and diabetes care, pressure ulcer management, limb preservation and post- amputation care. These services help patients to obtain as much independence as they are able, so they may return to their family, school or a job if feasible.

As the rehabilitation arm of the Los Angeles County Department of Health Services healthcare system, Rancho is becoming an enhanced medical home for stroke and spinal cord injury, providing lifetime care for seniors and persons with disabilities. Rancho continues to pioneer creative programs that promote recovery, community reintegration and independence for persons recovering from or living with physical disability, including such programs as:

- Day Rehabilitation Program
- Rancho Wellness Center
- KnowBarriers Patient Achievement Program
- Acute Stroke Services
- Advanced Robotics Center
- Virtual Reality Center
- Rehab Engineering
- Pathokinesiology Laboratory
- Adult Day Services and Alzheimer's Day Care Resource Center
- Center for Applied Rehabilitation Technology
- Spinal Cord Injury Project
- Aging with a Disability
- Dentistry for People with Disabilities
- Advanced Diagnostic/Monitoring Laboratory
- Telemedicine

These programs serve patient needs directly and provide advocacy, research platforms, education, and easy access to services.

Rancho also provides its patients with many innovative patient programs that strive to promote self-esteem and achieve independence. These include:

- The Art of Rancho Program
- Don Knabe Pediatric Arts Program
- Performing Arts of Rancho
- Wheelchair Sports Program
- Therapeutic Horseback Riding Program
- Spinal Injury Games
- Patient Fashion Show
- Winter Therapeutic Sports Program
- Pet Therapy Program
- Pediatric Carnival Day
- Rancho Stroke Walk

Rancho continues its mission of providing each patient with the best possible medical and rehabilitation services, while advancing its service delivery model and access to one of the best physical medicine and rehabilitation care facilities in the country.
