= Gait analysis =

Study of locomotion

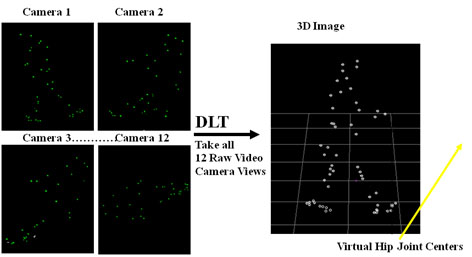
Acquisition of information on the position of the markers in 2D through the chambers of the left and right, this combination of information giving rise to a 3D image on the position of the markers

Gait analysis is the systematic study of animal locomotion, more specifically the study of human motion, using the eye and the brain of observers, augmented by instrumentation for measuring body movements, body mechanics, and the activity of the muscles. Gait analysis is used to assess and treat individuals with conditions affecting their ability to walk. It is also commonly used in sports biomechanics to help athletes run more efficiently and to identify posture-related or movement-related problems in people with injuries.

The study encompasses quantification (introduction and analysis of measurable parameters of gaits), as well as interpretation, i.e. drawing various conclusions about the animal (health, age, size, weight, speed etc.) from its gait pattern.

== History ==
The pioneers of scientific gait analysis were Aristotle in De Motu Animalium (On the Gait of Animals) and much later in 1680, Giovanni Alfonso Borelli also called De Motu Animalium (I et II). In the 1890s, the German anatomist Christian Wilhelm Braune and Otto Fischer published a series of papers on the biomechanics of human gait under loaded and unloaded conditions.

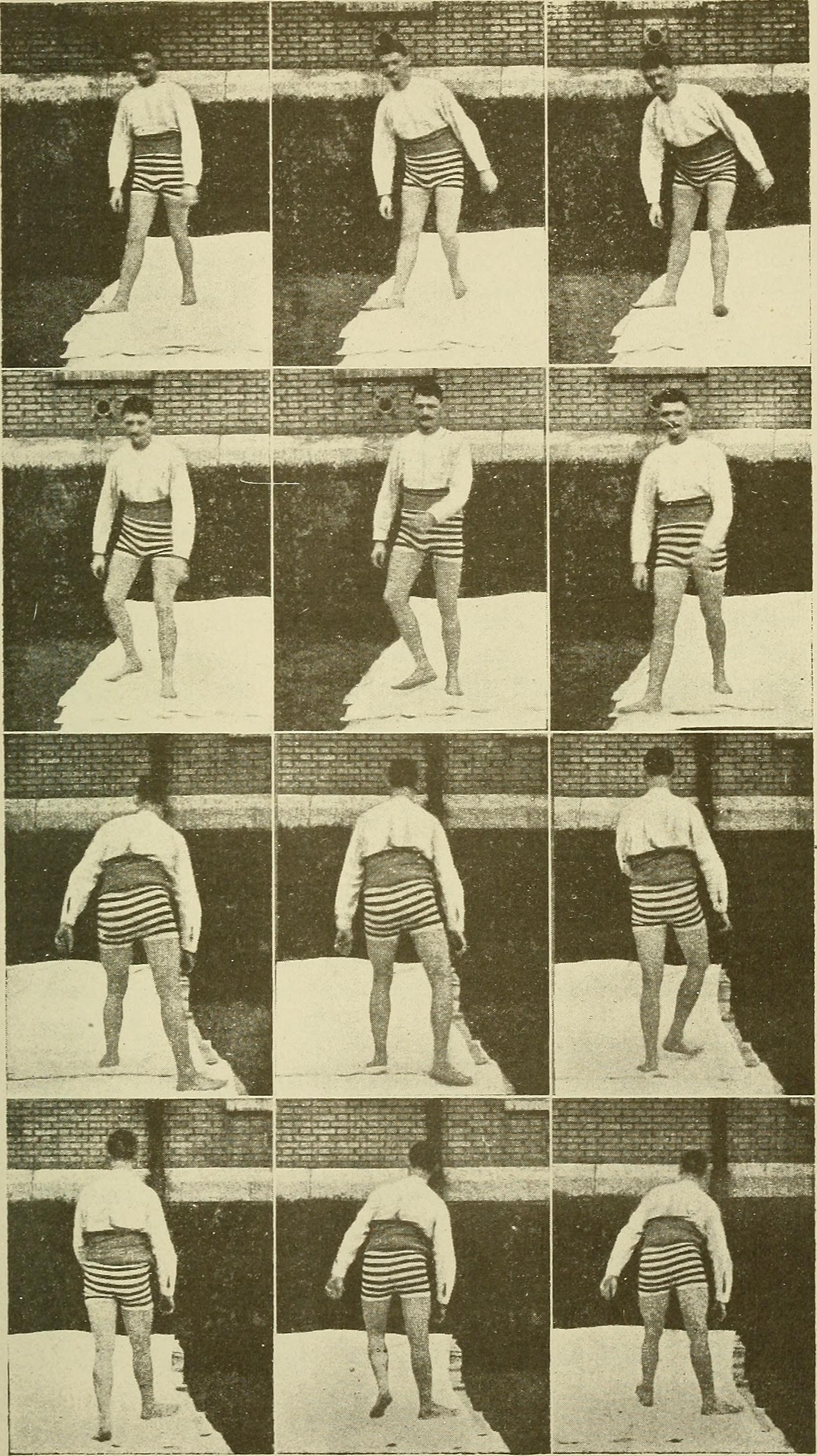
Medical gait photography, 1918

With the development of photography and cinematography, it became possible to capture image sequences that reveal details of human and animal locomotion that were not noticeable by watching the movement with the naked eye. Eadweard Muybridge and Étienne-Jules Marey were pioneers of these developments in the early 1900s. For example, serial photography first revealed the detailed sequence of the horse "gallop", which was usually misrepresented in paintings made prior to this discovery.

Although much early research was done using film cameras, the widespread application of gait analysis to humans with pathological conditions such as cerebral palsy, Parkinson's disease, and neuromuscular disorders, began in the 1970s with the availability of video camera systems that could produce detailed studies of individual patients within realistic cost and time constraints. The development of treatment regimes, often involving orthopedic surgery, based on gait analysis results, advanced significantly in the 1980s. Many leading orthopedic hospitals worldwide now have gait labs that are routinely used to design treatment plans and for follow-up monitoring.

Development of modern computer based systems occurred independently during the late 1970s and early 1980s in several hospital based research labs, some through collaborations with the aerospace industry. Commercial development soon followed with the emergence of commercial television and later infrared camera systems in the mid-1980s.

== Process and equipment ==
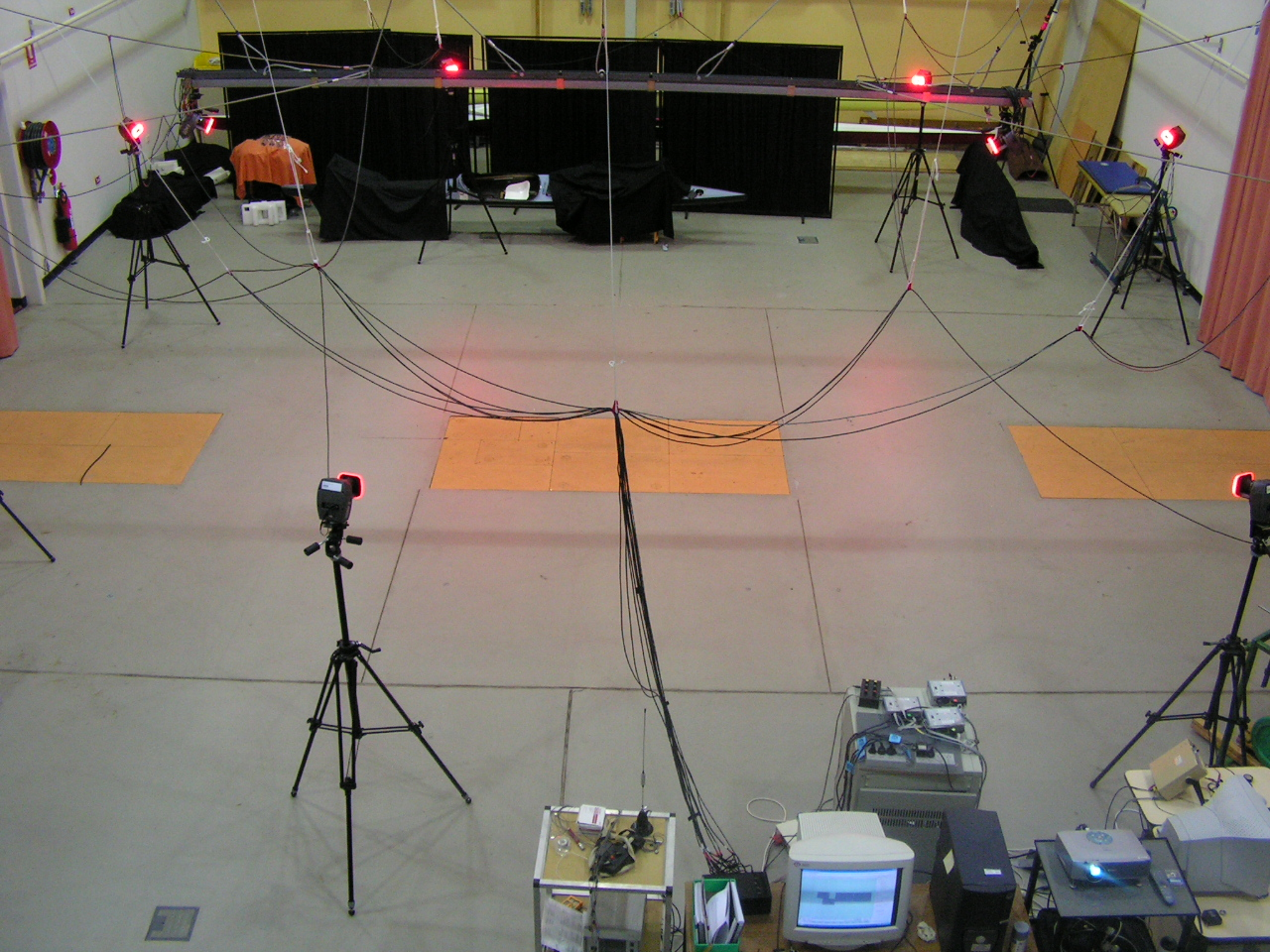
Gait analysis laboratory equipped with infrared cameras and floor mounted force platforms

A typical gait analysis laboratory has several cameras (video or infrared) placed around a walkway or a treadmill, which are linked to a computer. The patient has markers located at various points of reference of the body (e.g., iliac spines of the pelvis, ankle malleolus, and the condyles of the knee), or groups of markers applied to half of the body segments. The patient walks down the catwalk or the treadmill and the computer calculates the trajectory of each marker in three dimensions. A model is applied to calculate the movement of the underlying bones. This gives a complete breakdown of the movement of each joint. One common method is to use Helen Hayes Hospital marker set, in which a total of 15 markers are attached on the lower body. The 15 marker motions are analyzed analytically, and it provides angular motion of each joint.

To calculate the kinetics of gait patterns, most labs have floor-mounted load transducers, also known as force platforms, which measure the ground reaction forces and moments, including the magnitude, direction and location (called the center of pressure). The spatial distribution of forces can be measured with pedobarography equipment. Adding this to the known dynamics of each body segment enables the solution of equations based on the Newton–Euler equations of motion permitting computations of the net forces and the net moments of force about each joint at every stage of the gait cycle. The computational method for this is known as inverse dynamics.

This use of kinetics, however, does not result in information for individual muscles but muscle groups, such as the extensor or flexors of the limb. To detect the activity and contribution of individual muscles to movement, it is necessary to investigate the electrical activity of muscles. Many labs also use surface electrodes attached to the skin to detect the electrical activity or electromyogram (EMG) of muscles. In this way it is possible to investigate the activation times of muscles and, to some degree, the magnitude of their activation—thereby assessing their contribution to gait. Deviations from normal kinematic, kinetic or EMG patterns are used to diagnose specific pathologies, predict the outcome of treatments, or determine the effectiveness of training programs

== Factors and parameters ==
The gait analysis is modulated or modified by many factors, and changes in the normal gait pattern can be transient or permanent. The factors can be of various types:

- Extrinsic: such as terrain, footwear, clothing, cargo
- Intrinsic: sex, weight, height, age, etc.
- Physical: such as weight, height, physique
- Psychological: personality type, emotions
- Physiological: anthropometric characteristics, i.e., measurements and proportions of body
- Pathological: for example trauma, neurological diseases, musculoskeletal anomalies, psychiatric disorders

The parameters taken into account for the gait analysis are as follows:

- Step length
- Stride length
- Cadence
- Speed
- Dynamic base
- Progression line
- Foot angle
- Hip angle
- Squat performance

== Techniques ==
Walking sequences recorded by motion capture

Gait analysis involves measurement, where measurable parameters are introduced and analyzed, and interpretation, where conclusions about the subject (health, age, size, weight, speed, etc.) are drawn. The analysis is the measurement of the following:

=== Temporal / spatial ===
It consists of the calculation of speed, the length of the rhythm, pitch, and so on. These measurements are carried out through:

- Stopwatch and marks on the ground.
- Walking on a pressure mat.
- Range laser sensors scanning a plane a few centimeters above the floor.
- Inertial sensors and software to interpret 3D gyroscopes and 3D accelerometric data.

=== Kinematics ===
1. Chronophotography is the most basic method for recording of movement. Strobe lighting at known frequency has been used in the past to aid in the analysis of gait on single photographic images.
2. Cine film or video recordings using footage from single or multiple cameras can be used to measure joint angles and velocities. This method has been aided by the development of analysis software that greatly simplifies the analysis process and allows for analysis in three dimensions rather than two dimensions only.
3. Passive marker systems, using reflective markers (typically reflective balls), allows for accurate measurement of movements using multiple cameras (typically five to twelve cameras), simultaneously. The cameras utilize high-powered strobes (typically red, near infrared or infrared) with matching filters to record the reflection from the markers placed on the body. Markers are located at palpable anatomical landmarks. Based on the angle and time delay between the original and reflected signal, triangulation of the marker in space is possible. Software is used to create three dimensional trajectories from these markers that are subsequently given identification labels. A computer model is then used to compute joint angles from the relative marker positions of the labeled trajectories. These are also used for motion capture in the motion picture industry.
4. Active marker systems are similar to the passive marker system but use "active" markers. These markers are triggered by the incoming infra red signal and respond by sending out a corresponding signal of their own. This signal is then used to triangulate the location of the marker. The advantage of this system over the passive one is that individual markers work at predefined frequencies and therefore, have their own "identity". This means that no post-processing of marker locations is required, however, the systems tend to be less forgiving for out-of-view markers than the passive systems.
5. Inertial (cameraless) systems based on MEMS inertial sensors, biomechanical models, and sensor fusion algorithms. These full-body or partial body systems can be used indoors and outdoors regardless of lighting conditions.

=== Markerless gait capture ===
- Markerless gait capture systems utilize one or more color cameras or 2.5D depth sensors (i.e. Kinect) to directly calculate the body joint positions from a sequence of images. The markerless system allows non-invasive human gait analysis in a natural environment without any marker attachment. Eliminating markers can expand the applicability of human gait measurement and analysis techniques, considerably reduce the preparation time, and enable efficient and accurate motion assessment in all kinds of applications. Currently, the main markerless system is the video-based motion capture with monocular camera or multiple camera studio. Nowadays, the depth sensor-based gait analysis for clinical applications becomes more and more popular. Since depth sensors can measure the depth information and provide a 2.5D depth image, they have effectively simplified the task of foreground/background subtraction and significantly reduced pose ambiguities in monocular human pose estimation.

=== Pressure measurement ===
Pressure measurement systems are an additional way to measure gait by providing insights into pressure distribution, contact area, center of force movement and symmetry between sides. These systems typically provide more than just pressure information; additional information available from these systems are force, timing and spatial parameters. Different methods for assessing pressure are available, like a pressure measurement mat or walkway (longer in length to capture more foot strikes), as well as in-shoe pressure measurement systems (where sensors are placed inside the shoe). Many pressure measurement systems integrate with additional types of analysis systems, like motion capture, EMG or force plates to provide a comprehensive gait analysis.

=== Kinetics ===
Is the study of the forces involved in the production of movements.

=== Dynamic electromyography ===
Is the study of patterns of muscle activity during gait.

== Applications ==
Gait analysis is used to analyze the walking ability of humans and animals, so this technology can be used for the following applications:

=== Medical diagnostics ===
Pathological gait may reflect compensations for underlying pathologies, or be responsible for causation of symptoms in itself. Cerebral palsy and stroke patients are commonly seen in gait labs. The study of gait allows diagnoses and intervention strategies to be made, as well as permitting future developments in rehabilitation engineering. Aside from clinical applications, gait analysis is used in professional sports training to optimize and improve athletic performance.

Gait analysis techniques allow for the assessment of gait disorders and the effects of corrective orthopedic surgery. Options for treatment of cerebral palsy include the artificial paralysis of spastic muscles using Botox or the lengthening, re-attachment or detachment of particular tendons. Corrections of distorted bony anatomy are also undertaken (osteotomy).

=== Chiropractic and osteopathic uses ===
Observation of gait is also beneficial for diagnoses in chiropractic and osteopathic professions as hindrances in gait may be indicative of a misaligned pelvis or sacrum. As the sacrum and ilium biomechanically move in opposition to each other, adhesions between the two of them via the sacrospinous or sacrotuberous ligaments (among others) may suggest a rotated pelvis. Both doctors of chiropractic and osteopathic medicine use gait to discern the listing of a pelvis and can employ various techniques to restore a full range of motion to areas involved in ambulatory movement. Chiropractic adjustment of the pelvis has shown a trend in helping restore gait patterns as has osteopathic manipulative therapy (OMT).

=== Comparative biomechanics ===
By studying the gait of non-human animals, more insight can be gained about the mechanics of locomotion, which has diverse implications for understanding the biology of the species in question as well as locomotion more broadly.

=== Gait as biometrics ===
Gait recognition is a type of behavioral biometric authentication that recognizes and verifies people by their walking style and pace. Advances in gait recognition have led to the development of techniques for forensics use since each person can have a gait defined by unique measurements such as the locations of ankle, knee, and hip.

=== Surveillance ===
In 2018, there were reports that the Government of China had developed surveillance tools based on gait analysis, allowing them to uniquely identify people, even if their faces are obscured.

== Popular media ==
- G. K. Chesterton premised one of his Father Brown mysteries, "The Queer Feet", on gait recognition.
- Cory Doctorow makes much of gait recognition as a security technique used in a high school in his book Little Brother.
- Arthur Conan Doyle has Sherlock Holmes use gait analysis to identify the height of the Rache killer in A Study in Scarlet.
- The movie Mission: Impossible – Rogue Nation features gait analysis, in a scene where Benji Dunn must infiltrate a facility that uses gait analysis software as part of its security protocol.

== See also ==
- Biometric points
- Gait Analysis: Normal and Pathological Function, Second Edition
- Gait Abnormality Rating Scale
- Gait deviations
- Multilinear principal component analysis
- Multilinear subspace learning
- Pattern recognition
- Terrestrial locomotion in animals
- Comparison of orthotics
