= Derakhshani =

Derakhshani is a surname. Notable people with the surname include:

- Ali Akbar Derakhshani (1896–1978), Iranian army officer
- Borna Derakhshani (born 2002), Iranian chess player
- Dorsa Derakhshani (born 1998), Iranian-American chess player
- Majid Derakhshani (born 1957), Iranian musician and composer
- Reza Derakhshani, computer scientist and electrical engineer
