= 2020–21 La Liga =

90th season of La Liga

La Liga
- Season: 2020–21
- Dates: 12 September 2020 – 23 May 2021
- Champions: Atlético Madrid; 11th title
- Relegated: Huesca; Valladolid; Eibar
- Champions League: Atlético Madrid; Real Madrid; Barcelona; Sevilla; Villarreal (as Europa League winners)
- Europa League: Real Sociedad; Real Betis
- Matches: 380
- Goals: 953 (2.51 per match)
- Best player: Jan Oblak
- Top goalscorer: Lionel Messi (30 goals)
- Best goalkeeper: Jan Oblak (0.66 goals/match)
- Biggest home win: Atlético Madrid 6–1 Granada (27 September 2020); Atlético Madrid 5–0 Eibar (18 April 2021)
- Biggest away win: Real Sociedad 1–6 Barcelona (21 March 2021)
- Highest scoring: Atlético Madrid 6–1 Granada (27 September 2020); Barcelona 5–2 Real Betis (7 November 2020); Levante 4–3 Real Betis (29 December 2020); Huesca 3–4 Celta Vigo (7 March 2021); Real Sociedad 1–6 Barcelona (21 March 2021); Celta Vigo 3–4 Sevilla (12 April 2021); Barcelona 5–2 Getafe (22 April 2021)
- Longest winning run: Atlético Madrid (8 matches)
- Longest unbeaten run: Barcelona (19 matches)
- Longest winless run: Eibar; Elche (16 matches)
- Longest losing run: Eibar (5 matches)

The 2020–21 La Liga season, also known as La Liga Santander due to sponsorship reasons, was the 90th since its establishment. The season began on 12 September 2020 and concluded on 23 May 2021. The fixtures were announced on 31 August 2020.

Real Madrid were the defending champions, after winning a record 34th title in the previous season. Huesca, Cádiz and Elche joined as the promoted clubs from the 2019–20 Segunda División. They replaced Espanyol, Mallorca and Leganés, who were relegated to the 2020–21 Segunda División.

Exceptionally, this season the five substitutions were maintained in a maximum of three rounds per team, adopted in May 2020 due to the impact of the COVID-19 pandemic.

Atlético Madrid won their eleventh La Liga title on the last day of the season, after a 2–1 comeback win against Valladolid, who were relegated with the defeat. It was their first title since 2013–14. Barcelona and Real Madrid were the only other teams to have won the title since Atlético Madrid last did so.

== Teams ==
=== Promotion and relegation (pre-season) ===
A total of twenty teams contested the league, including seventeen sides from the 2019–20 season and three promoted from the 2019–20 Segunda División. This included the two top teams from the Segunda División, and the winners of the promotion play-offs.

Teams relegated to Segunda División

The first team to be relegated from La Liga were Espanyol, after a 0–1 loss to city rivals Barcelona on 8 July 2020, ending their 26-year stay in the top tier. The second team to be relegated were Mallorca, following a 1–2 home defeat against Granada on 16 July 2020, suffering an immediate return to the second division. The third and final team to be relegated were Leganés, after drawing 2–2 against Real Madrid on 19 July 2020 in their final game of the season. This ended Lega's four-year stint in the first tier.

Teams promoted from Segunda División

On 12 July 2020, Cádiz became the first side to mathematically be promoted, assured of a return to the top flight after a fourteen-year absence following Oviedo's 4–2 win against Zaragoza. The second team to earn promotion were Huesca, following their 3–0 win against Numancia on 17 July 2020. This marked an immediate return to the first division after a season away. The final team to achieve promotion were Elche on 23 August 2020, following a 1–0 aggregate victory over Girona in the final of the promotion play-offs, sealing a return to La Liga after a five-year absence.

=== Stadiums and locations ===
Location of teams in 2020–21 La Liga
Location of Community of Madrid teams in 2020–21 La Liga

Teams	Locations	Stadiums	Capacity
Alavés	Vitoria-Gasteiz	Mendizorrotza	19,840
Athletic Bilbao	Bilbao	San Mamés	53,289
Atlético Madrid	Madrid	Wanda Metropolitano	68,456
Barcelona	Barcelona	Camp Nou	99,354
Cádiz	Cádiz	Ramón de Carranza	20,724
Celta Vigo	Vigo	Abanca-Balaídos	29,000
Eibar	Eibar	Ipurua	8,164
Elche	Elche	Martínez Valero	33,732
Getafe	Getafe	Coliseum Alfonso Pérez	17,393
Granada	Granada	Nuevo Los Cármenes	19,336
Huesca	Huesca	El Alcoraz	7,638
Levante	Valencia	Ciutat de València	26,354
Osasuna	Pamplona	El Sadar	23,576
Real Betis	Seville	Benito Villamarín	60,721
Real Madrid	Madrid	Alfredo Di Stéfano (Note: Stadium used for games behind closed doors.)	6,000
Real Sociedad	San Sebastián	Anoeta	39,500
Sevilla	Seville	Ramón Sánchez Pizjuán	43,883
Valencia	Valencia	Mestalla	55,000
Valladolid	Valladolid	José Zorrilla	28,012
Villarreal	Villarreal	Estadio de la Cerámica	24,890

=== Personnel and sponsorship ===
Team	Manager	Captain	Kit manufacturer	Shirt sponsor(s)
Alavés	(Spain) Javier Calleja	(Spain) Manu García	Kelme	Betway, Zotapay,^{1} Exiom Group,^{2} InJoo,^{3} Integra Energía^{3}
Athletic Bilbao	(Spain) Marcelino	(Spain) Iker Muniain	New Balance	Kutxabank
Atlético Madrid	(Argentina) Diego Simeone	(Spain) Koke	Νike	Plus500, Ria Money Transfer,^{1} Hyundai^{2}, VERSUS^{3}
Barcelona	(Netherlands) Ronald Koeman	(Argentina) Lionel Messi	Νike	Rakuten, UNICEF,^{1} Beko^{2}
Cádiz	(Spain) Álvaro Cervera	(Spain) Jon Ander Garrido	Adidas	Dafabet, Humanox^{1}
Celta Vigo	(Argentina) Eduardo Coudet	(Spain) Hugo Mallo	Adidas	Estrella Galicia 0,0, Abanca,^{1} Visit Maldives,^{2} Grupo Recalvi^{3}
Eibar	(Spain) José Luis Mendilibar	(Spain) Sergi Enrich	Joma	Alyco
Elche	(Spain) Fran Escribá	(Spain) Nino	Hummel	TM Grupo Inmobiliario
Getafe	(Spain) José Bordalás	(Togo) Djené	Joma	Tecnocasa Group, Reale Seguros,^{2} El Brillante,^{3} Tejada's Forever^{3}
Granada	(Spain) Diego Martínez	(Spain) Víctor Díaz	Νike	Winamax, Caja Rural Granada,^{2} Coviran^{3}
Huesca	(Spain) Pacheta	(Spain) Jorge Pulido	Kelme	Huesca La Magia, Apisa,^{1} Bodega Sommos,^{1} Grupo Cosehisa,^{2} Ambar 0,0^{3}
Levante	(Spain) Paco López	(Spain) José Luis Morales	Macron	Betway, Baleària,^{1} Sesderma^{1}
Osasuna	(Spain) Jagoba Arrasate	(Spain) Oier Sanjurjo	Adidas	Verleal, Victorino Vicente,^{1} Selk,^{2} Clínica Universidad de Navarra^{3}
Real Betis	(Chile) Manuel Pellegrini	(Spain) Joaquín	Kappa	Betway, Bitci.com,^{1} Reale Seguros,^{2} Turismo de Sevilla^{3}
Real Madrid	(France) Zinedine Zidane	(Spain) Sergio Ramos	Adidas	Emirates
Real Sociedad	(Spain) Imanol Alguacil	(Spain) Asier Illarramendi	Macron	IQONIQ, Kutxabank,^{1} Reale Seguros^{2}
Sevilla	(Spain) Julen Lopetegui	(Spain) Jesús Navas	Νike	Marathonbet, AliExpress,^{1} Valvoline,^{2} EverFX,^{3} Turismo de Sevilla^{3}
Valencia	(Spain) Voro (interim)	(Spain) José Gayà	Puma	bwin, Libertex,^{1} Sailun Tyres,^{2} Škoda^{3}
Valladolid	(Spain) Sergio González	(Spain) Míchel Herrero	Adidas	Estrella Galicia 0,0, Herbalife Nutrition,^{1} Integra Energía,^{2} Inexo^{3}
Villarreal	(Spain) Unai Emery	(Spain) Mario Gaspar	Joma	Pamesa Cerámica

1. On the back of shirt.
2. On the sleeves.
3. On the shorts.

=== Managerial changes ===
Team	Outgoing manager	Manner of departure	Date of vacancy	Position in table	Incoming manager	Date of appointment
Villarreal	(Spain) Javier Calleja	Sacked	20 July 2020	Pre-season	(Spain) Unai Emery	23 July 2020
Alavés	(Spain) Juan Muñiz	End of contract	20 July 2020	Pre-season	(Spain) Pablo Machín	5 August 2020
Real Betis	(Spain) Alexis Trujillo	End of interim spell	20 July 2020	Pre-season	(Chile) Manuel Pellegrini	9 July 2020
Valencia	(Spain) Voro	End of interim spell	20 July 2020	Pre-season	(Spain) Javi Gracia	27 July 2020
Barcelona	(Spain) Quique Setién	Sacked	17 August 2020	Pre-season	(Netherlands) Ronald Koeman	19 August 2020
Elche	(Spain) Pacheta	Resigned	25 August 2020	Pre-season	(Argentina) Jorge Almirón	26 August 2020
Celta Vigo	(Spain) Óscar García	Sacked	9 November 2020	17th	(Argentina) Eduardo Coudet	12 November 2020
Athletic Bilbao	(Spain) Gaizka Garitano	Sacked	3 January 2021	9th	(Spain) Marcelino	4 January 2021
Huesca	(Spain) Míchel	Sacked	12 January 2021	20th	(Spain) Pacheta	12 January 2021
Alavés	(Spain) Pablo Machín	Sacked	12 January 2021	16th	(Spain) Abelardo	12 January 2021
Elche	(Argentina) Jorge Almirón	Resigned	12 February 2021	19th	(Spain) Fran Escribá	14 February 2021
Alavés	(Spain) Abelardo	Sacked	5 April 2021	20th	(Spain) Javier Calleja	5 April 2021
Valencia	(Spain) Javi Gracia	Sacked	2 May 2021	14th	(Spain) Voro (caretaker)	3 May 2021

== League table ==
Pos	Team	Pld	W	D	L	GF	GA	GD	Pts	Qualification or relegation
1	Atlético Madrid (C)	38	26	8	4	67	25	+42	86	Qualification for the Champions League group stage
2	Real Madrid	38	25	9	4	67	28	+39	84	Qualification for the Champions League group stage
3	Barcelona	38	24	7	7	85	38	+47	79	Qualification for the Champions League group stage
4	Sevilla	38	24	5	9	53	33	+20	77	Qualification for the Champions League group stage
5	Real Sociedad	38	17	11	10	59	38	+21	62	Qualification for the Europa League group stage (Note: Since the winners of the 2020–21 Copa del Rey, Barcelona, qualified for the 2021–22 UEFA Champions League based on league position, the spot awarded to the cup winners (Europa League group stage) was passed to the sixth-placed team, and the spot awarded to the sixth-placed team (2021–22 UEFA Europa Conference League play-off round) was passed to the seventh-placed team, Villarreal.)
6	Real Betis	38	17	10	11	50	50	0	61	Qualification for the Europa League group stage
7	Villarreal	38	15	13	10	60	44	+16	58	Qualification for the Champions League group stage (Note: Villarreal qualified for the 2021–22 UEFA Champions League by winning the 2020–21 UEFA Europa League. Based on their league position (7th), they would have received the spot above to enter the Europa Conference League play-off round. This spot was vacated without replacement as per UEFA regulations.)
8	Celta Vigo	38	14	11	13	55	57	−2	53	
9	Granada	38	13	7	18	47	65	−18	46 (Note: Granada finished ahead of Athletic Bilbao on head-to-head goal difference: Granada 2–0 Athletic Bilbao, Athletic Bilbao 2–1 Granada.)	
10	Athletic Bilbao	38	11	13	14	46	42	+4	46	
11	Osasuna	38	11	11	16	37	48	−11	44 (Note: Osasuna finished ahead of Cádiz on head-to-head points: Cádiz 0–2 Osasuna, Osasuna 3–2 Cádiz.)	
12	Cádiz	38	11	11	16	36	58	−22	44	
13	Valencia	38	10	13	15	50	53	−3	43	
14	Levante	38	9	14	15	46	57	−11	41	
15	Getafe	38	9	11	18	28	43	−15	38	
16	Alavés	38	9	11	18	36	57	−21	38	
17	Elche	38	8	12	18	34	55	−21	36	
18	Huesca (R)	38	7	13	18	34	53	−19	34	Relegation to Segunda División
19	Valladolid (R)	38	5	16	17	34	57	−23	31	Relegation to Segunda División
20	Eibar (R)	38	6	12	20	29	52	−23	30	Relegation to Segunda División

Source: La Liga
Rules for classification: 1) Points; 2) Head-to-head points; 3) Head-to-head goal difference; 4) Goal difference; 5) Goals scored; 6) Fair-play points (Note: Head-to-head record is used only after all the matches between the teams in question have been played)
(C) Champions; (R) Relegated

== Results ==
Home \ Away	ALA	ATH	ATM	BAR	CAD	CEL	EIB	ELC	GET	GRA	HUE	LEV	OSA	BET	RMA	RSO	SEV	VAL	VLL	VIL
Alavés	—	1–0	1–2	1–1	1–1	1–3	2–1	0–2	0–0	4–2	1–0	2–2	0–1	0–1	1–4	0–0	1–2	2–2	1–0	2–1
Athletic Bilbao	0–0	—	2–1	2–3	0–1	0–2	1–1	1–0	5–1	2–1	2–0	2–0	2–2	4–0	0–1	0–1	2–1	1–1	2–2	1–1
Atlético Madrid	1–0	2–1	—	1–0	4–0	2–2	5–0	3–1	1–0	6–1	2–0	0–2	2–1	2–0	1–1	2–1	2–0	3–1	2–0	0–0
Barcelona	5–1	2–1	0–0	—	1–1	1–2	1–1	3–0	5–2	1–2	4–1	1–0	4–0	5–2	1–3	2–1	1–1	2–2	1–0	4–0
Cádiz	3–1	0–4	2–4	2–1	—	0–0	1–0	1–3	0–2	1–1	2–1	2–2	0–2	0–1	0–3	0–1	1–3	2–1	0–0	0–0
Celta Vigo	2–0	0–0	0–2	0–3	4–0	—	1–1	3–1	1–0	3–1	2–1	2–0	2–1	2–3	1–3	1–4	3–4	2–1	1–1	0–4
Eibar	3–0	1–2	1–2	0–1	0–2	0–0	—	0–1	0–0	2–0	1–1	0–1	0–0	1–1	1–3	0–1	0–2	0–0	1–1	1–3
Elche	0–2	2–0	0–1	0–2	1–1	1–1	1–0	—	1–3	0–1	0–0	1–0	2–2	1–1	1–1	0–3	2–1	2–1	1–1	2–2
Getafe	0–0	1–1	0–0	1–0	0–1	1–1	0–1	1–1	—	0–1	1–0	2–1	1–0	3–0	0–0	0–1	0–1	3–0	0–1	1–3
Granada	2–1	2–0	1–2	0–4	0–1	0–0	4–1	2–1	0–0	—	3–3	1–1	2–0	2–0	1–4	1–0	1–0	2–1	1–3	0–3
Huesca	1–0	1–0	0–0	0–1	0–2	3–4	1–1	3–1	0–2	3–2	—	1–1	0–0	0–2	1–2	1–0	0–1	0–0	2–2	0–0
Levante	1–1	1–1	1–1	3–3	2–2	1–1	2–1	1–1	3–0	2–2	0–2	—	0–1	4–3	0–2	2–1	0–1	1–0	2–2	1–5
Osasuna	1–1	1–0	1–3	0–2	3–2	2–0	2–1	2–0	0–0	3–1	1–1	1–3	—	0–2	0–0	0–1	0–2	3–1	0–0	1–3
Real Betis	3–2	0–0	1–1	2–3	1–0	2–1	0–2	3–1	1–0	2–1	1–0	2–0	1–0	—	2–3	0–3	1–1	2–2	2–0	1–1
Real Madrid	1–2	3–1	2–0	2–1	0–1	2–0	2–0	2–1	2–0	2–0	4–1	1–2	2–0	0–0	—	1–1	2–2	2–0	1–0	2–1
Real Sociedad	4–0	1–1	0–2	1–6	4–1	2–1	1–1	2–0	3–0	2–0	4–1	1–0	1–1	2–2	0–0	—	1–2	0–1	4–1	1–1
Sevilla	1–0	0–1	1–0	0–2	3–0	4–2	0–1	2–0	3–0	2–1	1–0	1–0	1–0	1–0	0–1	3–2	—	1–0	1–1	2–0
Valencia	1–1	2–2	0–1	2–3	1–1	2–0	4–1	1–0	2–2	2–1	1–1	4–2	1–1	0–2	4–1	2–2	0–1	—	3–0	2–1
Valladolid	0–2	2–1	1–2	0–3	1–1	1–1	1–2	2–2	2–1	1–2	1–3	1–1	3–2	1–1	0–1	1–1	1–1	0–1	—	0–2
Villarreal	3–1	1–1	0–2	1–2	2–1	2–4	2–1	0–0	1–0	2–2	1–1	2–1	1–2	1–2	1–1	1–1	4–0	2–1	2–0	—

Source: La Liga, Soccerway
Legend: Blue = home team win; Yellow = draw; Red = away team win.
For upcoming matches, an "a" indicates there is an article about the rivalry between the two participants.

== Season statistics ==
=== Scoring ===
- First goal of the season:
  (Venezuela) Yangel Herrera for Granada against Athletic Bilbao (12 September 2020)
- Last goal of the season:
  (Argentina) Papu Gómez for Sevilla against Alavés (23 May 2021)

=== Top goalscorers ===
Rank	Player	Club	Goals
1	(Argentina) Lionel Messi	Barcelona	30
2	(France) Karim Benzema	Real Madrid	23
2	(Spain) Gerard Moreno	Villarreal	23
4	(Uruguay) Luis Suárez	Atlético Madrid	21
5	(Morocco) Youssef En-Nesyri	Sevilla	18
6	(Sweden) Alexander Isak	Real Sociedad	17
7	(Spain) Iago Aspas	Celta Vigo	14
8	(France) Antoine Griezmann	Barcelona	13
8	(Spain) Rafa Mir	Huesca	13
8	(Spain) José Luis Morales	Levante	13

=== Top assists ===
Rank	Player	Club	Assists
1	(Spain) Iago Aspas	Celta Vigo	13
2	(Spain) Marcos Llorente	Atlético Madrid	11
3	(Belgium) Yannick Carrasco	Atlético Madrid	10
3	(Germany) Toni Kroos	Real Madrid	10
5	(France) Karim Benzema	Real Madrid	9
5	(Spain) Jorge de Frutos	Levante	9
5	(Argentina) Lionel Messi	Barcelona	9
5	(Spain) Denis Suárez	Celta Vigo	9
9	(Argentina) Ángel Correa	Atlético Madrid	8
9	(Spain) Mikel Oyarzabal	Real Sociedad	8
9	(Spain) Carlos Soler	Valencia	8

=== Zamora Trophy ===
The Zamora Trophy was awarded by newspaper Marca to the goalkeeper with the lowest goals-to-games ratio. A goalkeeper had to have played at least 28 games of 60 or more minutes to be eligible for the trophy.

Rank	Player	Club	Goals against	Matches	Average
1	(Slovenia) Jan Oblak	Atlético Madrid	25	38	0.66
2	(Belgium) Thibaut Courtois	Real Madrid	28	38	0.74
3	(Morocco) Yassine Bounou	Sevilla	28	33	0.85
4	(Spain) Álex Remiro	Real Sociedad	38	38	1.00
5	(Germany) Marc-André ter Stegen	Barcelona	32	31	1.03

=== Hat-tricks ===
Player	For	Against	Result	Date	Round
(Spain) Carlos Soler	Valencia	Real Madrid	4–1 (H)	8 November 2020	9
(Morocco) Youssef En-Nesyri	Sevilla	Real Sociedad	3–2 (H)	9 January 2021	18
(Morocco) Youssef En-Nesyri	Sevilla	Cádiz	3–0 (H)	23 January 2021	20
(Spain) Rafa Mir	Huesca	Valladolid	3–1 (A)	29 January 2021	21
(Sweden) Alexander Isak	Real Sociedad	Alavés	4–0 (H)	21 February 2021	24
(Spain) Gerard Moreno	Villarreal	Granada	3–0 (A)	3 April 2021	29
(Spain) Kike García	Eibar	Alavés	3–0 (H)	1 May 2021	34
(Colombia) Carlos Bacca	Villarreal	Sevilla	4–0 (H)	16 May 2021	37

=== Discipline ===
Stats from:

==== Player ====
- Most yellow cards: 15
  - (Montenegro) Stefan Savić (Atlético Madrid)
- Most red cards: 2
  - (Senegal) Pape Diop (Eibar)
  - (Togo) Djené (Getafe)
  - (Spain) Raúl García (Athletic Bilbao)
  - (France) Clément Lenglet (Barcelona)
  - (Algeria) Aïssa Mandi (Real Betis)

==== Team ====
- Most yellow cards: 114
  - Getafe
- Most red cards: 8
  - Alavés
  - Real Betis
- Fewest yellow cards: 57
  - Real Madrid
- Fewest red cards: 0
  - Atlético Madrid

== Awards ==
=== Monthly ===
Month	Player of the Month		Reference
Month	Player	Club	Reference
September	(Spain) Ansu Fati	Barcelona	
October	(Spain) Mikel Oyarzabal	Real Sociedad	
November	(Portugal) João Félix	Atlético Madrid	
December	(Spain) Iago Aspas	Celta Vigo	
January	(Morocco) Youssef En-Nesyri	Sevilla	
February	(Argentina) Lionel Messi	Barcelona	
March	(France) Karim Benzema	Real Madrid	
April	(Brazil) Fernando	Sevilla	
May	(Slovenia) Jan Oblak	Atlético Madrid	

=== Seasonal ===
Seasonal awards
Award	Recipient	Reference
Best Player	(Slovenia) Jan Oblak (Atlético Madrid)	
Best Goalkeeper	(Slovenia) Jan Oblak (Atlético Madrid)	
Best Coach	(Argentina) Diego Simeone (Atlético Madrid)	

=== Team of the Season ===
Team of the Season
Goalkeeper	(Belgium) Thibaut Courtois (Real Madrid)			
Defenders	(Spain) Jordi Alba (Barcelona)		(Spain) Javi Galán (Huesca)	(France) Jules Koundé (Sevilla)
Midfielders	(Spain) Marcos Llorente (Atlético Madrid)	(Netherlands) Frenkie de Jong (Barcelona)	(Spain) Carlos Soler (Valencia)	(Croatia) Luka Modrić (Real Madrid)
Forwards	(Spain) Gerard Moreno (Villarreal)		(France) Karim Benzema (Real Madrid)	(Argentina) Lionel Messi (Barcelona)

EA SPORTS Team of the Season
Pos.	Player	Club
GK	(Slovenia) Jan Oblak	Atlético Madrid
DF	(Spain) Jesús Navas	Sevilla
DF	(France) Raphaël Varane	Real Madrid
DF	(France) Jules Koundé	Sevilla
DF	(Spain) Jordi Alba	Barcelona
MF	(Brazil) Casemiro	Real Madrid
MF	(Netherlands) Frenkie de Jong	Barcelona
MF	(Spain) Marcos Llorente	Atlético Madrid
MF	(France) Nabil Fekir	Real Betis
MF	(Belgium) Yannick Carrasco	Atlético Madrid
FW	(Spain) Lucas Vázquez	Real Madrid
FW	(France) Karim Benzema	Real Madrid
FW	(Uruguay) Luis Suárez	Atlético Madrid
FW	(Spain) Gerard Moreno	Villarreal
FW	(Argentina) Lionel Messi	Barcelona
