= Retinal scan =

Biometric method for identity verification

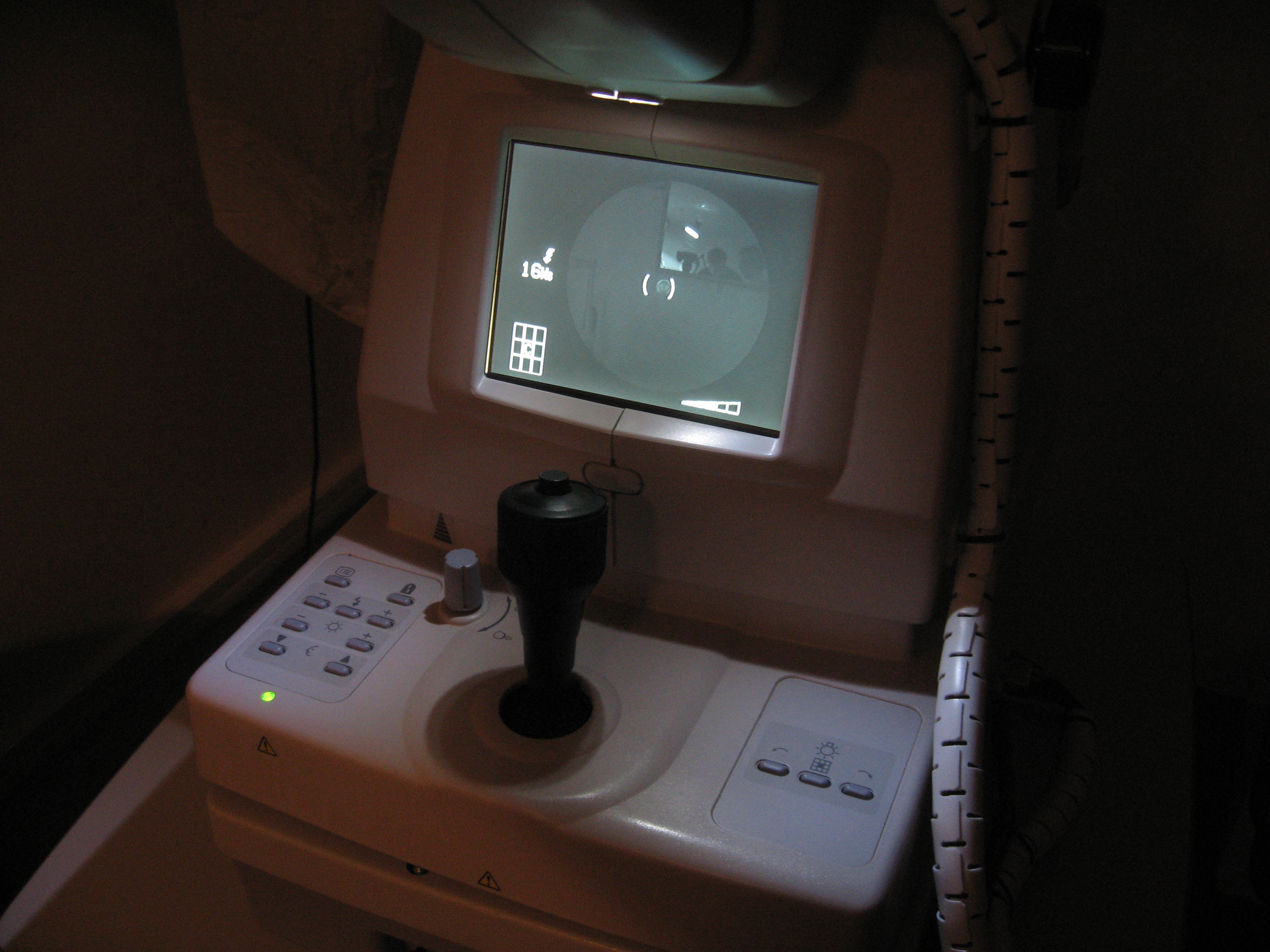
A close-up view of the controls of a Topcon retinal camera

A retinal scan is a biometric technique that uses unique patterns on a person's retina blood vessels. It is not to be confused with other ocular-based technologies: iris recognition, commonly called an "iris scan", and eye vein verification that uses scleral veins.

The human retina is a thin tissue made up of neural cells that is located in the posterior portion of the eye. Because of the complex structure of the capillaries that supply the retina with blood, each person's retina is unique, making retinal scans an emerging authentication method. The network of blood vessels in the retina is not entirely genetically determined and thus even identical twins do not share a similar pattern.

Although retinal patterns may be altered in cases of diabetes, glaucoma or retinal degenerative disorders, the retina typically remains unchanged from birth until death. Due to its unique and unchanging nature, the retina appears to be the most precise and reliable biometric, aside from DNA. Retinal scanning has an estimated error rate of one in ten million, compared to an error rate as high as one in 500 for fingerprint identification.

A retinal scan is performed by casting an unperceived beam of low-energy infrared light into a person’s eye as they look through the scanner's eyepiece. This beam of light traces a standardized path on the retina. Because retinal blood vessels absorb light more readily than the surrounding tissue, the amount of reflection varies during the scan. The pattern of variations is digitized and stored in a database.

== History ==
The idea for retinal identification was first conceived by Carleton Simon and Isadore Goldstein and was published in the New York State Journal of Medicine in 1935. The idea was ahead of its time, but once technology caught up, the concept for a retinal scanning device emerged in 1975. In 1976, Robert "Buzz" Hill formed a corporation named EyeDentify, Inc., and made a full-time effort to research and develop such a device. In 1978, specific means for a retinal scanner was patented, followed by a commercial model in 1981.

== In popular culture ==
Because of the relative obscurity and "high tech" nature of retinal scans, they are frequently used as a device in fiction to suggest that an area has been particularly strongly secured against intrusion. Some notable examples include:

- In the movie Star Trek II: The Wrath of Khan (1982), Admiral Kirk gains access to top secret computer files by use of a retinal scan.
- In the science fiction novel The Long Result by John Brunner (1965), a retinal scanner is used to access a Remote Control Centre at a spaceport.
- In the movie Batman (1966), Batman describes to Robin how the tiny vessels in the retina are unique to the individual, and by utilizing the portable retina scan device in the Batmobile, they confirm the identity of the Penguin.
- In the comic book film series X-Men Charles Xavier uses a retinal scanner to unlock Cerebro. This is bypassed by the shape-shifter Mystique assuming his form and William Stryker using an unknown mechanism.
- In the Half-Life video game series, the scientists of Black Mesa are frequently shown operating retinal scanners to access locked doors or hidden devices.
- Characters in the films Never Say Never Again (1983), GoldenEye (1995), Mission: Impossible (1996), Barb Wire (1996), Entrapment (1999), Minority Report (2002) and Paycheck (2003) and Charlie's Angels (film) (2000) utilize or try to deceive retinal scanners.
- In the Splinter Cell video game series, retinal scanners are used to identify agents within the Third Echelon and guards within military/business complexes.
- In the 2012 film The Avengers, characters gain access to a quantity of very rare iridium by using two devices: one which apparently hooks onto a victim's eyeball, and another which receives signals from the first to holographically reconstruct the retina to fool the scanner.
- In the 1993 film Demolition Man (film), Simon Phoenix deceives a retinal scanner by taking the eyeball from a prison doctor.
- In the video game Doom (2016), a retinal scanner linked with a mutilated researcher is utilized to gain access to the BFG 9000.

== Uses ==
Retinal scanners are typically used for authentication and identification purposes. Retinal scanning has been utilized by several government agencies including the FBI, CIA, and NASA, and has also been used in prisons. Retinal scanning also has medical application. Communicable illnesses such as AIDS, syphilis, malaria, chicken pox, Chloroquine retinopathy, and Lyme disease as well as hereditary diseases like leukemia, lymphoma, and sickle cell anemia affect the eyes. Pregnancy also affects the eyes. Likewise, indications of chronic health conditions such as congestive heart failure, atherosclerosis, and cholesterol issues first appear in the eyes. Retinal scanning is sometimes confused with iris recognition, which has been employed for a wider scope of applications.

== Pros and cons ==
Advantages

- Low occurrence of false positives
- Extremely low (almost 0%) false negative rates
- Highly reliable because no two people have the same retinal pattern
- Speedy results: Identity of the subject is verified very quickly

Disadvantages

- Measurement accuracy can be affected by a disease such as cataracts
- Measurement accuracy can also be affected by severe astigmatism
- Scanning procedure is perceived by some as invasive
- Subject being scanned must be very close to the camera optics
- High equipment cost

== See also ==
- Vein matching
- Optical Coherence Tomography
- Iris recognition
