= Corruption in Mali =

Corruption in Mali is a critical concern for the African nation as it is now deeply entrenched in the country’s institutions, severely affecting its stability and development. Despite an increase in GDP due to thriving cotton production, extractive activities, and industrial gold production, a significant portion of Mali’s population is mired in extreme poverty and this is partly attributed to corrupt practices.

== Public sector corruption ==
Corruption is particularly pronounced in Mali's public sector ranging from public administration to the armed forces. As a result, the impact is far-reaching. It has undermined effective governance and eroded public trust, all contributing to underdevelopment, social unrest, and an ongoing security crisis. Common corruption cases include bribery, embezzlement, and nepotism.

A recent example of corruption in government procurement was the 2014 scandal involving the purchase of equipment for Mali’s military and a presidential jet. Senior officials were found to have mismanaged funds and purchased huge quantities of armament without any tenders floated beforehand. Reports of this scandal uncovered a broader culture of financial mismanagement in the defense sector.

In May 2021, high-level officials including former Minister of Security and Civilian Protection and former Chief of Staff of the Army, General Moussa M’Bemba Keita, and former Director of Material, Fuel, and Transportation of the Army, General Moustapha Drabo were arrested along with other army officers by the Supreme Court authorities. These officials were accused of misappropriation of public funds, corruption, abuse of influence, and favoritism. The severe corruption within the military directly contributes to the nation's persistent security vulnerabilities.

=== Security crises ===
In 2012, Tuareg launched its fourth uprising and it caused a security crisis. The conflict itself was driven by long-standing grievances that included marginalization, economic neglect, and suppression. There was an inability on the part of the military to effectively counter the uprising on account of corruption, lack of resources, and poor coordination. It then created a power vacuum that has emboldened the activities of armed and jihadist groups.

Exploiting governmental vulnerabilities, armed groups have initiated campaigns to present themselves as viable governance alternatives. Terrorist factions exacerbated the instability, fueling a surge in violence that brought Mali to the verge of civil war. By 2023, violence against civilians increased by 38% and the main perpetrators of these atrocities include state forces, rebels, and armed groups.

== Mining and corruption ==
As the mining industry also became a major source of revenue for Mali, it became vulnerable to corruption. One notable case is the 2014 scandal involving the Société des Mines de Loulo (SOMILO), a subsidiary of Randgold Resources. Investigations revealed that officials had accepted bribes to grant mining permits and concessions, leading to significant financial losses for the country. Mali's mining sector, which is foreign dominated, is also increasingly being scrutinized by the country's military junta. For instance, executives of the Australian gold mining company, Resolute Mining, were arrested and charged with forgery and damage to public property in 2024.

== Health sector ==
The mismanagement of public funds in the health sector was highlighted in 2018 when millions of dollars were misappropriated by officials within the Ministry of Health. It affected the delivery of healthcare services, particularly in rural areas where such services are already scarce. Public outrage and cooperation from international organizations led to the prosecution of the officials involved. This problem was already previously highlighted when several health ministry officials were arrested for fraud involving the misuse of the Global Fund intended for Mali’s tuberculosis and malaria grant. Before the release of the audit, the then health minister abruptly resigned.

Humanitarian aid is also vulnerable to corruption. The ongoing conflict in Mali has continued to displace people. Due to corruption particularly within the security apparatus, humanitarian aid fails to reach refugees and the United Nations has documented many of these incidents. Foreign donors are also taking projects out of the hands of the government due to corruption.

== Organized crime ==
In Mali, there is an intersection between corruption and organized crime. The northern region of the country forms part of the area in West Africa dominated by transnational organized crime. Aside from its role in cocaine trafficking, the region serves as a transit area for migrant trafficking. The United Nations Office on Drugs and Crime identified the city of Gao as a major migrant embarkation point. According to the Global Initiative Against Transnational Organized Crime, state representatives may or may not be acting under the influence of actors and have little incentive in taking part in curbing criminal activities. Reports indicate that government officials are known to be involved in various illegal and illicit activities that include human and drug trafficking.

There is also the case of nonstate armed groups and their activities, which highlights the impact of corruption. An example is the Wagner Group, a paramilitary organization sponsored by Russia that often operates with the Malian Armed Forces. Its operations in Mali have been characterized as a "regime survival package", which entails security provisions for regimes against possible uprisings as well as other security threats such as those posed by jihadist groups. The presence of this private security force has raised corruption concerns in Mali. The lack of transparency and accountability regarding its financial arrangements as well as the lack of military oversight has been noted for creating opportunities for corruption.

The Wagner Group is also implicated in incidents of mass killing and abuse during counterterrorism operations based on reports from the Human Rights Watch and the U.S. State Department. This was demonstrated in the case of the so-called "Moura" incident. According to the Human Rights Watch, Mali armed forces and associated foreign soldiers, who were identified as Russians, executed about 300 civilians in the town of Moura. A Reuters report posted that as many as 500 people were killed. Some of these were suspected Islamist fighters.

== Impact ==
Mali's substantial budget deficit and the state’s lack of capacities have affected the delivery of social safety nets. This is evident in the way the people of Mali are now increasingly relying on a range of non-actors and statutory institutions to access essential public services due to the government’s inability to provide basic services. Corruption has also contributed to the worsening instability and security problems in Mali. Although this variable is just one of the factors that enable persisting conflicts in the country, it has fed grievances and alienation, fueling disputes among certain groups in the country.

It is noted that the frameworks instituted to prevent or address corruption in Mali are not robust enough to withstand corrupt practices and this weakness is exacerbated by weak institutions and inadequate resources. Other reasons for the failure of anti-corruption initiatives include the perception of corruption as insignificant and technical, and not as a political, power-distribution issue.

== International rankings ==
In Transparency International's 2025 Corruption Perceptions Index, Mali scored 28 on a scale from 0 ("highly corrupt") to 100 ("very clean"). When ranked by score, Mali ranked 136th among the 182 countries in the Index, where the country ranked first is perceived to have the most honest public sector. For comparison with regional scores, the best score among sub-Saharan African countries (Note: Angola, Benin, Botswana, Burkina Faso, Burundi, Cameroon, Cape Verde, Central African Republic, Chad, Comoros, Côte d'Ivoire, Democratic Republic of the Congo, Djibouti, Equatorial Guinea, Eritrea, Eswatini, Ethiopia, Gabon, Gambia, Ghana, Guinea, Guinea-Bissau, Kenya, Lesotho, Liberia, Madagascar, Malawi, Mali, Mauritania, Mauritius, Mozambique, Namibia, Niger, Nigeria, Republic of the Congo, Rwanda, Sao Tome and Principe, Senegal, Seychelles, Sierra Leone, Somalia, South Africa, South Sudan, Sudan, Tanzania, Togo, Uganda, Zambia, and Zimbabwe.) was 68, the average was 32 and the worst was 9. For comparison with worldwide scores, the best score was 89 (ranked 1), the average was 42, and the worst was 9 (ranked 181, in a two-way tie).
