= Grigol Liluashvili =

Georgian politician and former security official

- გრიგოლ ლილუაშვილი
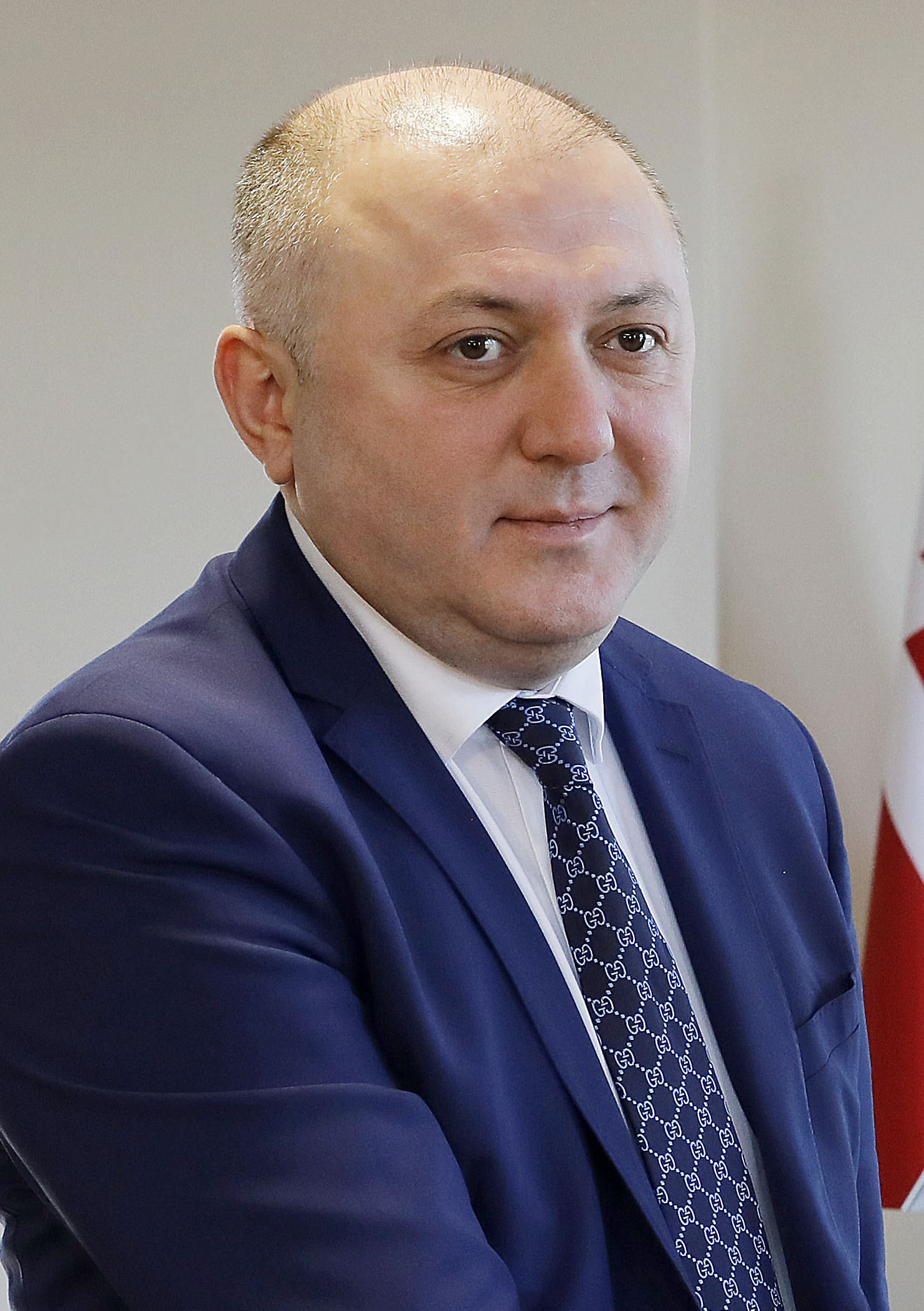

Head of the State Security Service of Georgia
- In office 17 October 2019 – 2 April 2025
- Preceded by: Vakhtang Gomelauri
- Succeeded by: Anri Okhanashvili

Member of the Parliament of Georgia
- In office 18 November 2016 – 22 December 2017
- Constituency: Khoni and Vani

Personal details
- Born: 1 September 1977 (age 49) Kutaisi, Georgian SSR, Soviet Union
- Party: Georgian Dream
- Education: Georgian Technical University

Grigol Liluashvili (Georgian: გრიგოლ ლილუაშვილი; born 1 September 1977) is a former Georgian business executive, politician, and security official. He served as head of the State Security Service of Georgia (SSSG) from October 2019 until April 2025 and was previously a Georgian Dream member of parliament from 2016 to 2017.

Liluashvili worked for companies associated with Georgian Dream founder Bidzina Ivanishvili before entering public office. During his leadership of the SSSG, the agency faced criticism over alleged mass surveillance, insufficient parliamentary oversight and a lack of political neutrality. These controversies occurred amid a wider period of democratic backsliding in Georgia. In 2024, Ukraine imposed sanctions on Liluashvili, while Estonia and Lithuania barred him from entering their countries in connection with the Georgian authorities' response to anti-government protests. After his resignation in April 2025, Liluashvili was arrested in December 2025 and, as of August 2026, was on trial on charges of accepting large bribes. He has pleaded not guilty.

== Early life and business career ==
Liluashvili was born in Kutaisi on 1 September 1977. He graduated from the Georgian Technical University, where he studied international economic relations.

After working in the aviation sector and for Georgia's customs administration, he held senior positions in several companies connected to Bidzina Ivanishvili's Cartu business group. From 2015 to 2016, he was general director and chair of the supervisory board of Cartu Group and chair of the supervisory board of Cartu Bank.

== Political and security-service career ==
Under the Georgian Dream government, Liluashvili served as a deputy mayor of Tbilisi for part of 2016. In that year's parliamentary election he was elected as Georgian Dream's majoritarian representative for the Khoni and Vani constituency. He chaired Parliament's Regional Policy and Self-Government Committee until resigning his seat on 22 December 2017 to become a deputy head of the SSSG.

After Vakhtang Gomelauri became interior minister, the government nominated Liluashvili to succeed him as head of the SSSG. Parliament confirmed the appointment on 17 October 2019 by 85 votes to 8, for a six-year term.

=== Tenure as security-service head ===
During Liluashvili's tenure, the SSSG continued to identify Russia's presence in Abkhazia and South Ossetia as the principal threat to Georgia's national security. Its reporting also increasingly focused on alleged domestic destabilization, coup and assassination plots, and hostile influence by Western actors. The agency's report covering 2024 accused actors in “certain Western countries” of disinformation and discussed an alleged plan to "liquidate" Georgian Dream leaders. Georgian civil-society organizations accused the service of using national-security rhetoric to advance the ruling party's political interests.

In September 2021, thousands of files purportedly originating from the SSSG were leaked to the media. They appeared to document extensive surveillance of clergy, journalists, opposition, civil-society figures, and foreign diplomats. The authenticity of the complete cache was not officially established, although several people named in the files said that accounts of their conversations were accurate. A group of ambassadors said that the reported monitoring of diplomats raised "grave concerns" and, if established, would constitute a serious breach of the Vienna Convention on Diplomatic Relations. Liluashvili rejected demands that he resign and described the leak as a possible provocation. The SSSG and the government denied unlawful surveillance.

In May 2022 five Georgian watchdog organizations said that the prosecution service's investigation of the leak had been ineffective and that potential victims had been denied meaningful access to the proceedings. The European Commission reported in 2024 that parliamentary oversight of Georgia's security services remained limited and that the investigation had produced no prosecutions. The United States Department of State likewise reported concerns from civil society, journalists, and international observers about the SSSG's surveillance system, weak oversight, and lack of political neutrality.

=== International sanctions and entry restrictions ===
On 5 December 2024, Ukraine included Liluashvili among 19 Georgian officials and political figures subjected to sanctions following the Georgian government's suspension of its European Union accession bid and the violent dispersal of pro-European demonstrations.

Estonia and Lithuania added Liluashvili to their national restriction lists on 15 December 2024. Estonia imposed an entry ban as part of measures against senior Georgian officials whom it said were connected to violence against protesters, journalists and opposition leaders and to the undermining of democracy. Lithuania's foreign minister said its coordinated restrictions responded to “violence and oppression” against peaceful protesters, journalists and the opposition.

=== Departure from office ===
On 2 April 2025, Prime Minister Irakli Kobakhidze announced that Liluashvili would leave the SSSG several months before the end of his term and become minister of a newly created Ministry of Regional Development. Two days later, Kobakhidze withdrew the proposed appointment, saying that he and Liluashvili had disagreed over the ministry's operating principles and personnel policy. Anri Okhanashvili succeeded him as head of the security service.

== Criminal proceedings ==
On 17 October 2025, investigators searched Liluashvili's home alongside those of former prime minister Irakli Garibashvili and former prosecutor general Otar Partskhaladze as part of several criminal investigations. Prosecutors arrested Liluashvili on 23 December 2025 and charged him under Article 338 of Georgia's Criminal Code with accepting particularly large bribes as part of a group acting by prior agreement. The offences carry a possible sentence of 11 to 15 years' imprisonment.

The prosecution alleged four groups of offences: receipt of US$1 million from a Turkish investor in return for lobbying for a wind-power memorandum; receipt of 1.5 million lari for assistance with gasification tenders; receipt of approximately US$1.365 million for protecting fraudulent call centers between 2021 and 2023; and protection of an official implicated in kickbacks from Tbilisi kindergarten procurement. Liluashvili denied all charges. His lawyers said that he had never taken bribes and disputed the credibility and corroboration of prosecution witnesses.

In July 2026, Liluashvili's cousin Andria Liluashvili was sentenced to 12 years in prison for bribery, facilitating bribe-taking and large-scale money laundering in connection with the scam call-center scheme. Prosecutors said he had served as an intermediary for payments allegedly made to Grigol Liluashvili; the judgment did not determine Grigol Liluashvili's guilt in his separate trial.

On 16 September 2026, Grigol Liluashvili was sentenced to 13 years in prison for four counts of bribery and abuse of office stemming from multiple high-profile corruption schemes during his tenure as head of the SSSG. Tbilisi City Court Judge Nino Tarashvili found him guilty of accepting a $1 million bribe from a Turkish investor to facilitate a wind power agreement, receiving ₾1.5 million from a Georgian businessman to influence state gasification tenders, taking $1.365 million through a relative to shield an illegal scam call center network, and abusing his position to protect former Tbilisi preschool agency chief Kakhaber Gvantseladze from procurement kickback investigations.
