= Digital Insight =

US software company

- Founded: July 1995; 31 years ago
- Founder: Paul Fiore; Daniel Jacoby
- Fate: Acquired by NCR Corporation in 2014; divested to Veritas Capital in 2024 and now part of Candescent
- Headquarters: Redwood City, California
- Parent: Candescent

Digital Insight was an American provider of online banking software for banks and credit unions, headquartered in California. Founded in 1995 by Paul Fiore and Daniel Jacoby, the company grew rapidly during the late 1990s, went public during the dot-com boom in 1999, and expanded through a series of acquisitions. In 2007, it was purchased by Intuit and rebranded as Intuit Financial Services. The business was later sold to private equity firm Thoma Bravo in 2013, restored to the Digital Insight name, and acquired by NCR Corporation in 2014 as part of its digital banking division. In August 2024, NCR Voyix agreed to sell the division to Veritas Capital, after which it became part of Candescent.

== History ==
The company was founded in July 1995 by Paul Fiore and Daniel Jacoby.

In February 1996, the company raised $1.1 million in seed money from the founders' former employer, XP Systems, and received its first client, Community Credit Union, of Plano, Texas.

The company had $85,000 in revenue in its first six months. Revenue jumped to $1.5 million in 1996 and to $4.1 million in 1997, and to $8.2 million in 1998.

In April 1997, the company raised $6 million from Menlo Ventures.

In September 1997, the company acquired RJE Internet Services, a developer of bank websites.

In March 1998, the company raised $3 million from Menlo Ventures and $5 million from HarbourVest Partners.

In October 1998, John Dorman became CEO of the company.

On October 1, 1999, during the dot-com bubble, the company became a public company via an initial public offering. After pricing at $15 per share, the stock rose to $32 per share on its first day of trading, up 114%.

In February 2000, the company acquired nFront.

In April 2000, the company acquired 1View Network.

In July 2000, the company acquired AnyTime Access for $140 million.

In February 2002, the company acquired Virtual FinancialServices for $51 million.

In October 2003, the company acquired Magnet Communications for $33.5 million in cash and 1.45 million shares of Digital Insight common stock (valued at approximately $34.6 million at the time the acquisition was completed).

Also in October 2003, Jeffrey Stiefler was named CEO of the company.

On February 7, 2007, Intuit acquired the company for $1.35 billion.

In October 2008, the company introduced the consumer version of FinanceWorks and in December 2008, the small business version was launched.

In September 2013, John O’Malley was named CEO of the company.

On August 1, 2013 Thoma Bravo acquired Intuit Financial Services for $1.025 billion.

On January 10, 2014, NCR Corporation acquired the company for $1.65 billion.

In 2015, the company integrated EyeVerify's eye vein recognition technology, called Eyeprint ID, into its mobile banking platforms.

On August 6, 2024, NCR Voyix entered an agreement to sell their digital banking platform to Veritas Capital for $2.45 billion.

On September 30, 2024, the sale was completed and the business was rebranded as Candescent, operating as a privately held company under Veritas Capital ownership.

== Acquisitions ==
- September 1997 - RJE Internet Services
- February 2000 - nFront
- April 2000 - 1View Network
- July 2000 - AnyTime Access
- February 2002 - Virtual FinancialServices
- October 2003 - Magnet Communications
