= FinanceWorks =

Financial management application

- Developer: Digital Insight
- Release: 2008
- Final release: 2016
- Type: Financial management
- Website: ofm.financeworks.com at the Wayback Machine (archived 2010-04-24)

FinanceWorks was a financial management software tool developed by the financial technology company Digital Insight for distribution by banks to its clients.

The software was designed to help consumers and small businesses manage their finances by offering a platform that allowed users to track spending, create budgets, monitor investments, and manage bills and other expenses. The software was discontinued in 2016 after the company that developed it was acquired.

== History ==
Digital Insight developed FinanceWorks in response to the growing demand for financial management software. The software was first introduced in 2008 and was initially offered as a free service to users of online banking platforms. Later, Digital Insight began offering the software as a standalone product.

In 2000, Digital Insight was acquired by Intuit, a financial software company based in California. As part of the acquisition, Intuit integrated FinanceWorks into its suite of financial management tools, which also included TurboTax and QuickBooks.

In 2016, Intuit announced that it would be discontinuing FinanceWorks and would be focusing on its other financial management tools. The company encouraged users to switch to its other products, such as Mint and Quicken.

== Features ==
FinanceWorks provided users with a variety of features to help them manage their finances. These features included:

1. Account Aggregation: FinanceWorks allowed users to aggregate all their financial accounts in one place. This included bank accounts, credit cards, loans, and investment accounts.
2. Budgeting: The software provided users with a tool for creating and tracking budgets. Users could create monthly or yearly budgets for different categories, such as food, rent, utilities, and entertainment.
3. Spending Tracker: The software also enabled users to track their spending in real-time. Users could view their spending by category and can set alerts to notify them when they exceed their budget.
4. Investment Monitoring: FinanceWorks allowed users to monitor their investments in real-time. Users could view the performance of their investments, create custom portfolios, and set alerts for changes in market conditions.
5. Bill Payment: The software also provides users with a tool for managing their bills. Users can schedule payments, view payment history, and set up automatic payments for recurring bills.

== Reception ==
FinanceWorks received positive reviews from users and critics alike. The software was praised for its ease of use, comprehensive feature set, and ability to aggregate financial accounts in one place.

Critics noted that the software lacked some of the more advanced features of other financial management tools, such as investment analysis and tax planning. However, for many users, the software provided a convenient and effective way to manage their finances.

Although the software was discontinued in 2016, it was well received by users and critics during its lifespan.

== Recognition ==
- Javelin Strategy & Research: "Best in class" for online financial management "[FinanceWorks] sets the standard for rivals to match.… One would expect an Intuit company to excel at providing user-friendly, practical personal finance management tools – and Digital Insight does not disappoint."
- BankInnovation.net: "Best Technology" winner in BankInnovation Awards of 2009.

== Missing features ==
- FinanceWorks did not offer the ability to import transactions, create subcategories, pay bills, transfer money, or reconcile accounts.
