= Solange Ghernaouti =

Swiss academic, international expert in cybersecurity and cyber defence

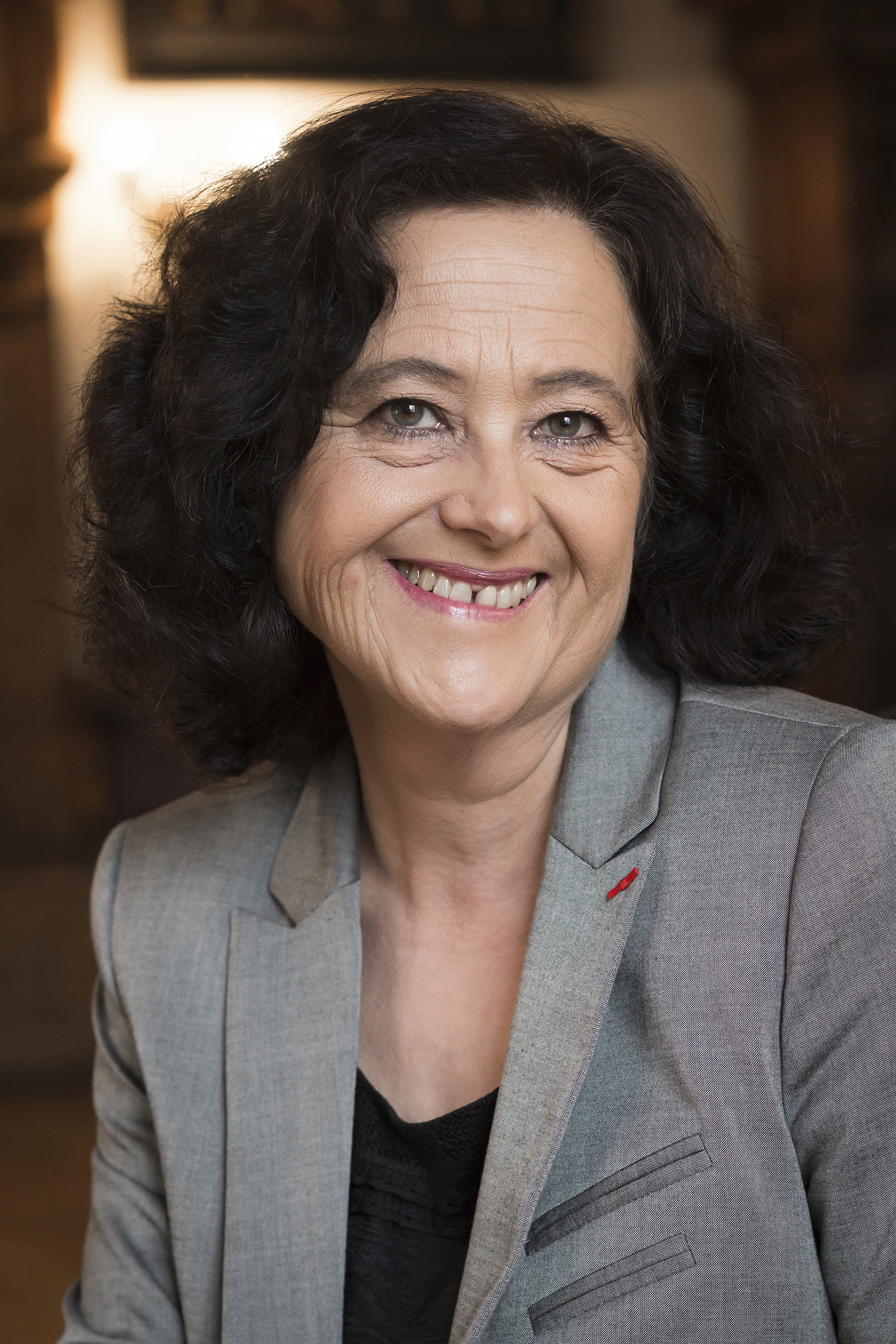
- Ghernaouti in 2015
- Born: 5 December 1958 (age 67); Blida, Algeria
- Citizenship: Switzerland; France
- Education: Pierre-and-Marie-Curie University (PhD in Computer Science, 1986)
- Scientific career
- Fields: Cybersecurity; cyberstrategy
- Workplaces: University of Lausanne (UNIL)
- Website: www.scarg.org

Solange Ghernaouti is a professor at the University of Lausanne (UNIL) and an international expert on cybersecurity and cyberdefence. She regularly collaborates with various United Nations, European and government institutions as well as with private corporations.

Solange Ghernaouti was the first woman professor at the HEC Lausanne faculty in 1987 and heads the Swiss Cybersecurity Advisory and Research Group (SCARG) that she created, and the Complexity Sciences Research Group. She obtained her PhD in Computer Science and Telecommunications at the Pierre-and-Marie-Curie University (later merged into Sorbonne University) under the supervision of professor Guy Pujolle. She is a former auditor of the Institut des Hautes Études de Défense Nationale, a member of the Swiss Academy of Technical Sciences (SATW) and a member of the Swiss Commission for UNESCO.

She is the author of numerous technical and popular books and scientific publications on the subjects of telecommunications, the control of computer risks, computer crime and cyberpower and digital humanities. Since 2018, she has regularly kept a blog on the Le Temps newspaper website where she publishes various articles about cybersecurity and the impact of digital and artificial intelligence on society.

A technico-economic and political prospective analyst, she regularly appears in the media (RTS, France Culture, RTBF and RFI, among others) and gives conferences on the five continents.

Solange Ghernaouti was also president of various associations such as the Erna Hamburger Foundation from 2012 to 2017 as well as the Social Commission of the University of Lausanne from 2006 to 2016.

In 2020, she published fables of the digital era as well as highly noticed articles on the Swiss contact tracing application.

== Distinctions ==
- Ranked among the 100 people who make digital in Switzerland, category researchers - Digital Shapers by Le Temps (September 27, 2018)
- Her book La cybercriminalité, les nouvelles armes du pouvoir (Presses Polytechniques et Universitaires Romandes) received the prize for the best book "Cybercriminalité" at the International Forum on Cybersecurity (23 January 2018).
- Former auditor of the IHEDN (decree of 8 January 2014)
- Knight of the Order of the Legion of Honour (decree of 31 December 2013)
- Reserve Lieutenant-Colonel in the French national gendarmerie (2012 - 2017)
- Member of the Swiss Academy of Technical Sciences (since 2013)
- Ranked among the 20 women that make Switzerland by Bilan (2012)
- Ranked among the 100 most powerful women in Switzerland by the magazine Women in Business (2012)
- Ranked among the 100 public figures that make Swiss Romandie by l'Hebdo (2011)
- Ranked among the 300 most influential figures in Switzerland by Bilan (22 June 2011)

== Miscellaneous ==
- President of the SGH Foundation (since 2018)
- Guest 2018 of the David-Constant Chair of the University of Liège
- Member of the Committee Rencontres du 7^{ème} Art of Lausanne (since 2018)
- Member of Association des réservistes du chiffre de la sécurité de l’information
- Member of the Board of the NGO "Global Initiative Against Transnational Organized Crime" (since 2017)
- Portraitized by for the Lipstick Leaders exhibition in Zurich (2018) by the artist Daniel Eisenhu
- Actor in the play "The Robot Who Loved Me"
- Permanent exhibition of the Museum of Communication Bern on the protection of privacy
- Associate Fellow of the Geneva Centre for Security Policy
- Member of the scientific committee of the International Forum on Technology and Security (since 2015)
- Partner to the European projects E-Crime and Prismacloud (since respectively 2014 and 2015)
- President of the Social Commission of the University of Lausanne (2006–2016)
- President of the Erna Hamburger foundation (2012–2017)
- Work Area leader « Capacity Building », Global Cybersecurity Agenda, ITU (2007–2008)
- Supervisor of the thesis of Lambert Sonna Momo
- President of the Gender Equality Commission (2005 - 2011) and previously Member of the Equality Delegation and of the Women's Affairs Commission of the University of Lausanne (1989 - 2004)
- Partner to the European project SECOQC (2004–2008)
- Co-founder in 2001 of the first inter-faculty and interdisciplinary teaching program at the University of Lausanne, DEA "Law, Crime and Security of New Technologies", transformed into a master's degree in law, Crime and Information Technology Security in 2006, which she directed at its launch.

== Main books ==
- S. Ghernaouti, Cybersécurité, analyser les risques, mettre en œuvre les solutions, 6^{ème} édition, Dunod, 2019
- S. Ghernaouti, Guide pratique de la cybersécurité et de la cyberdéfense, Organisation internationale de la francophonie, 2017
- S. Ghernaouti, La cybercriminalité: Les nouvelles armes de pouvoir, 2nd edition, EPFL Press, 2017
- S. Ghernaouti, Sécurité informatique et réseaux, 5th edition, Dunod 2016 (first edition 2006)
- S. Ghernaouti, CYBERPOWER: Crime, Conflict and Security in Cyberspace, EPFL Press 2013 (Translated in Chinese and published in Peking University Press, 2018.
- S. Ghernaouti & A. Dufour, “Internet” – Que sais-je ?, 11th edition, Presses universitaires de France 2012
- I. Tashi & S. Ghernaouti-Hélie, Information security evaluation : a holistic approach, EPFL Press 2011
- S. Ghernaouti, A Global Treaty on Cybersecurity and Cybercrime: A Contribution for Peace, Justice and Security in Cyberspace, 2nd edition, Cybercrimedata 2011 (first edition 2009)
- R. Berger & S. Ghernaouti-Hélie, Technocivilisation : pour une philosophie du numérique, Focus Sciences, PPUR 2010
- S. Ghernaouti, Cybersecurity Guide for Developing Countries, 3rd edition revised and expanded, ITU 2009 (first edition 2006)
- S. Ghernaouti, Stratégie et ingénierie de la sécurité des réseaux, InterEditions 1998
- S. Ghernaouti & A. Dufour, Enterprise Networks and Telephony from technologies to business strategy, Springer-Verlag 1998
- C. Servin & S. Ghernaouti, Les hauts débits en télécoms, InterEditions 1998
- S. Ghernaouti & A. Dufour, Réseaux locaux et téléphonie, Masson 1995
- S. Ghernaouti, CLIENT / SERVEUR. Les outils du traitement, Réparti coopératif, Masson 1993
- S. Ghernaouti, Réseaux, applications réparties normalisées, Eyrolles 1990
