= EyeVerify =

Biometric security company

- Company type: Private
- Industry: Biometrics
- Founded: 2012
- Founder: Toby Rush
- Headquarters: Kansas City, Missouri
- Key people: CEO/Founder Toby Rush CFO Tom Jantsch; Chief Scientist Reza Derakhshani; VP Engineering Jeremy Paben EVP Global Sales & Marketing Chris Barnett
- Parent: Ant Group
- Website: http://eyeverify.com/

EyeVerify, Inc. is a biometric security technology company based in Kansas City, Missouri owned by Ant Group. Its chief product, Eyeprint ID, provides verification using eye veins and other micro-features in and around the eye. Images of the human eye are used to authenticate mobile device users. EyeVerify licenses its software for use in mobile banking applications, such as those offered by Tangerine Bank, NCR/Digital Insight and Wells Fargo.

== About ==
EyeVerify is part of the Kansas City Crossroads neighborhood alongside several other tech companies. EyeVerify's flagship product is Eyeprint ID, a system that authenticates users by recognizing patterns of blood vessels visible in the sclera, the whites of the eyes, as well as other eye-based micro-features.

An independent assessment by iBeta determined that Eyeprint ID meets the requirements for inclusion as a built-in subsystem in an Electronic Prescription of Controlled Substance (EPCS) Application.

== History ==
Entrepreneur Toby Rush founded the company in 2012, some months after visiting the lab of University of Missouri-Kansas City professor Reza Derakhshani, who developed the eye vein verification technology. Derakhshani holds the patent to Eyeprint ID and now serves as the company's chief science officer.

In September 2016, EyeVerify was acquired by Ant Group for $100 million.

== Investors ==
In September 2016, Ant Group, the financial services arm of Alibaba Group, acquired EyeVerify for an estimated $100M.

Prior to that, Wells Fargo, Sprint, Qihoo 360 and Samsung Electronics had invested more than $6 million in EyeVerify. Mid-America Angels and Nebraska Angels were also investors.

The company was an early participant in the Wells Fargo Startup Accelerator for innovators in mobile security.

== Partners/customers ==
=== Financial services ===
In April 2016, Tangerine Bank became the first Canadian financial institution to offer Eyeprint ID. The same month, Wells Fargo discussed its summer 2016 implementation of Eyeprint ID with the Wall Street Journal. The large bank mentioned that it had "tested voice and facial recognition technologies but found that each was subject to vagaries in the environment," and that "Eyeprint ID works correctly more often and is more discrete."

In October 2015, RSA Security added Eyeprint ID to its Adaptive Authentication Software Development Kit, after extensive evaluation of the technology, to provide in-app biometric step up authentication for high risk login and transactions.

EyeVerify and Olcsan CAD announced a partnership to offer Eyeprint ID to institutions in Turkey and other European countries. Their first project was to integrate with Vodafone Turkey's mobile wallet, Vodafone Cep Cuzdan.

Mountain America Credit Union conducted a beta launch of Eyeprint ID as part of its dual biometric authentication system, making it the first financial institution officially to launch Eyeprint ID in the United States.

Digital Insight, a division of NCR, announced in February 2015 that it would incorporate Eyeprint ID into its mobile banking platform. As of October 30, 2015, five Digital Insight Financial Institutions use Eyeprint ID in their mobile banking app: Service Credit Union, Arizona Federal Credit Union, Community America Credit Union, First Internet Bank and Evansville Teachers Federal Credit Union. By the end of 2016, dozens of Digital Insight credit unions had launched Eyeprint ID.

EyeVerify also has partnerships with other technology companies that serve the financial services industry, including Comarch, Hypr and BioConnect.

== Spoofing and liveness detection ==
On 29 September 2015, a YouTube video was posted by an associate of eyeThenticate (at the time of posting) demonstrating a spoof of Eyeprint ID using version 2.3.6 of the demo application. The Play Store app description has been updated to clarify that the demo application "includes limited liveness detection only, and spoofing tests conducted on this app will not be relevant to the product sold through EyeVerify partners". The version of Eyeprint ID that is integrated by partners has liveness detection built in to prevent spoofing attempts.

== Recognition & awards ==
- 2013, Get in the Ring U.S. and international winner
- 2014, "Rookie of the Year" and "Technology Innovation," Compass Intelligence Mobility Awards
- 2015, 2015 "Cool Vendor" in Mobile and Wireless, Gartner
- 2016, "Best of Show" at FinovateEurope.
- 2016, "Best of Show at FinovateAsia.
