= Vein matching =

Technique of biometric identification

Vein matching, also called vascular technology, is a technique of biometric identification through the analysis of the patterns of blood vessels visible from the surface of the skin. Though used by the Federal Bureau of Investigation and the Central Intelligence Agency, this method of identification is still in development and has not yet been universally adopted by crime labs as it is not considered as reliable as more established techniques, such as fingerprinting. However, it can be used in conjunction with existing forensic data in support of a conclusion.

While other types of biometric scanners are more widely employed in security systems, vascular scanners are growing in popularity. Fingerprint scanners are more frequently used, but they generally do not provide enough data points for critical verification decisions. Since fingerprint scanners require direct contact of the finger with the scanner, dry or abraded skin can interfere with the reliability of the system. Skin diseases, such as psoriasis, can also limit the accuracy of the scanner, not to mention direct contact with the scanner can result in need for more frequent cleaning and higher risk of equipment damage. On the other hand, vascular scanners do not require contact with the scanner, and since the information they read is on the inside of the body, skin conditions do not affect the accuracy of the reading. Vascular scanners also work very quickly, scanning in less than a second. As they scan, they capture the unique pattern formed by veins as they branch through the hand. The retinal scanner is more reliable than the vascular scanner, but is less widely used because of its intrusive nature. People generally are uncomfortable exposing their eyes to an unfamiliar source of light, and retinal scanners are more difficult to install than vascular scanning equipment, since variations in angle of height and face in relation to the device must be accounted for.

== History ==
Joe Rice, an automation controls engineer at Kodak's Annesley factory, invented vein pattern recognition in the early 1980s in response to his bank cards and identity being stolen. He developed what was essentially a barcode reader for use on the human body and assigned the rights to the UK's NRDC (National Research Development Corporation). The NRDC/ BTG (Thatcher privatised NRDC into BTG) made little headway in licensing vein pattern technology. The world was wedded to fingerprints and Iris patterns and governments (the main buyers of biometric solutions) wanted open view biometrics for surveillance purposes, not a hidden, personal biometric solution.

In the late 1990s BTG said they were dropping vein patterns through no commercial interest. Rice was unhappy with the BTG's decision and their implementation of vein pattern technology so he gave a talk at the Biometric Summit in Washington DC, on how he would develop vein pattern recognition. This view was countered by a following speaker from IBG (The US based international Biometric Group) who said there was insufficient information content in vein patterns for them to be used as a viable biometric.

In 2002 Hitachi and Fujitsu launched vein biometric products and veins have turned out to be one of the most consistent, discriminatory and accurate biometric traits. In the mid-2000s, Rice received an invitation from Matthias Vanoni to partner in a Swiss company, Biowatch SA, to develop and commercialise the biowatch.

== Commercial applications ==
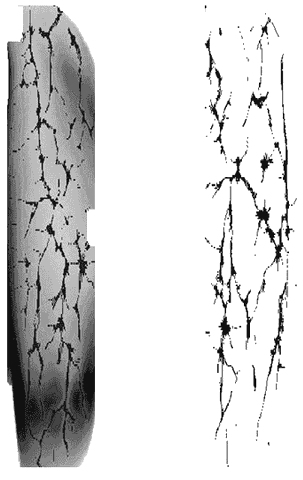
Finger vein scanned

Vascular/vein pattern recognition (VPR) technology has been developed commercially by Hitachi since 1997, in which infrared light absorbed by the hemoglobin in a subject's blood vessels is recorded (as dark patterns) by a CCD camera behind a transparent surface. The data patterns are processed, compressed, and digitized for future biometric authentication of the subject. Computer security expert Bruce Schneier stated that a key advantage of vein patterns for biometric identification is the lack of a known method of forging a usable "dummy", as is possible with fingerprints.

Blood vessel patterns are unique to each individual, as are other biometric data such as fingerprint recognition or the patterns of the iris. Unlike some biometric systems, blood vessel patterns are almost impossible to counterfeit because they are located beneath the skin's surface. Biometric systems based on fingerprints can be fooled with a dummy finger fitted with a copied fingerprint; voice and facial characteristic-based systems can be fooled by recordings and high-resolution images. The finger vein identification system is much harder to fool because it can only authenticate the finger of a living person.

=== Finger vein recognition ===
Finger vein recognition is based on images of human finger vein patterns beneath the skin's surface. The technology is currently in use or development for a wide variety of applications, including credit card authentication, automobile security, employee time and attendance tracking, computer and network authentication, end point security and automated teller machines.

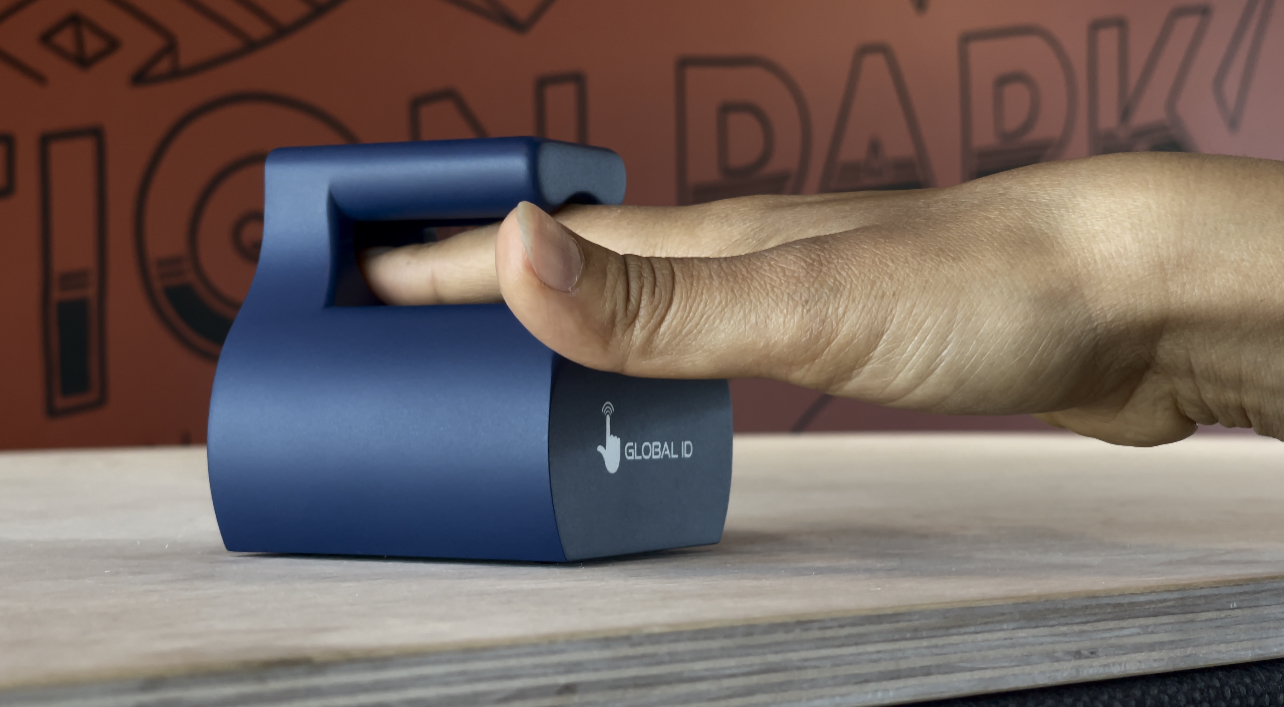
Multi-View Finger Vein biometric scanner

To obtain the pattern for the database record, an individual inserts a finger into an attester terminal containing a near-infrared light-emitting diode (LED) light and a monochrome charge-coupled device (CCD) camera. The hemoglobin in the blood absorbs near-infrared LED light, which makes the vein system appear as a dark pattern of lines. The camera records the image and the raw data is digitized, certified, and sent to a database of registered images. For authentication purposes, the finger is scanned as before and the data is sent to the database of registered images for comparison. The authentication process takes less than two seconds.

Finger scanning devices have been deployed for use in Japanese financial institutions, kiosks, and turnstiles. Mantra Softech marketed a device in India that scans vein patterns in palms for attendance recording. Fujitsu developed a version that does not require direct physical contact with the vein scanner for improved hygiene in the use of electronic point of sale devices.
Lambert Sonna Momo developed in 2020 a new generation of scanner, the VenoScannerF, which scans finger veins in multiple views and extracts a key that is encrypted from end to end with a constantly changing random code. It is developing a new floating-hand version available for the market in 2022.

== Palm vein biometrics key generation ==
Palm vein authentication is one of the vascular pattern authentication technologies. Fujitsu offers contactless authentication and provides a hygienic and non-invasive solution so that it could be used for contactless authentication like laptop, mobile or even an ATM. When compared to other vascular pattern recognition, the Palm vein plays a predominant role since it has a wide region of interest, while other similar technologies like eye Eye vein verification, finger vein has a very small RoI comparatively. Also, compared to other biometric recognition, palm vein does not include any noise data like hair, electrical/thermal/environmental conditions, or even sensor drift. Since a huge area of interest is available, even an irrevocable biometric key is proposed by Prasanalakshmi to be generated from the bifurcations and minutiae patterns. The points of these patterns, in turn, are used to generate a key that protects data in smart cards, devices, and many others. The Palm vein biometric key generation is thus an "irrevocable cryptographic key from the biometric template" used for smart card/device authentication.

== Forensic identification ==
According to a 31,000-word investigative report published in January 2011 by Georgetown University faculty and students, U.S. federal investigators used photos from the video recording of the beheading of American journalist Daniel Pearl to match the veins on the visible areas of the perpetrator to that of captured al-Qaeda operative Khalid Sheikh Mohammed, notably a "bulging vein" running across his hand. The FBI and the CIA used the matching technique on Mohammed in 2004 and again in 2007. Officials were concerned that his confession, which had been obtained through torture (namely waterboarding), would not hold up in court and used vein matching evidence to bolster their case.

== Other applications ==
Some US hospitals, such as NYU Langone Medical Center, use a vein matching system called Imprivata PatientSecure, primarily to reduce errors. Additional benefits include identifying unconscious or uncommunicative patients, and saving time and paperwork. Dr. Bernard A. Birnbaum, chief of hospital operations at Langone, says "vein patterns are 100 times more unique than fingerprints". However, news reports on the use of vein matching for Mr. Pearl's murderer quote experts who say "that its reliability as a forensic identification tool is unproven.

== See also ==
- Eye vein verification
