= Dorsa Derakhshani =

Iranian-American chess player (born 1998)

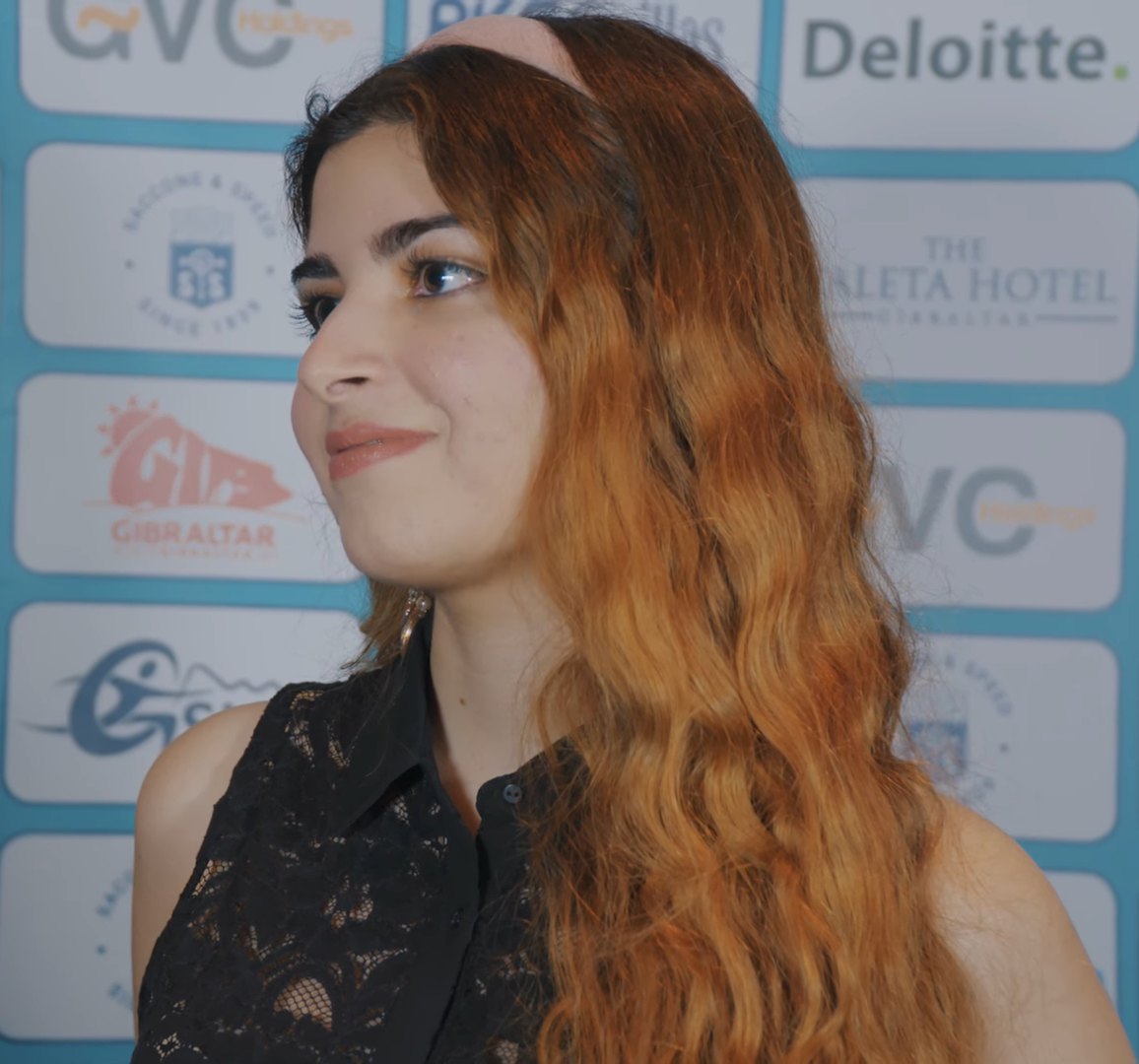
- Derakhshani in 2017

Personal information
- Born: 15 April 1998 (age 28) Tehran, Iran

Chess career
- Country: Iran (until 2017); United States (since 2017)
- Title: International Master (2016); Woman Grandmaster (2016)
- Peak rating: 2405 (July 2016)

Dorsa Derakhshani (Persian: درسا درخشانی; born 1998) is an Iranian-American chess player. She was awarded the titles Woman Grandmaster and International Master in 2016.

== Chess career ==
Derakhshani won three gold medals at the Asian Youth Chess Championships in 2012 (in the Girls U14 division), 2013 and 2014 (in the Girls U16). She played for the Iranian National team in the women's division of the Asian Nations Cup in 2012 and 2014.

Derakhshani also qualified for the title of FIDE Trainer in 2016 and is an accredited FIDE journalist.

Derakhshani spoke at TedxTalk in Munich, Germany, in July 2019. In her talk she advised the audience to "Take their freedom of choice seriously."

=== Conflict with Iranian Chess Federation ===
In February 2017, the Iranian Chess Federation banned Derakhshani from playing for the Iran national team or playing in any tournaments in Iran on the grounds of "national interests" after she played in the 2017 Gibraltar Chess Festival (when she was already a temporary resident of Spain) without wearing a hijab. Her 15-year-old brother Borna, who is a FIDE Master, was also banned for playing Israeli grandmaster Alexander Huzman in the first round of the same tournament. Derakhshani had previously played in several tournaments without a hijab. Derakhshani gave only one interview in response to the media attention, to Chess.com. She also wrote a piece for The New York Times at the end of 2017.

=== Career in the United States ===
Following the ban, Derakhshani was accepted as a student at Saint Louis University to study biology on a pre-med track, winning a scholarship to play on the Saint Louis University Chess Team and taking up the role of SLU Woman Team Captain (2019–2022). Because of this, Derakhshani began to play for the United States of America in 2017. The Saint Louis chess team won silver in the 2017 Pan American intercollegiate chess championship. She competed in the 2018 US Women's Chess Championship. In 2019, she accompanied her team to achieve bronze in the World Prestigious University Chess Invitational in Tianjin, China, and she individually achieved the first runner-up on board three in the tournament. She finished third in the 2020 US Women's Championship. Since starting medical school at University Of Missouri in 2022, she has been representing Mizzou Chess Team.

Derakhshani's peak rating was 2405 in July 2016.

== Education ==
Derakhshani graduated summa cum laude from St. Louis University in 2022, majoring in biology and clinical health science. She is currently a medical student at University of Missouri School of Medicine and intends to continue playing and teaching chess while training to be a doctor.
