= Scam call centers in Georgia =

Fraudulent investment call-center operations linked to Georgia

Scam call centers in Georgia are fraudulent telemarketing operations based wholly or partly in the country of Georgia that have targeted people abroad, principally through fictitious online investments. Operators posing as brokers or financial advisers have directed victims to fraudulent trading platforms and persuaded them to transfer money or cryptocurrency. The centers have belonged to several networks with different organizers, corporate structures, and international connections.

Georgian-based centers formed parts of wider criminal systems operating across Israel, Ukraine and several European countries. From 2021 onward, Georgian authorities participated in a series of multinational investigations coordinated by Eurojust and Europol. The subject also became politically controversial within Georgia, as the ruling Georgian Dream party government and opposition figures accused one another's associates of financing or protecting fraudulent operations. Some allegations later formed part of criminal proceedings against former senior officials, while others remained unconfirmed or disputed.

== Methods ==
The centers generally employed a form of boiler-room investment fraud. Online advertisements—sometimes using fabricated news reports, unauthorized celebrity endorsements or deepfake videos—invited users to provide contact details and make a small initial deposit. Call-center employees using false names and concealed telephone numbers then presented themselves as financial advisers. Receptive victims were transferred to more experienced "retention agents", whose task was to build trust and obtain progressively larger payments.

Fraudulent websites displayed invented gains from shares, foreign exchange, commodities, binary options or cryptocurrency. When victims attempted to withdraw funds, operators demanded supposed taxes and commissions, blocked their accounts or ended contact. Some victims were later targeted by a secondary scam promising recovery of the lost money. The proceeds were transferred through bank accounts, payment processors, shell companies and cryptocurrency wallets in several jurisdictions before being integrated into the legitimate economy.

== History ==
=== Emergence and international networks ===
The first extensive international reporting on Georgian-linked operations appeared in 2020. The Organized Crime and Corruption Reporting Project (OCCRP) connected a Tbilisi company, Morgan Limited, with the so-called Milton Group, a network of call centers and investment brands active in Ukraine, Albania and other countries. The investigation described overlapping personnel, companies and payment infrastructure rather than a single formally constituted organization.

In October 2021, German, Georgian and Israeli authorities carried out coordinated operations against a network using at least 18 online trading platforms. Eleven suspects were arrested in Georgia and Israel, and property, vehicles, cash and communications equipment were seized. Eurojust stated that the operation had caused losses of at least tens of millions of euros. Georgian prosecutors reported further arrests in February 2022 and said that the investigated schemes had laundered tens of millions of Georgian lari.

The enforcement campaign expanded in November 2022, when five call centers in Georgia were searched during a multinational operation covering Albania, Georgia, North Macedonia and Ukraine. Across the participating countries, 15 centers were searched and more than 500 electronic devices were seized. Eurojust estimated that the network, which used hundreds of trading platforms, had caused losses of approximately €50 million per quarter. A related action in 2023 involved investigators from Germany, Bulgaria, Romania, Georgia and Israel and concerned a platform associated with approximately 33,000 victims and losses estimated at €89 million.

=== 2023–2024 investigations ===
A separate Swiss-led investigation, begun after a victim's complaint in 2019, identified fraudulent trading websites and call centers in Ukraine and later Georgia. Coordinated measures eventually extended to more than 20 countries. Eurojust reported that the operators used over 100 websites and that predominantly Swiss and German victims had lost at least several million euros. Searches in Tbilisi in 2023 and 2024 resulted in seven arrests and the freezing of assets worth nearly GEL 5 million.

In September 2024, Georgian prosecutors announced another case concerning Morgan Limited. They alleged that the group had defrauded German, Slovenian and Slovak citizens of approximately €3.17 million between 2019 and 2021. Prosecutors also alleged that a manager had transferred more than US$1 million to accounts belonging to former defence minister Davit Kezerashvili and two relatives. Kezerashvili was not charged in the announced case and denied involvement, describing the allegations as politically motivated.

=== 2025 Scam Empire investigation ===
The scale and internal organization of the industry became more widely documented through the March 2025 Scam Empire investigation by OCCRP, Sveriges Television and more than 30 media partners. Based on approximately 1.9 terabytes of leaked data, the investigation examined two separate operations: one based in Georgia and another operating from Israel and several European countries. Their records indicated that at least 32,000 people had transferred approximately US$275 million between 2021 and early 2025.

The Georgian operation, associated with the company A.K. Group, employed about 85 people in Tbilisi. Internal financial records indicated that it received US$35.3 million from 6,179 victims between May 2022 and February 2025. The center used specialized teams for initial contact and victim retention, manipulated trading software and several language divisions. Its largest documented groups of victims were in the United Kingdom and Canada. Following publication, Georgian prosecutors opened an investigation and froze property linked to several people identified by journalists.

== Allegations of official protection ==
The long survival of some Georgian centers led journalists, civil-society organizations and opposition politicians to allege protection by officials. Such claims were initially part of a polarized political dispute: Georgian Dream representatives associated the industry with former UNM officials, particularly Kezerashvili, while opposition figures alleged links to the security services and governing-party circles.

In August 2024, the United States Commission on Security and Cooperation in Europe asserted that Georgian Dream benefited from money originating in an international network of scam call centers. Georgian Dream rejected the statement as unsupported and emphasized Georgia's participation in multinational investigations.

The controversy surrounding Kezerashvili was also shaped by a 2023 BBC investigation alleging links to the Milton Group. He denied the report and brought a defamation claim in the United Kingdom. The dispute ended in a 2024 settlement under which the BBC withdrew the contested publications and agreed to pay his legal costs.

Allegations of state protection acquired a new dimension in late 2025, when former head of the State Security Service of Georgia under the Georgian Dream government, Grigol Liluashvili, was arrested on bribery charges. Prosecutors alleged that he had protected a portion of the centers and received approximately US$1.365 million in payments. In February 2026, prosecutors charged ten people in another case, alleging that centers operating in Tbilisi between 2020 and 2023 had taken cryptocurrency worth about US$9.5 million from more than 200 foreign victims. Those charged included former Georgian Dream ally and prosecutor general Otar Partskhaladze and the well-known opposition journalist Eliso Kiladze; several defendants were prosecuted in absentia.

The Tbilisi-based anti-corruption watchdog Transparency International Georgia argued that these proceedings lent weight to earlier suspicions of official protection but criticized their timing as evidence of selective justice following changes in the political standing of the accused officials. The organization also emphasized that the total number of centers and the value of their proceeds remained uncertain.

== See also ==
- Scam call centers in Ukraine
