= Lambert Sonna Momo =

Swiss computer scientist, cryptographer, entrepreneur (born 1970)

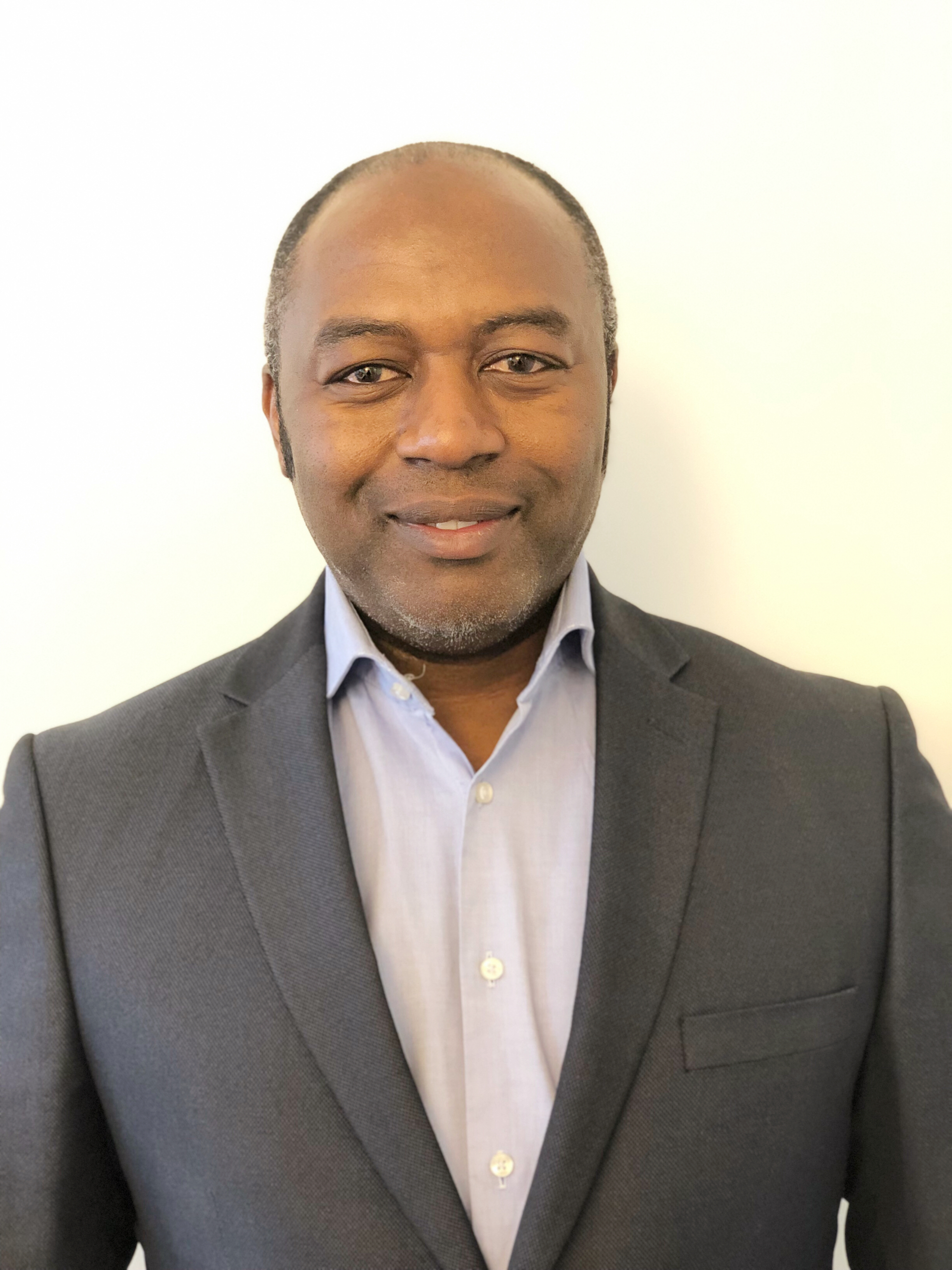
- Lambert Sonna Momo in 2019
- Born: 1970 (age 55–56); Yaoundé, Cameroon
- Citizenship: Swiss
- Education: Mathematics; Software engineering Information system
- Alma mater: University of Yaoundé; EPFL (École Polytechnique Fédérale de Lausanne); University of Lausanne
- Occupation: Entrepreneur
- Title: Founder and CEO of Global ID SA

Lambert Sonna Momo (born 1970 in Yaoundé) is a Swiss computer scientist of Cameroonian origin. He is known for his work in electronic identification and authentication through biometrics.

== Education ==
After obtaining a bachelor's degree in mathematics at the University of Yaoundé in 1993, he continued his studies with two master's degrees at the EPFL in Lausanne in software engineering (2001) and in information systems (2003).

He obtained his doctorate in information and security systems at the University of Lausanne in 2008 for a thesis on "Elaboration de tableaux de bord SSI dynamiques: une approche à base d'ontologies" (Developing dynamic ISS dashboards: an ontology-based approach) under supervision of Solange Ghernaouti-Hélie.

== Career ==
=== Academic career ===
Until 2014, he taught at University of Lausanne on topics related to computer security and the protection of private data.

In 2016, he assembled a multidisciplinary team composed of biometrics specialist Sébastien Marcel at Idiap Research Institute; cryptographer Serge Vaudenay, director of the EPFL's Security and Cryptography Laboratory, electronics engineer Pierre Roduit at HES SO Valais Wallis, and microtechnologist Eric Grenet at Swiss Centre for Electronics and Microtechnology. This team jointly developed BioID and BioLocker, a patented biometric authentication technology based on multi-view vein scanningthat combines data security and respect for private sphere protection.

=== Entrepreneurship ===
He is the founder of GLOBAL ID SA, a spin-off of EPFL that brings vein-based biometric authentication technology to the market.

The biometric technology based on vein recognition is considered ethical because the key is hidden and therefore impossible to steal; the encryption is done end-to-end with a random code that changes constantly.

The contactless scanner is under development and the project has received a grant of 1 million from the Swiss Confederation.

Lambert Sonna Momo is the Inventor of the VenoScanner.

== Publications ==
- Lambert Sonna, Momo (2011). Tableaux de bord dynamiques : une approche à base d'ontologies : élaboration d'un médiateur de sécurité à base d'ontologies pour la construction des tableaux de bord SSI dynamiques. Berlin: Éditions universitaires européennes. ISBN 978-613-1-54953-3. OCLC 835978062.

== Awards ==
- 2021: Winner of the 2nd Cameroon Digital Boost in Douala
- 2013: Honorary citizen of the city of Douala for services rendered.
- 2022: Appointed head of the Bangang community in Switzerland
