= Otar Partskhaladze =

Russian-Georgian businessman and former Prosecutor General of Georgia

- ოთარ ფარცხალაძე
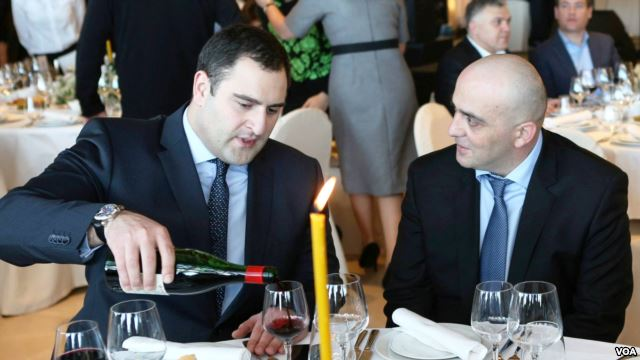
- Otar Partskhaladze (on the right) with Interior Minister Aleksandre Chikaidze in November 2013

Prosecutor General of Georgia
- In office 21 November 2013 – 30 December 2013
- Prime Minister: Irakli Garibashvili
- Preceded by: Archil Kbilashvili
- Succeeded by: Irakli Shotadze (acting); Giorgi Badashvili

Personal details
- Born: 18 June 1976 (age 50) Tbilisi, Georgian SSR, Soviet Union
- Citizenship: Russia; Georgia (until 2023)
- Occupation: Businessman, former prosecutor

Otar Partskhaladze, also known as Otar Anzorovich Romanov Partskhaladze, (Georgian: ოთარ ფარცხალაძე; born 18 June 1976) is a Georgian-Russian businessman and former Georgian official who briefly served as Prosecutor General of Georgia in 2013. His appointment by the Georgian Dream government, subsequent business career, and reported association with the party founder and tycoon Bidzina Ivanishvili made him a prominent figure in controversies over informal influence and the independence of Georgian state institutions.

Partskhaladze resigned as prosecutor general after his prior conviction in Germany became public. The United States sanctioned him in 2023, alleging that Russia's Federal Security Service (FSB) had used him to influence Georgian society and politics for Russia's benefit; he denied the allegation. The United Kingdom imposed further sanctions in 2025, citing his support for Russia's war against Ukraine and his links to Russia and senior Georgian Dream figures. Partskhaladze adopted the surname Romanov after acquiring a Russian citizenship in 2024. Having fallen out with Georgia's ruling party, he has been tried in absentia in Georgia since 2025 on charges of organizing the killing of businessman Levan Jangveladze and was separately charged in 2026 in an alleged scam call-center fraud and money-laundering scheme. Both cases remained pending as of August 2026.

== Early life and career ==
Partskhaladze was born in Tbilisi on 18 June 1976. His official biography states that he studied law at the Open Humanities University of Georgia from 1991 to 1995. The chronology, according to which he received a law degree at age 19, was questioned after his appointment as prosecutor general; the Prosecutor's Office explained that he had advanced a school grade.

He worked in the Ministry of Internal Affairs before joining the Finance Ministry's Investigation Service. Between 2008 and 2013 he served in its Shida Kartli regional unit and later rose to head the service. Prime Minister Irakli Garibashvili appointed him prosecutor general in November 2013.

== Prosecutor general ==
After the Georgian Dream coalition led by the multibillionaire businessman Bidzina Ivanishvili came to power in Georgia in October 2012, Partskhaladze was appointed Prosecutor General of Georgia in November 2013.

Partskhaladze's tenure was dominated by questions about his background and allegations concerning the treatment of former officials. In December 2013, opposition politician Gigi Ugulava disclosed that he had a criminal conviction in Germany. Partskhaladze acknowledged a conviction arising from an incident with police but rejected reports that he had been convicted of robbery and theft, describing the offence as a confrontation with a police officer. Garibashvili confirmed the criminal record but initially rejected calls for Partskhaladze's dismissal.

During the same period, former prime minister Vano Merabishvili, who was in pre-trial detention, alleged that prison officials had secretly removed him from his cell and taken him to meet Partskhaladze, who sought information about former president Mikheil Saakashvili and the death of former prime minister Zurab Zhvania. A Georgian investigation did not substantiate the account. In 2017, however, the Grand Chamber of the European Court of Human Rights found Merabishvili's description of his nocturnal removal "sufficiently convincing and therefore proven". It held that the predominant purpose of his continued detention had become the extraction of information in unrelated matters, contrary to Article 18 of the European Convention on Human Rights read with Article 5 § 1. The judgment did not determine Partskhaladze's criminal liability.

Partskhaladze resigned on 30 December 2013, stating that doubts about his biography should not undermine the legitimacy of the Prosecutor's Office. Ivanishvili later responded to criticism of his government's vetting process by acknowledging that Partskhaladze's background had not been checked adequately.

== Business activities and controversies ==
After leaving office, Partskhaladze entered business and accumulated substantial property interests. Georgian investigative journalists and civil-society organizations questioned the rapid growth of his holdings and several transactions involving associated companies. He was widely described as close to Ivanishvili's family and other figures in the Georgian Dream network. Ivanishvili stated that his son Bera was godfather to Partskhaladze's grandchild, but characterized Partskhaladze as a family friend rather than his own.

In 2017, State Audit Office head Lasha Tordia accused Partskhaladze and his security elements of assaulting him at a Tbilisi nightclub in connection with an audit of property transfers involving a company associated with Partskhaladze. Partskhaladze denied the allegation and maintained that Tordia had initiated the confrontation. He was charged with battery in 2018 but acquitted by Tbilisi City Court in January 2021; a second defendant was convicted and fined.

== Citizenship and international sanctions ==
On 14 September 2023, the United States designated Partskhaladze under Executive Order 14024 and added him to the Specially Designated Nationals and Blocked Persons List, blocking property under United States jurisdiction and generally prohibiting transactions involving it by United States persons. The State Department alleged that FSB officer Aleksander Onishchenko had probably assisted Partskhaladze in obtaining a Russian passport and possibly Russian citizenship, and that the FSB had used him to influence Georgian society and politics. It also alleged that he had profited personally from the relationship. Partskhaladze rejected the claims as assumption-based, blamed a campaign by the opposition United National Movement, and denied ties to Georgian state institutions. Georgian Dream officials demanded supporting evidence from the United States.

Response from Georgian official institutions triggered further controversy. The National Bank of Georgia initially announced that Georgian financial institutions would implement the sanctions. After Georgian Dream chair Irakli Kobakhidze argued that freezing Partskhaladze's assets would violate his constitutional rights, the bank amended its rules so that sanctions against Georgian citizens would not be enforced without a final Georgian court judgment. The amendment effectively exempted Partskhaladze from the domestic asset freeze while he remained a Georgian citizen. In response, three vice-governors of the National Bank resigned, and the decision was criticized as political interference with the central bank independence and a retreat from Georgia's alignment with Western sanctions policy.

On 17 October 2023, President Salome Zourabichvili terminated Partskhaladze's Georgian citizenship after the Ministry of Justice determined that he had acquired Russian citizenship without the required notification. In 2024, Partskhaladze adopted "Romanov" as part of his surname. His associates claimed that a "commission" had established his descent from the Russian imperial House of Romanov; official sanctions records subsequently listed him as Otar Anzorovich Romanov Partskhaladze.

The United Kingdom sanctioned Partskhaladze under its Russia sanctions regime on 19 September 2025. The British government described him as a supporter of Russia's war against Ukraine with extensive links to Russia and the highest levels of Georgian Dream. The measures comprised an asset freeze, travel ban, director-disqualification restrictions and trust-services sanctions.

== Criminal proceedings in Georgia ==
In December 2025, Georgian authorities charged Partskhaladze in absentia with organizing the contract killing of businessman Levan Jangveladze in Tbilisi on 14 March 2025. Prosecutors alleged that a group led by Partskhaladze and brothers Davit and Giorgi Mikadze had arranged the murder following a business dispute with Jangveladze. A court ordered his pre-trial detention in absentia, and Georgian authorities placed him on a wanted list; he was reported to be in Russia. Partskhaladze denied the charges. Although other defendants were convicted, his trial remained pending as of August 2026.

In February 2026, prosecutors charged Partskhaladze and nine others in a separate fraud and money-laundering case involving alleged scam call centers. They claimed that the group, operating under his patronage, had obtained cryptocurrency worth approximately US$9.5 million from more than 200 foreign citizens between 2020 and 2023 and that associates had protected the operation from law enforcement and rival groups.

== Involvement in the Russian invasion of Ukraine ==
In August 2026, Russian news agency TASS reported that Romanov-Partskhaladze voluntarily joined the Russian side in its war against Ukraine, taking command of a pro-Russian volunteer combat unit named "Georgievsk" after the 1783 Russo-Georgian Treaty of Georgievsk which is a source of heated historical debates in Georgia. Partskhaladze stated that he and his team had been actively providing aid to Russian servicemen and civilians in occupied Ukrainian territory and Russian border regions since the start of the conflict.
