= Milton group =

Organized crime group

Milton group is the name given to an organized crime network of scamming operations, operating globally, and run largely from call centres in Tbilisi, Georgia and Kyiv, Ukraine.

BBC Eye Investigations uncovered 152 brands used by the Milton group, including Solo Capitals, an ostensible cryptocurrency trading firm in Georgia, CoinEvo and EverFX.

EverFX were a leading sponsor of the Spanish football club Sevilla FC, and defrauded at least 170,000 people, many in Spain, until EverFX was banned by the UK's Financial Conduct Authority (FCA).

== See also ==
- Scam call centers in Georgia
- Scam call centers in Ukraine
