= Reza Derakhshani =

Iranian-born American inventor

- رضا درخشانی
- Born: Iran
- Education: University of West Virginia (M.S., Ph.D.), Iran University of Science and Technology (B.S.)
- Known for: eye vein verification
- Scientific career
- Fields: electrical engineering, pattern recognition
- Workplaces: University of Missouri Kansas City
- Website: sce2.umkc.edu/csee/derakhshanir/Main.html

Reza R. Derakhshani is an Iranian-born American inventor and professor of computer science and electrical engineering at the University of Missouri Kansas City (UMKC). He is known for inventing and developing a biometric security system that uses the patterns of blood vessels in the eyes. His research has encompassed biometrics, biometric spoofing, biomedical signal and image processing, and computational intelligence.

== Life and career ==
After earning his B.S. at Iran University of Science and Technology in Tehran, Derakhshani continued his studies at West Virginia University in Morganstown, where he earned his Ph.D.

He later taught at Georgetown University, Washington, D.C., and then UMKC. His courses include advanced biomedical signal analysis, neural and adaptive systems courses and overseeing senior robotics design projects. Along with biometrics, he also researches biomedical signal and image processing and computational intelligence. Much of his research has been funded by the National Science Foundation's Center for Identification Technology Research.

He also is chief science officer of EyeVerify, a Missouri-based startup company that develops and markets biometric security software based on Derakhshani's research.

== Eye vein verification ==
Derakhshani identified the potential usefulness of the patterns of blood vessels in the sclera — the white part of the eyes — which are unique to each person. The pattern can be imaged and turned into a digital template, and then encoded with mathematical and statistical algorithms. These allow confirmation of the identity of the proper user and the rejection of anyone else.

Derakhshani holds several patents on the technology, including a 2008 patent for the concept of using the blood vessels seen in the whites of the eye as a unique identifier.

== Honors and awards ==
- 2014 UMKC N.T. Veatch Award for Distinguished Research and Creative Activity.
- 2013 Silicon Prairie Technologist of the Year finalist.
- Privacy by Design Ambassador (August 2013 – Present).
- The 2008 UMKC Trustees’ Faculty Scholar Fellowship Award for distinguished research and creativity
- January 2002 – January 2004. Lane Fellowship for highest academic achievement in field of study, Lane Department of Computer Science and Electrical Engineering, West Virginia University.
