= Global Initiative Against Transnational Organized Crime =

Switzerland-based organization

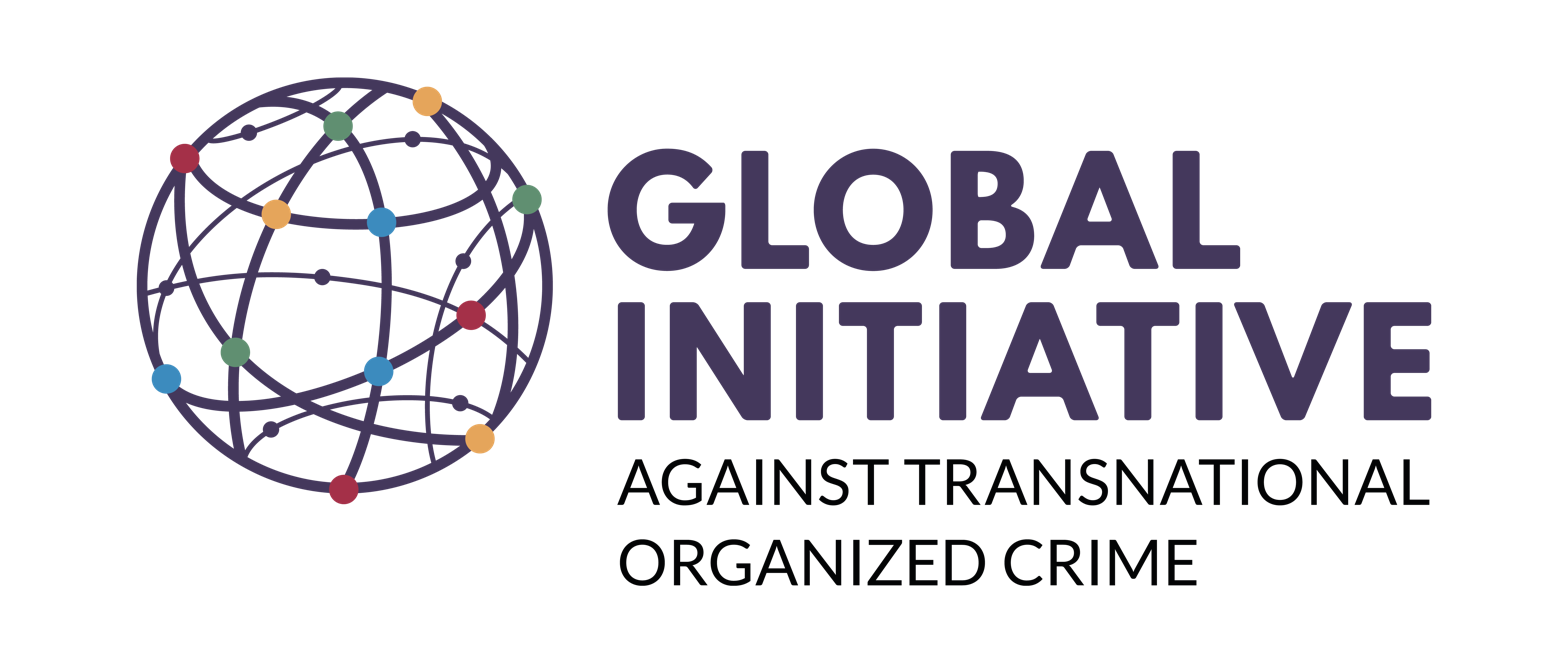
- Formation: 2013; 13 years ago
- Type: International non-governmental organization
- Purpose: Responses to organized crime
- Headquarters: Geneva, Switzerland
- Region served: Worldwide
- Executive Director: Mark Shaw
- Main organ: Board of directors, elected by the Annual General Meeting
- Website: globalinitiative.net

The Global Initiative Against Transnational Organized Crime (GI-TOC), sometimes shortened as Global Initiative, is an international non-governmental organization headquartered in Geneva. The organisation is composed of a network of law enforcement, governance and development practitioners, who share the objective of developing innovative strategies and responses to organized crime. In July 2020, the network counted 500 experts.

The organisation was launched formally at the United Nations headquarters, in New York in September 2013. It was initially established with funding and operational support from both the Governments of Norway and of Switzerland. The Global Initiative has offices in Geneva, Vienna, Cape Town, and Malta.

== Governance ==
The Global Initiative Board for 2017-2020 is composed of Sarah F. Cliffe (Chair), and board members Rodrigo Avila, Gwen Boniface, Solange Ghernaouti, Misha Glenny, Marc Hofstetter, Kristin Kvigne, Nick Lewis, Moises Naim, Mary Jane C. Ortega and Gladwell Otieno. The leadership team is composed of Mark Shaw (Director) and Tuesday Reitano (Deputy Director).

== Activities and partnerships ==
The Global Initiative has published numerous publications, reports and policy briefs on organised crime. It has published a report together with the World Wide Fund for Nature on combatting environmental crime.

According to an article at Polizia Moderna, the Global Initiative is the first organisation which analysed the risks and dangers associated with the infiltration of criminal organisations into the management of the COVID-19 pandemic, including a focus on the social and economic results. In March 2020, the organisation published a report of which summarized the impact of the COVID-19 pandemic on crime.

In 2024 the Global Initiative published a report on the criminal background to migrant smuggling across the English Channel.

The Global Initiative provides briefings to the United Nation Security Council, highlighting that the United Nations System needs a coherent, streamlined and strategic approach to combat organized crime and to reduce its negative impacts on peace and prosperity.

Together with Poseidon Aquatic Resource Management Ltd., the Global Initiative developed an illegal, unreported and unregulated (IUU) fishing index for coastal states, which measures the degree to which states are exposed to and effectively combat IUU fishing.

The Global Initiative co-organizes workshops with the United Nations Office on Drugs and Crime focusing on non-governmental alliances and developing multi-stakeholder engagement, in the context of the United Nations Convention against Transnational Organized Crime (UNTOC).

Together with Babson College and the International Organization for Migration, the Global Initiative is a founder of the Responsible and Ethical Private Sector Coalition against Trafficking (RESPECT) initiative, which aims to find solutions to modern slavery in the public and private sectors.

The Global Initiative has partnerships with Interpol, and Wilton Park. It is a member of the Geneva Center for Security Sector Governance, and of the Global Risk Governance programme.

== Global Organized Crime Index ==
The Global Organized Crime Index is an index that measures and ranks countries based on the prevalence of organized crime and their resilience to it. The Index was first published in 2021 by GI-TOC and was based on the 2019 ENACT Organised Crime Index for Africa.
