= Borna Derakhshani =

Iranian-English chess player (born 2002)

Personal information
- Born: 10 February 2002 (age 24) Tehran, Iran

Chess career
- Country: Iran (until 2018); England (since 2018)
- Title: FIDE Master (2016)
- Peak rating: 2400 (November 2022)

Borna Derakhshani (Persian: برنا درخشانی; born 2002) is an Iranian-English chess player. He has represented England in competition since April 2018. He was awarded the title FIDE Master (FM) in 2016.

== Career ==
Derakhshani was a Chess Youth Champion in Iran, and won a silver medal in the Individual Asian Chess Championship in 2012. Derakhshani won several youth open international tournaments, including in Biel, Switzerland; Abu Dhabi in 2013, 2014, and 2015; the Youth International in Gibraltar in August 2017; and the Asian Youth Team Chess Championship in China, 2016, with a silver medal on Board 2.

=== Conflict with Iranian Chess Federation ===
In February 2017, the Iranian Chess Federation banned Derakhshani from playing for the Iranian youth national team or any other tournament in Iran because he played against Israeli grandmaster Alexander Huzman in the first round of the International Gibraltar Chess Tournament in January 2017. The ban was implemented because Iran does not recognize Israel as a country.

=== United Kingdom ===
After the ban and receiving several bad press releases from the media and authorities, Derakhshani decided not to return to Iran. He moved to the UK where he switched to the English Chess Federation. He won the British Youth Chess Championship Under 16 category in 2018 and won in the Under 18 category in 2019. He won a silver medal and finished second in the Under 21 British Chess Championship. Derakhshani represented the UK national team in 2019 at the European Team Youth Chess Championship where he finished second on Board 2. He is a member of the 4NCL UK super league, playing for the Wood Green team.
