= Afghan Girl =

1985 National Geographic cover photograph

- Artist: Steve McCurry
- Year: 1984
- Medium: Kodachrome 64 colour-slide film, via Nikon FM2 camera and Nikkor 105mm Ai-S f/2.5 lens
- Subject: Sharbat Gula

Afghan Girl is a 1984 photographic portrait of Sharbat Gula, an Afghan refugee in Pakistan during the Soviet–Afghan War. The photograph, taken by American photojournalist Steve McCurry near the Pakistani city of Peshawar, appeared on the June 1985 cover of National Geographic. While the portrait's subject initially remained unknown, she was identified by early 2002: Gula, an ethnic Pashtun from Afghanistan's Nangarhar Province, was a 12-year-old child residing in Pakistan's Nasir Bagh.

In light of the Cold War, the portrait was described as the "First World's Third World Mona Lisa" in reference to the famous 16th-century portrait painting of the same name by Leonardo da Vinci. Gula's image became "emblematic" in some social circles as the "refugee girl/woman located in some distant camp" that was deserving of compassion from the Western viewer, and also as a symbol of Afghanistan to the West. CNN called it the 'world's most famous photograph'.

== Cover photo for National Geographic ==
Sharbat Gula was one of the students in an informal school at the Nasir Bagh refugee camp in 1984. Her photograph was taken by National Geographic Society photographer Steve McCurry, on Kodachrome 64 colour slide film, with a Nikon FM2 camera and Nikkor 105mm Ai-S F2.5 lens. The pre-print retouching of the photograph was done by Graphic Art Service, based in Marietta, Georgia. McCurry did not record the name of the person he had photographed.

The photograph, entitled Afghan Girl, appeared on the June 1985 cover of National Geographic. The image of her face, with a red scarf draped loosely over her head and her eyes staring directly into the camera, was named "the most recognized photograph" in the magazine's history, and the cover is one of National Geographic's best known. American Photo magazine says the image has an "unusual combination of grittiness and glamour". Gula's green eyes have been the subject of much commentary.

== Sharbat Gula ==
McCurry made several unsuccessful attempts during the 1990s to find and identify the subject of the photograph. In January 2002, a National Geographic team traveled to Afghanistan to find her. Upon learning that the Nasir Bagh refugee camp was soon to close, McCurry inquired of its remaining residents, one of whom knew Gula's brother and was able to send word to her hometown. Several women falsely identified themselves as the Afghan Girl. In addition, after being shown the 1984 photograph, several young men erroneously identified her as their wife.

The team found Gula, then around age 30, in a remote region of Afghanistan; she had returned to her native country from the refugee camp in 1992. Her identity was confirmed by John Daugman using iris recognition. She recalled being photographed. She had been photographed on only three occasions: in 1984 and during the search for her when a National Geographic producer took the identifying photographs that led to the reunion with McCurry. She had never seen Afghan Girl until it was shown to her in 2002.

A devout Muslim, Gula normally wears a burqa and was hesitant to meet McCurry, as he was a male from outside the family. After finding Gula, National Geographic covered the costs of medical treatment for her family and a pilgrimage to Mecca.

Pashtun by ethnicity and from a rural background, Gula's family fled their village in eastern Nangarhar during the Soviet Union's bombing of Afghanistan when she was around six years old. Along with her father, brother, and three sisters, she walked across the mountains to Pakistan to the Nasir Bagh refugee camp in 1984 where she was photographed.

On 26 October 2016, Pakistan's Federal Investigation Agency arrested Gula for living in Pakistan with forged documents. She was sentenced to fifteen days in detention and deported to Afghanistan. Following the takeover of Afghanistan by the Taliban in 2021, women's rights were curtailed under their conservative rule, and high-profile women were threatened or intimidated. The Afghan Girl photograph had made Gula globally famous, hence her prominence put her in danger. She sought assistance to leave the country, and was evacuated to Italy with the support of its government in response to appeals from nonprofit organizations.

== Criticism ==
A 2019 article from The Wire described a 2002 interview where Gula stated that she was angered by the photograph being taken and published without her consent. The writer for The Wire suggests that this is because "it is not welcome for a girl of traditional Pashtun culture to reveal her face, share space, make eye contact and be photographed by a man who does not belong to her family."

== Legacy ==
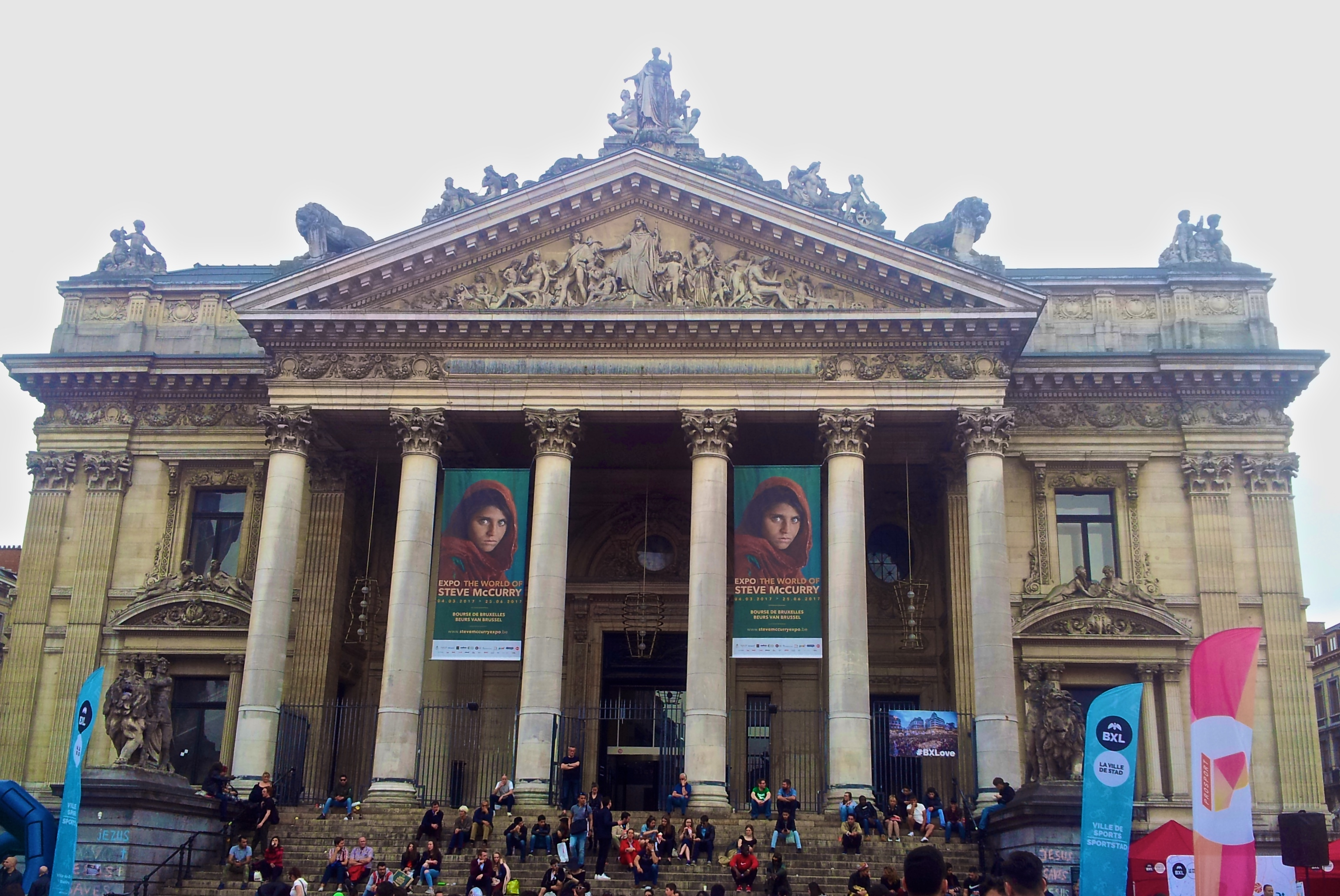
The World of Steve McCurry exposition at the Bourse Palace, Brussels, in May 2017

Interest in the photograph increased after the 9/11 attacks, when the George W. Bush administration began promoting Afghan women's rights during the U.S. military campaign in Afghanistan. Photographs of Gula were featured as part of a cover story on her life in the April 2002 issue of National Geographic and she was the subject of a television documentary, Search for the Afghan Girl, that aired in March 2002. In recognition of her, National Geographic set up the Afghan Girls Fund, a charitable organization with the goal of educating Afghan girls and young women. In 2008, the fund's scope was broadened to include boys and the name was changed to Afghan Children's Fund.

== See also ==
- Afghan clothing
- List of photographs considered the most important
