= Sharbat Gula =

Subject of 1985 Afghan Girl photograph

- شربت ګله
- Born: c. 1972 (age 53–54); Shinwar, Nangarhar, Kingdom of Afghanistan
- Known for: June 1985 cover photograph of National Geographic
- Spouse: Rahmat Gul (?–2012; his death)
- Children: 5 (1 deceased)

Sharbat Gula (Pashto: شربت ګله; born c. 1972) is an Afghan woman who became internationally recognized as the subject in Afghan Girl, a 1984 portrait taken by American photojournalist Steve McCurry that was later published as the cover photograph for the June 1985 issue of National Geographic. The portrait was shot at Nasir Bagh, Pakistan, while Gula was residing there as an Afghan refugee fleeing the Soviet–Afghan War. Despite the photograph's high global recognition, Gula's identity remained unknown until 2002, when her whereabouts were verified and she was photographed for the second time in her life. Having lived and raised a family in Pakistan for 35 years, Gula was arrested by Pakistani authorities in 2016 and subsequently deported to Afghanistan in 2017 on the charge of possessing forged identity documents. However, in November 2021, Gula was granted asylum in Italy, three months after the Taliban takeover of Afghanistan.

== Early life ==
Gula was born around 1972 into a Pashtun family in the Shinwar District of Nangarhar Province. In the early 1980s, her village was attacked by Soviet helicopters and it was initially reported that during the attacks her parents were killed. Her sisters, brothers and grandmother moved to Pakistan to the Nasir Bagh refugee camp on the border with Afghanistan. However, Gula corrected the earlier reports, stating that her mother died of appendicitis and that her father was alive when they moved to Pakistan.

== Afghan Girl photograph ==
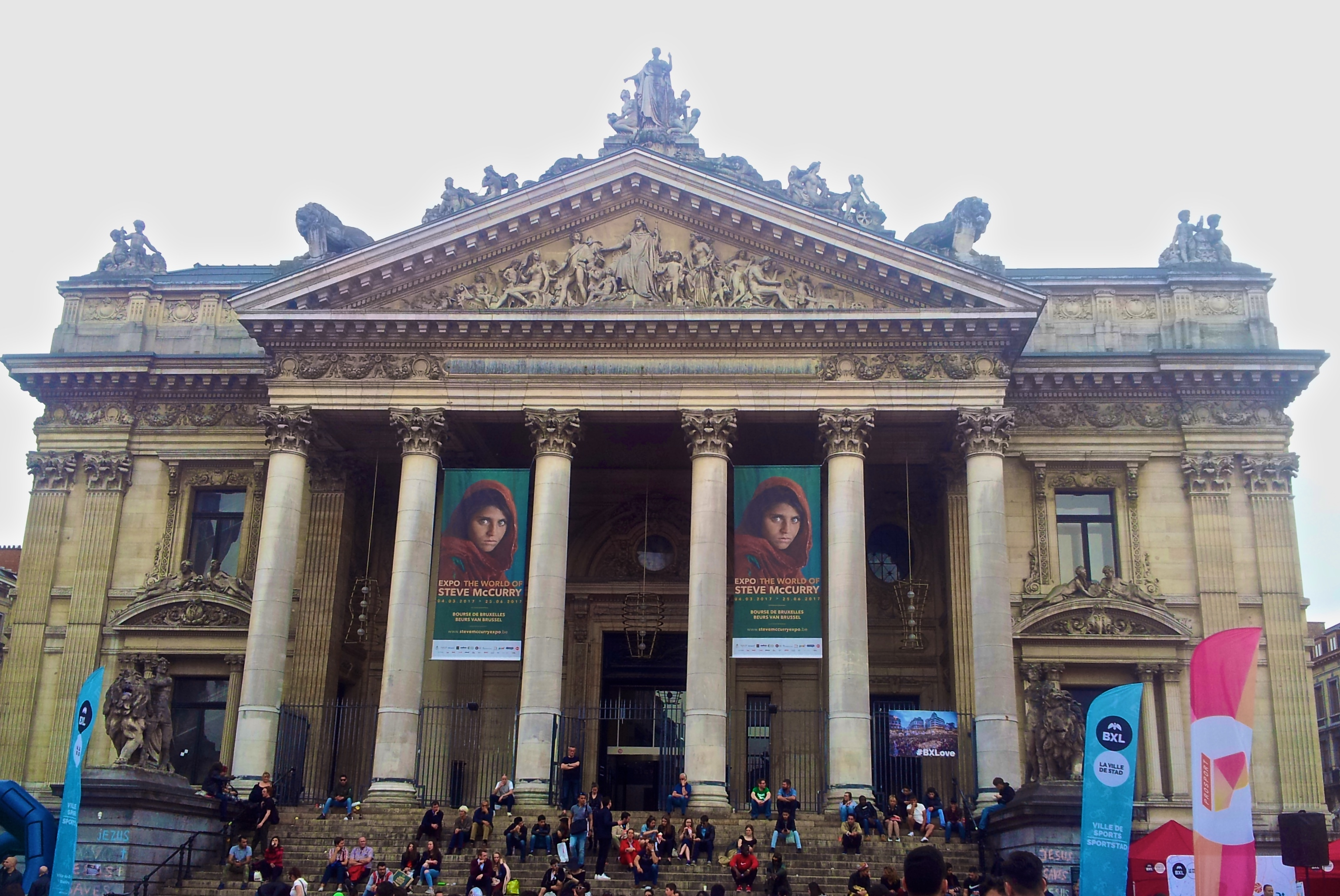
Sharbat Gula – Brussels – 2017

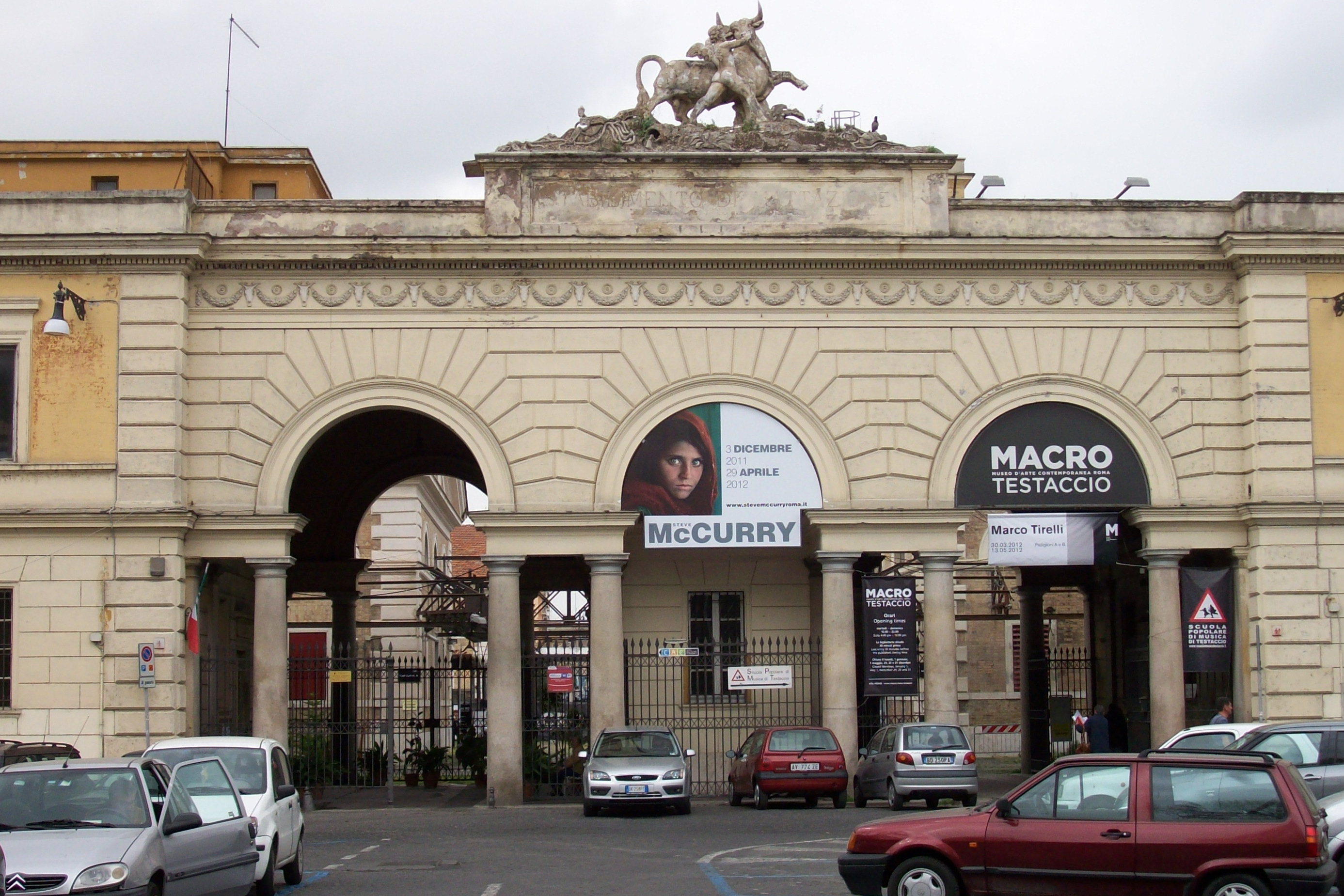
2012-04-05 MACRO Testaccio esterno

In 1984, National Geographic photographer Steve McCurry travelled to Afghanistan to document the effects of the war, visiting refugee camps, many of which were on the Afghan-Pakistan border. Whilst there, McCurry took what was to become one of the most iconic cover photographs for National Geographic. While Gula was attending school at the refugee camp in Pakistan, McCurry photographed her and other girls. It was later alleged that McCurry did not obtain permission to take the images, which contradict Pashtun culture, where women should not show their faces to men outside the family.

Initially, the magazine's editor did not want to use the image, but eventually gave in, publishing a cover image which was simply called Afghan Girl. It was the June 1985 issue, well after the picture had been taken. The photo, which shows a girl with a striking green eye colour, looking straight into the lens with a piercing stare, became a symbol of the Afghan conflict and the problems affecting refugees around the world.

The image is the only one to have been used three times on a National Geographic cover. (The first was June 1985. The second time came after she had been identified, seventeen years later, in the April 2002 issue. The third came in 2013, in an issue titled "The Photo Issue", on the occasion of National Geographic's 125th anniversary.)

Gula was the subject of a television documentary, Search for the Afghan Girl, that aired in March 2002.

In a 2022 interview with La Repubblica, Sharbat Gula shared her feelings on the photo: "That photo created a lot of problems for me ... I would have preferred it had never been taken. I remember that day well, that photographer who arrived at the Nasir Bagh camp school. I was a child. I didn't like photos. In Afghan culture women do not appear in photos. But there wasn't much choice".

== Marriage and family life ==
In the mid-1980s, she was married to baker Rahmat Gula when she was aged 13, and returned to Afghanistan in 1992. As of 2002, Gula had three daughters, Robin, Zahid and Alyan – her fourth daughter died shortly after birth. She later had a son. Her husband died from hepatitis C around 2012. She expressed hopes that her children will be able to gain an education.

Asked if she had ever felt safe, she responded: "No. But life under the Taliban was better. At least there was peace and order." When asked how she had survived, she responded that it was "the will of God". She later had to flee the country after the Taliban threatened her life.

== Identifying Sharbat Gula ==
The identity of the girl remained unknown for more than 17 years. In the 1990s, McCurry made several unsuccessful attempts to find out the girl's name. In January 2002, a National Geographic team led by Steve McCurry travelled to Afghanistan to find her. During this search several women and men came forward, claiming either to be Gula, or to be married to her. Eventually she was tracked down through a camp resident who knew her brother. Her identity was verified by John Daugman using iris recognition software.

A devout Muslim, Gula normally wears a burqa and was hesitant to meet McCurry, because he was a male from outside the family. Gula had no idea how globally iconic her face had become over the intervening years. When asked how she felt about the photograph, she replied: "I became very surprised [because] I didn't like media and taking photos from childhood. At first, I was concerned about the publicity of my photo but when I found out that I have been the cause of support/help for many people/refugees, then I became happy."

After finding Gula, National Geographic covered the costs of medical treatment for her family and a pilgrimage to Mecca.

== Deportation to Afghanistan in 2017, evacuation to Italy in 2021 ==
In 2015, Pakistani newspapers reported that the National Database and Registration Authority (NADRA) had canceled Gula's Computerized National Identity Card (CNIC) and those of her two sons. Reports claimed the cards had been issued illegally. A NADRA source reportedly said, "They may not be her sons but this is a common practice among Afghan refugees whereby they list names of non-relatives as their children to obtain documents." A relative said that the family lives in Pakistan, but "We travel between Pakistan and Afghanistan depending on the security situation."

On 26 October 2016, Pakistan's Federal Investigation Agency arrested Gula for living in Pakistan with forged documents. She was sentenced to fifteen days in detention, fined, and, after living in Pakistan for 35 years, deported to Afghanistan. The decision was criticized by Amnesty International as emblematic of Pakistan's cruel treatment of Afghan refugees. In Kabul, Sharbat Gula and her children were welcomed by then-President Ashraf Ghani and former President Hamid Karzai at the presidential palace. The government promised to support her financially. In December 2017, Sharbat Gula was given a 3,000-square-foot (280 m^{2}) residence in Kabul for her and her children and a $700 per month stipend for living and medical costs.

After the Taliban capture of Kabul in 2021, the Taliban threatened or intimidated high-profile women such as Gula. At her request, she was evacuated to Italy at the end of November 2021, where she was granted refugee status.

== Popular culture ==
=== Music ===
The Finnish metal band Nightwish dedicated an instrumental work to Gula, on the 2015 album Endless Forms Most Beautiful entitled "The Eyes of Sharbat Gula". Here Be Dragons, an album by The Kilimanjaro Darkjazz Ensemble includes a composition called "Sharbat Gula".

=== Poetry ===
In 2017, the New England Review published a new work by poet Gjertrud Schnakenberg, entitled "Afghan Girl", which the author had been composing since 2012.
