= Iris Challenge Evaluation =

The Iris Challenge Evaluation (ICE) were a series of events conducted and managed by the National Institute of Standards and Technology for projects on technology development and evaluation for iris recognition. Industry, academia, and research institutions from both in and outside the U.S. were allowed to participate.

The ICE 2006 was the first large-scale, open, independent technology evaluation for iris recognition. The primary goals of the ICE projects were to promote the development and advancement of iris recognition technology and assess its state-of-the-art capability. The ICE projects were open to academia, industry and research institutes.

== ICE 2005 ==
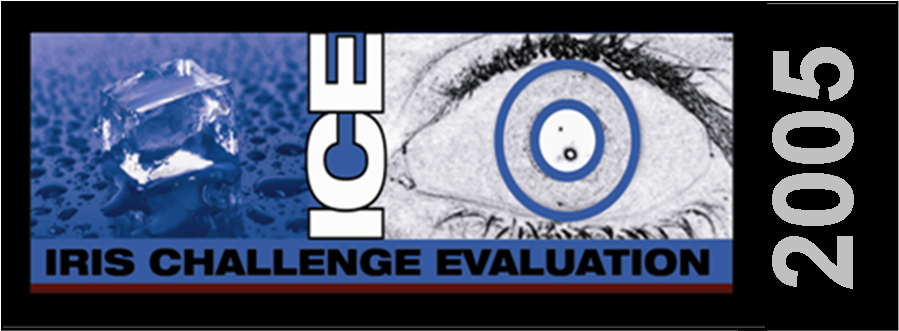
ICE 2005 logo

The ICE 2005 was a technology development project for iris recognition. It consisted of an iris recognition challenge problem that was distributed to potential participants. The event took place between August 2005 and March 2006. The primary goal of ICE 2005, the recognition technology development project, was to promote and advance iris recognition technology that supports existing iris recognition efforts in the U.S. Government.

Researchers interested in iris recognition may still obtain copies of the ICE 2005 dataset.

== ICE 2006 ==
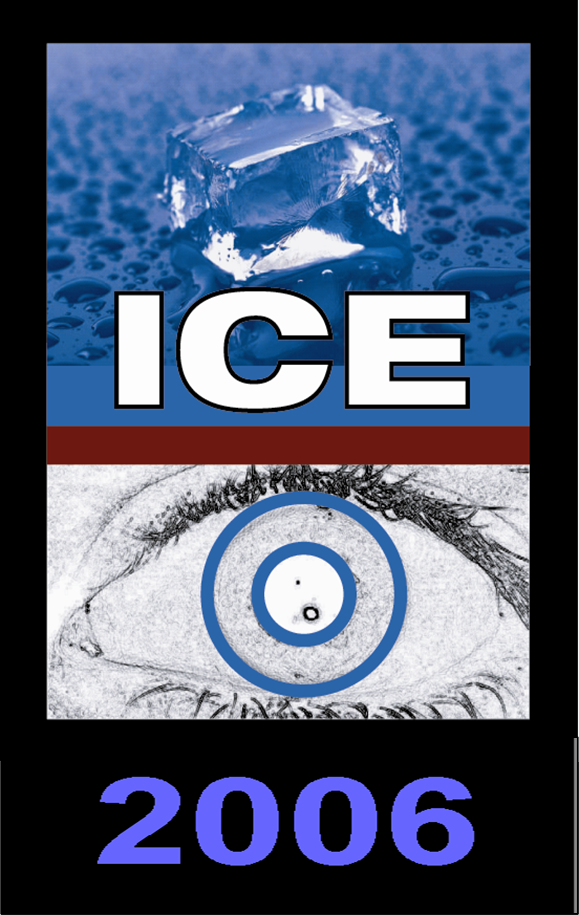
ICE 2006 logo

ICE 2006 consisted of a large-scale, open, independent technology evaluation of iris recognition technology. To guarantee an accurate assessment, the ICE measured performance with sequestered data (data not previously seen by the researchers or developers). A standard dataset and test methodology was employed so that all participants were evenly evaluated.

The ICE 2006 started on June 15, 2006, and results from the event were published in March 2007. The primary goal of ICE 2006 was to determine the state-of-the-art capability of automatic iris recognition technology and to establish a performance baseline against which to measure future progress. Results of this effort may provide design input for future evaluations. The ICE 2006 large-scale evaluation report is available on the ICE 2006 webpage.

== Sponsors ==
- Department of Homeland Security (DHS)
- FBI Criminal Justice Information Services Division
- Intelligence Advanced Research Projects Agency (IARPA)
- National Institute of Justice
- Technical Support Working Group (TSWG)
