= Steve McCurry =

American photographer (born 1950)

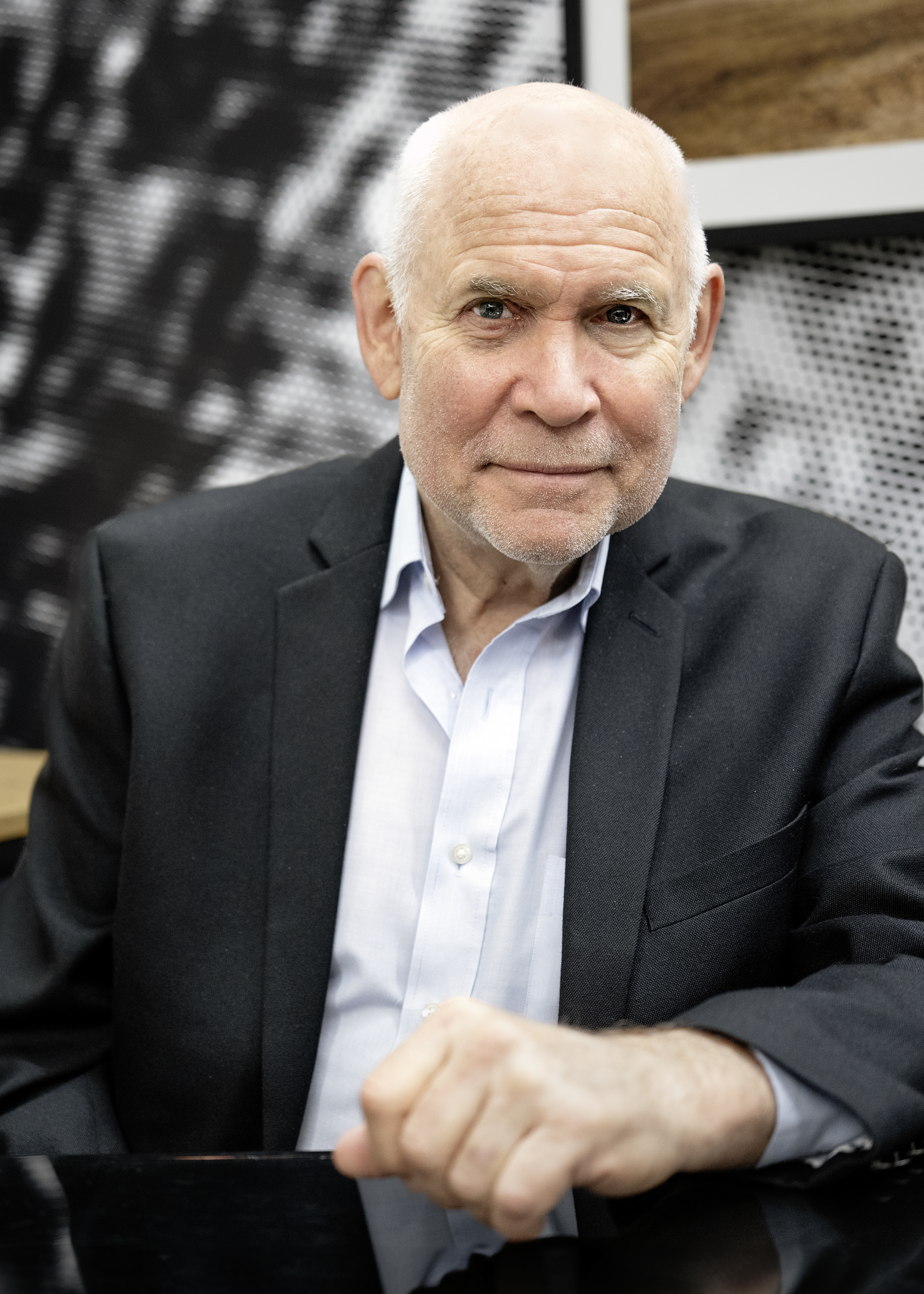
- McCurry in 2024
- Born: April 23, 1950 (age 76); Philadelphia, Pennsylvania, U.S.
- Occupation: Photographer
- Agent: Magnum Photos
- Notable credit(s): Leica Hall of Fame Award, Hasselblad Master Robert Capa Gold Medal for Best Photographic Reporting from Abroad
- Website: www.stevemccurry.com

Signature
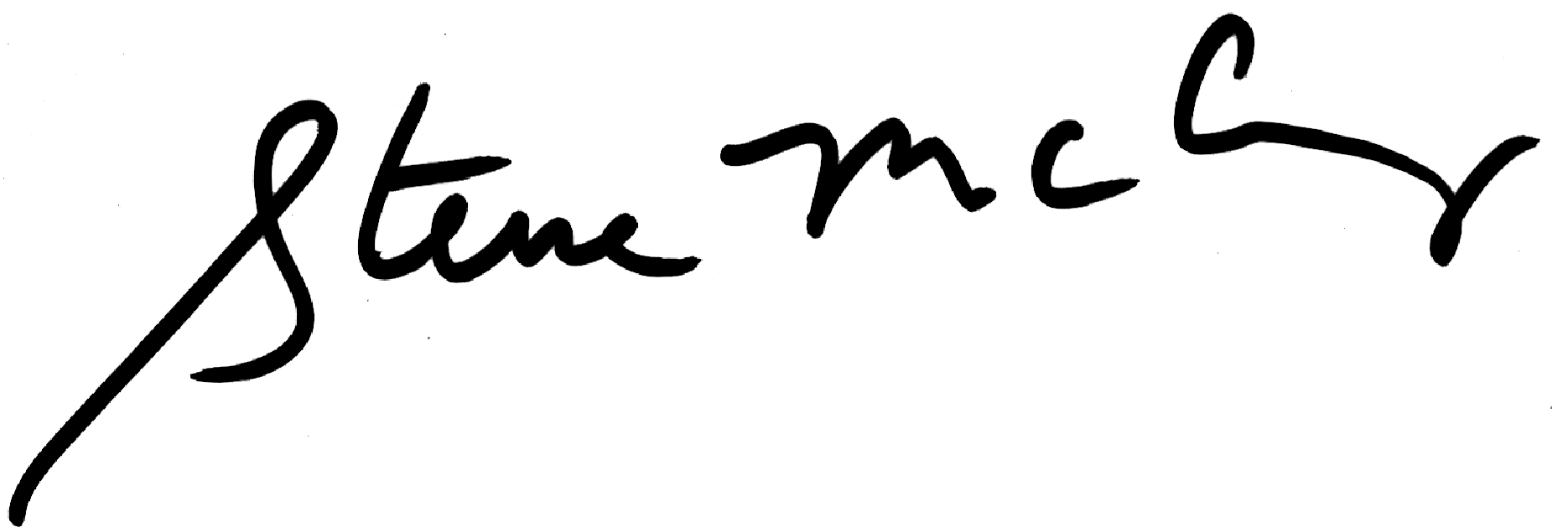

Steve McCurry (born April 23, 1950) is an American photographer, freelancer, and photojournalist. His photo Afghan Girl, of a girl with piercing green eyes, has appeared on the cover of National Geographic several times. McCurry has photographed many assignments for National Geographic and has been a member of Magnum Photos since 1986.

McCurry is the recipient of numerous awards, including Magazine Photographer of the Year, awarded by the National Press Photographers Association; the Royal Photographic Society's Centenary Medal; and two first-place prizes in the World Press Photo contest (1985 and 1992).

== Life and work ==
McCurry was born in Philadelphia, Pennsylvania, and attended Penn State University. He originally planned to study cinematography and filmmaking, but instead gained a degree in theater arts and graduated in 1974. He became interested in photography when he started taking pictures for the Penn State newspaper The Daily Collegian.

After a year working in India, McCurry traveled to northern Pakistan where he met two Afghans who told him about the war across the border in Afghanistan. Disguised in Afghani garb, he crossed the Pakistan border into rebel-controlled areas of Afghanistan just before the Soviet invasion. "As soon as I crossed the border, I came across about 40 houses and a few schools that were just bombed out," he says. He left with rolls of film sewn into his turban and stuffed in his socks and underwear. These images were subsequently published by The New York Times, Time and Paris Match and won him the Robert Capa Gold Medal for Best Photographic Reporting from Abroad.

McCurry covered more armed conflicts like the Iran–Iraq War, Lebanon Civil War, the Cambodian Civil War, the Islamic insurgency in the Philippines, the Gulf War and the Afghan Civil War. McCurry came close to losing his life twice. He was almost drowned in India, and he survived an airplane crash in Yugoslavia. McCurry has had his work featured in magazines worldwide and he is a frequent contributor to National Geographic.

On the morning of September 11, 2001, McCurry received a call saying the World Trade Center was on fire. He went up to the roof of his building and started taking photographs, unaware that a plane had hit the towers. He photographed the two towers and their eventual collapse. After the fall of the towers, he ran to Ground Zero with his assistant. He left later that night and went back early on September 12. He had no press credentials and evaded security to access the site. He was eventually caught and escorted off Ground Zero; he did not go back again.

McCurry switched from shooting color slide film to digital capture in 2005 for the convenience of editing in the field and transmitting images to photo editors. He said that he had no nostalgia about working in film in an interview with The Guardian. "Perhaps old habits are hard to break, but my experience is that the majority of my colleagues, regardless of age, have switched over ... The quality has never been better. You can work in extremely low light situations, for example."

McCurry shoots in both film and digital, but has said that he prefers shooting with transparency film. Kodak gifted him the last roll of Kodachrome film to ever be produced by the company. McCurry shot the roll, which was processed in July 2010 by Dwayne's Photo in Parsons, Kansas. Most of these photos were published on the Internet by Vanity Fair. McCurry states, "I shot it for 30 years and I have several hundred thousand pictures on Kodachrome in my archive. I'm trying to shoot 36 pictures that act as some kind of wrap up – to mark the passing of Kodachrome. It was a wonderful film."

In 2015, he was hired by Microsoft to take photographs in areas of New Zealand, which were used as wallpapers in Windows 10.

In 2019, his book Steve McCurry. Animals was published by Taschen and is a compilation of his favorite photographs of animals.

=== Afghan Girl ===
McCurry took Afghan Girl in December 1984. It portrays an approximately 12-year-old Pashtun orphan in the Nasir Bagh refugee camp near Peshawar, Pakistan. McCurry found the girl when he heard "unexpected laughter" coming from children inside a one-room school tent for girls. "I noticed this one little girl with these incredible eyes, and I instantly knew that this was really the only picture I wanted to take," he says. This was the first time the girl had ever been photographed. The image was named as "the most recognized photograph" in the history of the National Geographic magazine, and was used as the cover photograph on the June 1985 issue. The photo has also been widely used on Amnesty International brochures, posters, and calendars. The identity of the "Afghan Girl" remained unknown for over 17 years until McCurry and a National Geographic team located the woman, Sharbat Gula, in 2002. McCurry said, "Her skin is weathered; there are wrinkles now, but she is as striking as she was all those years ago."

=== Afghan Girl controversy ===
In 2019, vlogger and professional photographer Tony Northrup released a research documentary accusing McCurry of obtaining the photograph under false pretenses, and endangering Gula's wellbeing in doing so. McCurry's publicity team responded by accusing Northrup of slander, and the clip was removed. Shortly thereafter, however, it was re-uploaded with a number of corrections, with an accompanying document that detailed a number of sources Northrup had obtained. Sharbat Gula herself had also previously provided some commentary on the photograph, published by BBC News in 2017.

=== Photo manipulation ===
In 2016 McCurry was accused of extensively manipulating his images with Photoshop and by other means, removing individuals and other elements.

In a May 2016 interview with PetaPixel, McCurry did not specifically deny making major changes, indicating that he now defines his work as "visual storytelling" and as "art". However, he subsequently added that others print and ship his images while he is travelling, implying that they were responsible for the significant manipulation. "That is what happened in this case. It goes without saying that what happened with this image was a mistake for which I have to take responsibility," he concluded.

When discussing the issue with a writer for Time's Lightbox website, McCurry provided similar comments about being a "visual storyteller", though without suggesting that the manipulation was done by others without his knowledge. In fact, the Time writer made the following statement, "Faced with mounting evidence of his own manipulations, McCurry has been forced to address his position in photography." In neither interview did he discuss when the heavy photo manipulation began, or which images have been manipulated. However, considering the controversy it has created, he said that "going forward, I am committed to only using the program in a minimal way, even for my own work taken on personal trips." McCurry also offered the following conclusion to Time Lightbox, "Reflecting on the situation ... even though I felt that I could do what I wanted to my own pictures in an aesthetic and compositional sense, I now understand how confusing it must be for people who think I'm still a photojournalist."

=== McCurry, NYC, 911 ===
In 2016 French comic writer Jean-David Morvan and South Korean artist Kim Jung Gi published a biographical graphic novel about Steve McCurry, titled McCurry, NYC, 911.

=== McCurry: The Pursuit of Color ===
In 2021, the documentary biopic entitled McCurry: The Pursuit of Color, directed by Denis Delestrac, produced by Intrepido Films and Polar Star Films and distributed by Dogwoof and Karma Films, was officially selected at the Doc NYC film festival (USA), Festival de Malaga (Spain), and Glasgow Film Festival (Scotland) amongst others. The Spanish cinema release was in June 2022.

== Awards ==
- 1987 – Medal of Honor for coverage of the 1986 Philippine Revolution, Philippines, White House News Photographers Association
- 1992 – First Place Nature and Environment Oil-Stricken Bird, Kuwait First Place, General News Stories: Kuwait after the Storm Children's Award: "Camels Under a Blackened SKy", World Press Photo Competition
- 1992 – Magazine Feature Picture Award of Excellence: Fiery Aliens First Place, Magazine Science Award: Camels Under A Blackended Sky First Place, Gulf News Sky: Kuwait After the Storm, Picture of the Year Competition
- 1992 – Oliver Pebbot Memorial Award: Best Photographic Reporting from Abroad on Golf War Coverage, Overseas Press Club
- 1993 – Award of Excellence for Rubble of War, National Press Photographers
- 1994 – Arts and Architecture Distinguished Alumni Award, Pennsylvania State University
- 1998 – Award of Excellence, Portraits: Red Boy, Picture of the Year Competition
- 2002 – Award of Excellence for "Women of Afghanistan"
- 2002 – Photographer of the Year
- 2003 – C-recipient of the New York Film Festival God for documentary, Afghan Girl Found
- 2003 – The Lucie Award for Photojournalism
- 2005 – Photojournalism Division – International Understanding through Photography award, Photographic Society of America
- 2006 – First Place, Buddha Rising, National Geographic, National Press Photographers Associate
- 2011 – Leica Hall of Fame Award
- 2014 – Photography of Appreciation Award
- 2018 – Golden Doves for Peace journalistic prize issued by the Italian Research Institute Archivio Disarmo
- 2019 – Induction into the International Photography Hall of Fame and Museum

== Exhibitions ==
- 2015–2016 – Steve McCurry: India, Rubin Museum of Art, New York
- 2015–2016 – Steve McCurry – Icons and Women, Musei di San Domenico, Forlì, Italy
- 2016 – Steve McCurry: The Iconic Photographs, Sundaram Tagore Gallery, Hong Kong
- 2016 – The World Through His Lens: Steve McCurry Photographs, New York, United States
- 2017 – The World of Steve McCurry, Brussels, Belgium
- 2018 – Steve McCurry Icons, Pavia, Italy
- 2018 – 'S Wanderful-Making Pictures – Steve McCurry Solo Exhibition, Taipei, Taiwan
- 2019 – "Le Monde de Steve McCurry", La Sucrière, Lyon, France
- 2019 – "Steve's House : permanent exhibition", Kashan, Iran
- 2019 – "Food", Musei di San Domenico, Forlì, Italy

== Publications ==
- Theroux, Paul (1985). The Imperial Way. Photographs by Steve McCurry. Boston: Houghton Mifflin. ISBN 978-0-395-39390-1.
- McCurry, Steve (1988). Monsoon. London: Thames & Hudson. ISBN 978-0-500-27850-5.
- —— (1999). Portraits. London: Phaidon Press. ISBN 978-0-7148-3839-7.
- —— (2000). South Southeast. London: Phaidon Press. ISBN 978-0-7148-3938-7.
- —— (2002). Sanctuary: The Temples of Angkor. London: Phaidon Press. ISBN 978-0-7148-4559-3.
- —— (2003). The Path to Buddha: A Tibetan Pilgrimage. London: Phaidon Press. ISBN 978-0-7148-6314-6.
- Bannon, Anthony; —— (2011). Steve McCurry. Phaidon 55. London: Phaidon Press. ISBN 978-0-7148-6259-0.
- —— (2006). Looking East: Portraits. London: Phaidon Press. ISBN 978-0-7148-4637-8.
- —— (2007). In the Shadow of Mountains. London: Phaidon Press. ISBN 978-0-7148-4640-8.
- —— (2009). The Unguarded Moment. London: Phaidon Press. ISBN 978-0-7148-4664-4.
- —— (2012). The Iconic Photographs. London: Phaidon Press. ISBN 978-0-7148-6513-3.
- —— (2013). Steve McCurry Untold: The Stories Behind the Photographs. London: Phaidon Press. ISBN 978-0-7148-6462-4.
- —— (2015). From These Hands: A Journey Along the Coffee Trail. London: Phaidon Press. ISBN 978-0-7148-6898-1.
- —— (2017). Afghanistan. Cologne: Taschen. ISBN 978-3-8365-6936-1.
- McCurry, Steve; —— (2018). Steve McCurry: A Life in Pictures. London: Laurence King Publishing. ISBN 978-1-78627-235-5.
- —— (2020). Steve McCurry In Search of Elsewhere: The Unseen Images. London: Laurence King Publishing. ISBN 978-1-78627-917-0.
- —— (2021). Belonging: Portraits from LGBTQ Thailand. New York: The New Press. ISBN 978-1-62097-655-5.
