= National Geographic =

American monthly magazine

- Cover of the October 2023 special issue
- Editor: Nathan Lump
- Categories: Geography, history, nature, science, world culture
- Frequency: Monthly
- Total circulation: 1,980,103 (United States) (2024)
- Founded: January 13, 1888; 138 years ago
- First issue: September 22, 1888; 138 years ago
- Company: NG Media; (National Geographic Partners/; Disney Publishing Worldwide)
- Country: United States
- Based in: Washington, D.C., U.S.
- Language: English and various other languages
- Website: nationalgeographic.com/magazine/
- ISSN: 0027-9358
- OCLC: 643483454

National Geographic (formerly The National Geographic Magazine, sometimes branded as Nat Geo) is an American monthly magazine published by National Geographic Partners and is based in Washington, DC. The magazine was founded in 1888 as a scholarly journal, nine months after the establishment of the society, but is now a popular magazine. In 1905, it began including pictures, a style for which it became well known. Its first color photos appeared in the 1910s. During the Cold War, the magazine committed itself to presenting a balanced view of the physical and human geography of countries beyond the Iron Curtain. Later, the magazine became outspoken on environmental issues.

Until 2015, the magazine was completely owned and managed by the National Geographic Society. Since 2015, controlling interest has been held by National Geographic Partners. Topics of features generally concern geography, history, nature, science, and world culture. The magazine is well known for its distinctive appearance: a thick square-bound glossy format with a yellow rectangular border. Map supplements from National Geographic Maps are included with subscriptions, and it is available in a traditional printed edition and an interactive online edition.

As of 1995, the magazine was circulated worldwide in nearly forty local-language editions and had a global circulation of at least 6.5 million per month including 3.5 million within the U.S., down from about 12 million in the late 1980s. As of 2015, the magazine had won 25 National Magazine Awards. In 2023, National Geographic laid off all staff writers and announced they would stop U.S. newsstand sales in the next year. As of November 2024, its Instagram page has 280 million followers, the third most of any account not belonging to an individual celebrity. The magazine's combined U.S. and international circulation as of June 30, 2024, was about 1.65 million, with its children's magazines separately achieving a circulation of about 500,000.

== History ==
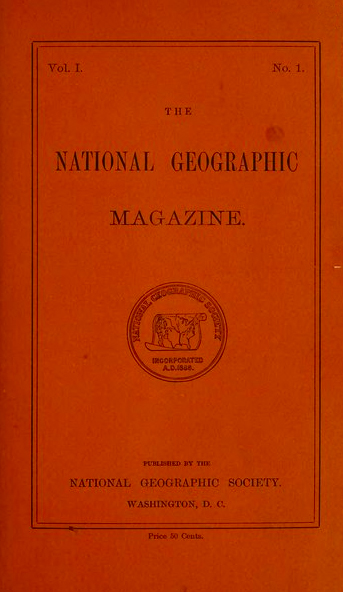
Front cover from the first edition of The National Geographic Magazine, c. September 1888

The first issue of the National Geographic Magazine was published on September 22, 1888, eight months after the Society was founded. In the first issue, Gardiner Greene Hubbard writes,

The "National Geographic Society" has been organized to "increase and defuse geographic knowledge", and the publication of a Magazine has been determined upon as one means accomplishing these purposes.

It was initially a scholarly journal sent to 165 charter members; in 2010, it reached the hands of 40 million people each month. Starting with its January 1905 publication of several full-page pictures of Tibet in 1900–01, the magazine began to transition from being a text-oriented publication to featuring extensive pictorial content. By 1908 more than half of the magazine's pages were photographs. The June 1985 cover portrait of a twelve-year-old Afghan girl Sharbat Gula, shot by photographer Steve McCurry, became one of the magazine's most recognizable images.

In 1965, the National Geographic Society begin producing TV specials on CBS, in partnership with Wolper Productions, called the National Geographic Specials. The first special became a ratings hit. The specials moved to ABC in 1973, then PBS in 1975 and WQED took over from Wolper Productions. National Geographic split from WQED in 1992. The specials moved to NBC in 1994, and remained there until 2000.

National Geographic Kids, the children's version of the magazine, was launched in 1975 under the name National Geographic World.

At its peak in the late 1980s, the magazine had 12 million subscribers in the United States, and millions more outside of the U.S.

In the late 1990s, the magazine began publishing The Complete National Geographic, an electronic collection of every past issue of the magazine. It was then sued over copyright of the magazine as a collective work in Greenberg v. National Geographic and other cases, and temporarily withdrew the compilation. The magazine eventually prevailed in the dispute, and in July 2009 resumed publishing all past issues through December 2008. More recent issues were later added to the collection; the archive and electronic edition of the magazine are available online to the magazine's subscribers.

In September 2015, the National Geographic Society moved the magazine to a new owner, National Geographic Partners, giving 21st Century Fox a 73% controlling interest in exchange for $725 million. In December 2017, a deal was announced for Disney to acquire 21st Century Fox, including the controlling interest in National Geographic Partners. The acquisition was completed in March 2019. NG Media publishing unit was operationally transferred into Disney Publishing Worldwide.

In September 2022, the magazine laid off six of its top editors. In June 2023, the magazine laid off all of its staff writers, shifting to an entirely freelance-based writing model, and announced that beginning in 2024 it would no longer offer newsstand purchases.

On 26 June 2026, the National Geographic Society opened the National Geographic Museum of Exploration in Washington, D.C.

== Administration ==
=== Editors-in-chief ===
The magazine had a single "editor" from 1888 to 1920. From 1920 to 1967, the chief editorship was held by the president of the National Geographic Society. Since 1967, the magazine has been overseen by its own "editor" and/or "editor-in-chief". The list of editors-in-chief includes three generations of the Grosvenor family between 1903 and 1980.

- Gilbert Hovey Grosvenor (1875–1966): (editor-in-chief: February 1903 – January 1920; managing editor: September 1900 – February 1903; assistant editor: May 1899 – September 1900)
- John Oliver La Gorce (1879–1959): (May 1954 – January 1957) (president of the society at the same time)
- Melville Bell Grosvenor (1901–1982): (January 1957 – August 1967) (president of the society at the same time) (thereafter editor-in-chief to 1977)
- Frederick Vosburgh (1905–2005): (August 1967 – October 1970)
- Gilbert Melville Grosvenor (born 1931): (October 1970 – July 1980) (then became president of the society)
- Wilbur E. Garrett: (July 1980 – April 1990)
- William Graves: (April 1990 – December 1994)
- William L. Allen: (January 1995 – January 2005)
- Chris Johns: (January 2005 – April 2014) (first "editor-in-chief" since MBG)
- Susan Goldberg: (April 2014 – April 2022)
- Nathan Lump: (May 2022 – present)

== Articles ==
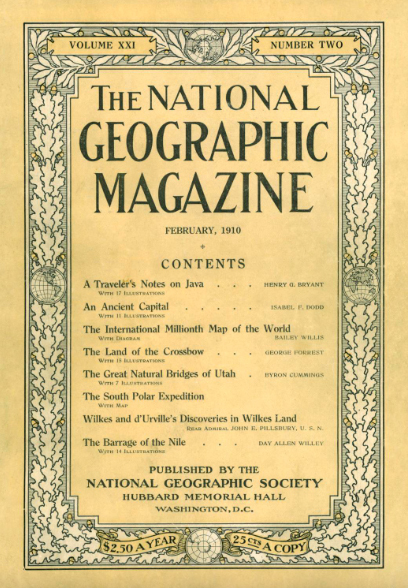
The first issue of The National Geographic Magazine featuring the oak leaf perimeter and yellow border. c. February 1910

During the Cold War, the magazine committed itself to present a balanced view of the physical and human geography of countries beyond the Iron Curtain. The magazine printed articles on Berlin, de-occupied Austria, the Soviet Union, and Communist China that deliberately downplayed politics to focus on culture. In its coverage of the Space Race, National Geographic focused on the scientific achievement while largely avoiding reference to the race's connection to nuclear arms buildup. There were also many articles in the 1930s, 1940s and 1950s about the individual states and their resources, along with supplementary maps of each state. Many of these articles were written by longtime staff such as Frederick Simpich.

After 21st Century Fox acquired controlling interest in the magazine, articles became outspoken on topics such as environmental issues, deforestation, chemical pollution, global warming, and endangered species. Series of articles were included focusing on the history and varied uses of specific products such as a single metal, gem, food crop, or agricultural product, or an archaeological discovery. Occasionally an entire month's issue would be devoted to a single country, past civilization, a natural resource whose future is endangered, or other themes. In recent decades, the National Geographic Society has unveiled other magazines with different focuses. Whereas the magazine featured lengthy expositions in the past, recent issues have included shorter articles.

== Photography ==
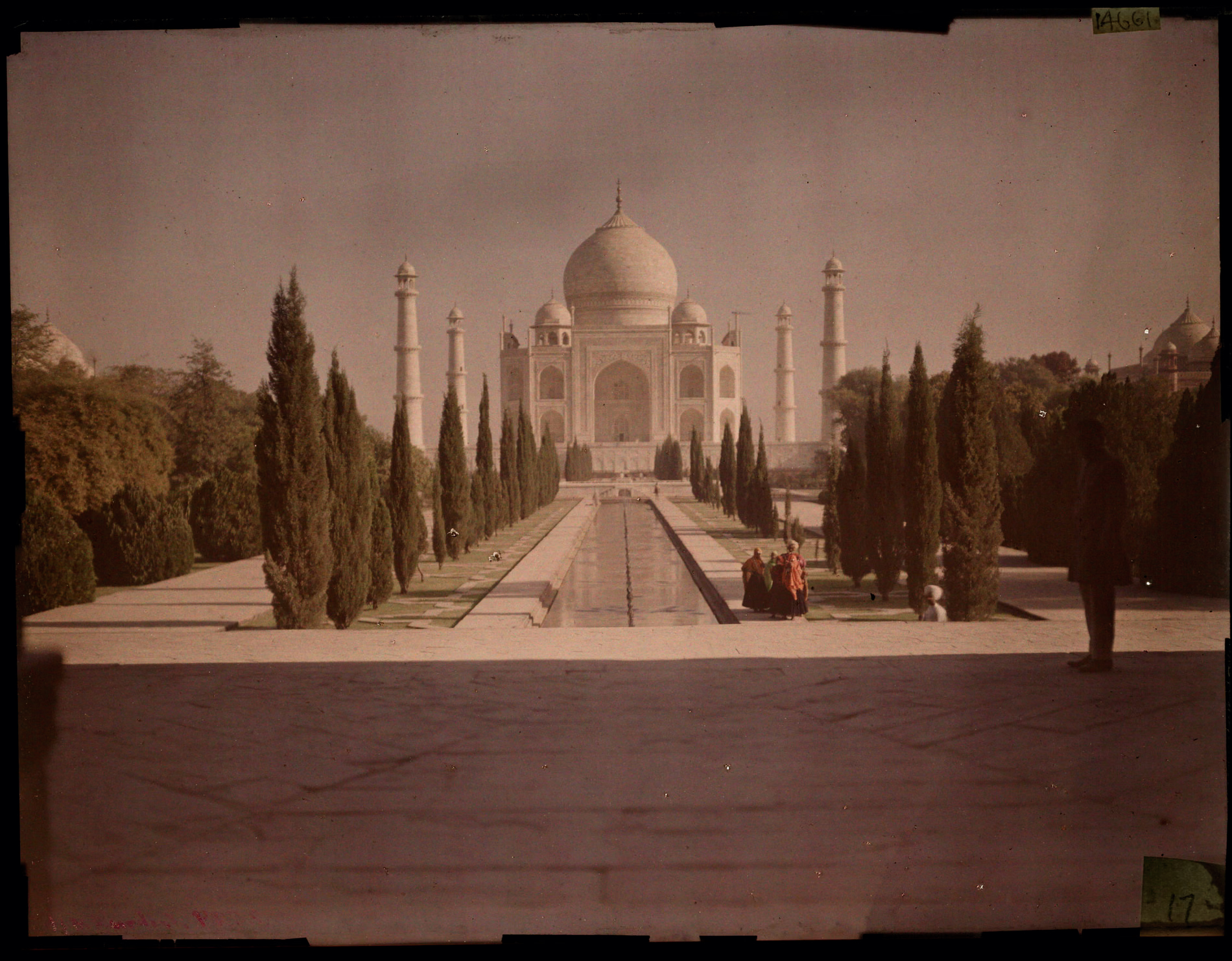
Color photograph of the Taj Mahal (1914). Source: The National Geographic Magazine, March 1921

In addition to being well known for articles about scenery, history, and the most distant corners of the world, the magazine has been recognized for its book-like quality and the high standard of its photography. It was during the tenure of Society President Alexander Graham Bell and editor Gilbert H. Grosvenor (GHG) that the significance of illustration was first emphasized, in spite of criticism from some of the Board of Managers who considered the many illustrations an indicator of an "unscientific" conception of geography. By 1910, photographs had become the magazine's trademark and Grosvenor was constantly on the search for "dynamical pictures" as Graham Bell called them, particularly those that provided a sense of motion in a still image. In 1915, GHG began building the group of staff photographers and providing them with advanced tools including the latest darkroom.

The magazine began to feature some pages of color photography in the early 1930s, when this technology was still in its early development. During the mid-1930s, Luis Marden (1913–2003), a writer and photographer for National Geographic, convinced the magazine to allow its photographers to use the so-called "miniature" 35 mm Leica cameras loaded with Kodachrome film over bulkier cameras with heavy glass plates that required the use of tripods. In 1959, the magazine started publishing small photographs on its covers, later becoming larger photographs. National Geographic photography quickly shifted to digital photography for both its printed magazine and its website. In subsequent years, the cover, while keeping its yellow border, shed its oak leaf trim and bare table of contents, to allow for a full-page photograph taken for one of the month's articles. Issues of National Geographic are often kept by subscribers for years and re-sold at thrift stores as collectibles. The standard for photography has remained high over the subsequent decades and the magazine is still illustrated with some of the highest-quality photojournalism in the world. In 2006, National Geographic began an international photography competition, with more than eighteen countries participating.

=== Gallery ===
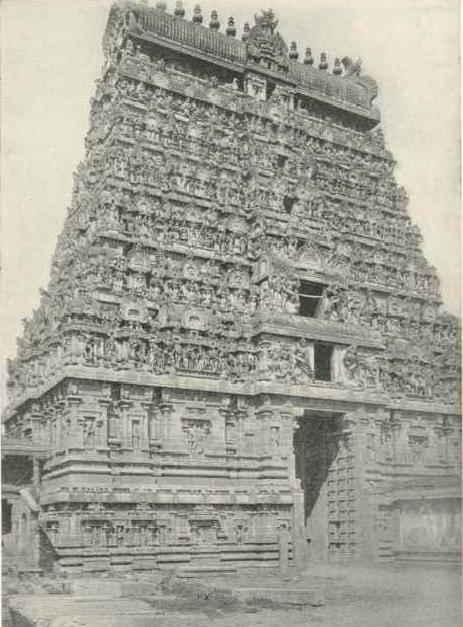
Srirangam Temple, India (National Geographic Magazine, November 1909)

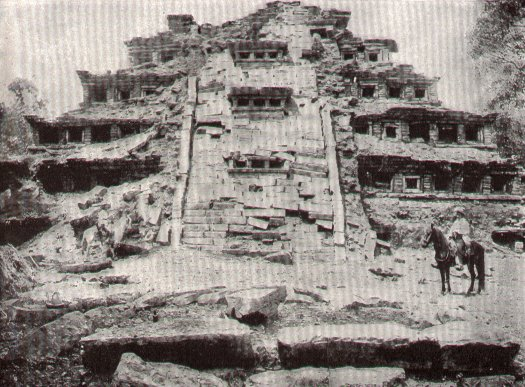
Pyramid of the Niches, El Tajín (National Geographic Magazine, February 1913)

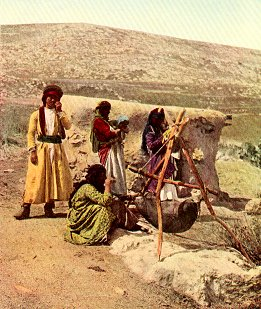
Traditional butter making in Palestine (National Geographic Magazine, March 1914)

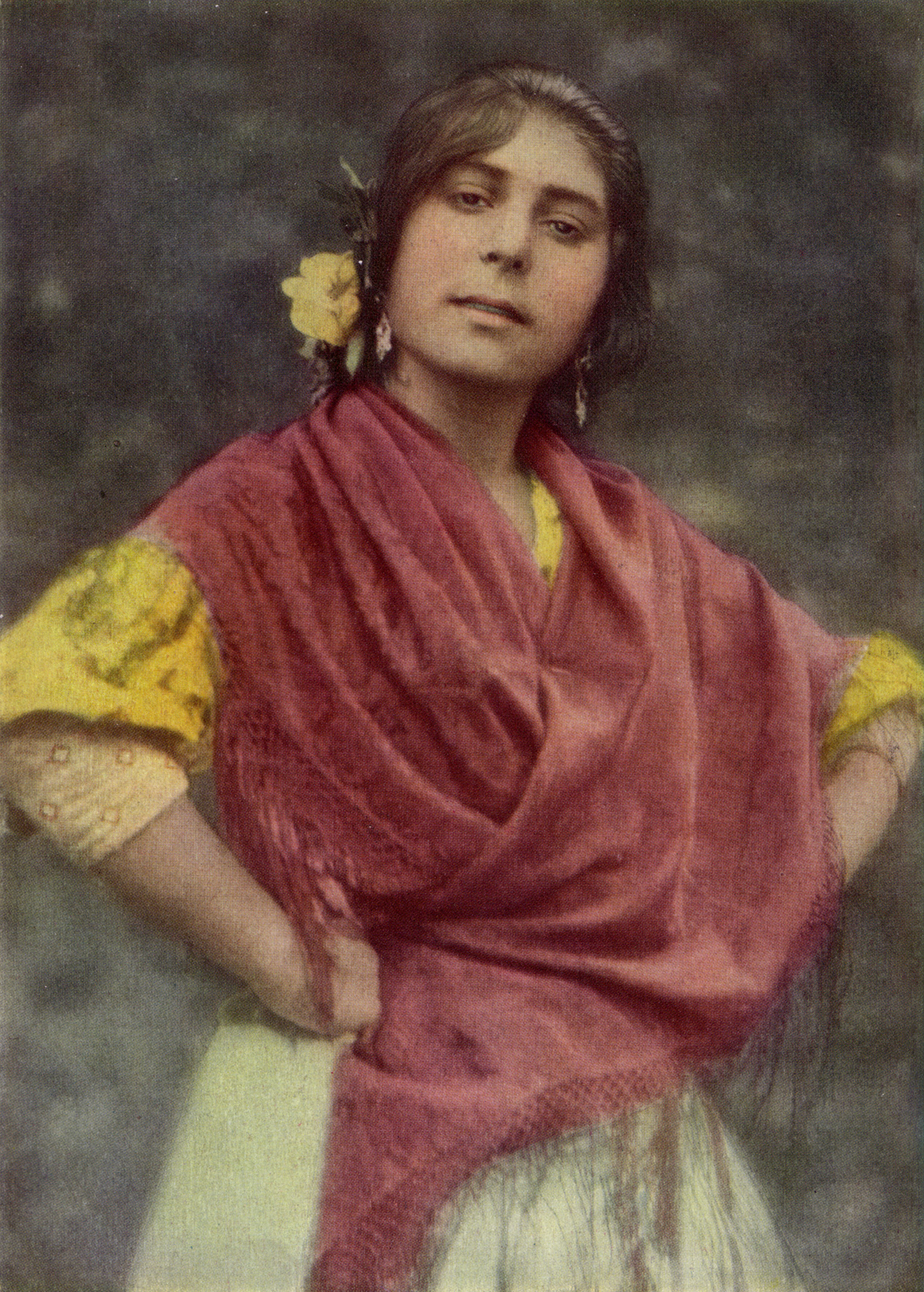
Spanish Gypsy (National Geographic Magazine, March 1917)

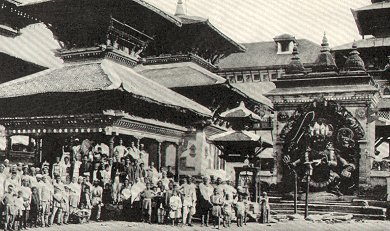
Kathmandu Market (National Geographic Magazine, October 1920)

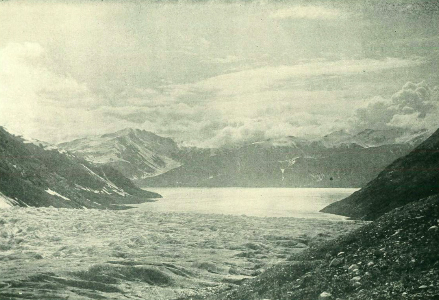
A photo of a glacier taken on an expedition to the North Pole (National Geographic Magazine, January 1910)

== Map supplement ==
"A map is the greatest of all epic poems. Its lines and colors show the realization of great dreams."

— Gilbert H. Grosvenor^{f}

Supplementing the articles, the magazine sometimes provides maps of the regions visited. National Geographic Maps (originally the Cartographic Division) became a division of the National Geographic Society in 1915. The first supplement map, which appeared in the May 1918 issue of the magazine, titled The Western Theatre of War, served as a reference for overseas military personnel and soldiers' families alike. On some occasions, the Society's map archives have been used by the United States government in instances where its own cartographic resources were limited. President Franklin D. Roosevelt's White House map room was filled with National Geographic maps. A National Geographic map of Europe is featured in the displays of the Winston Churchill museum in London showing Churchill's markings at the Yalta Conference where the Allied leaders divided post-war Europe.

In 2001, National Geographic released an eight-CD-ROM set containing all its maps from 1888 to December 2000. Printed versions are also available from the National Geographic website.

== Language editions ==
=== Active ===
In April 1995, National Geographic began publishing in Japanese, its first local language edition. The magazine is currently published in 29 local editions around the world.

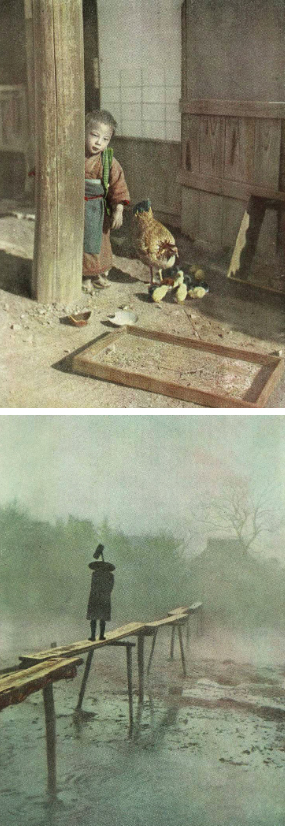
Eliza R. Scidmore was the first woman to photograph for the magazine. Japanese people. 1914.

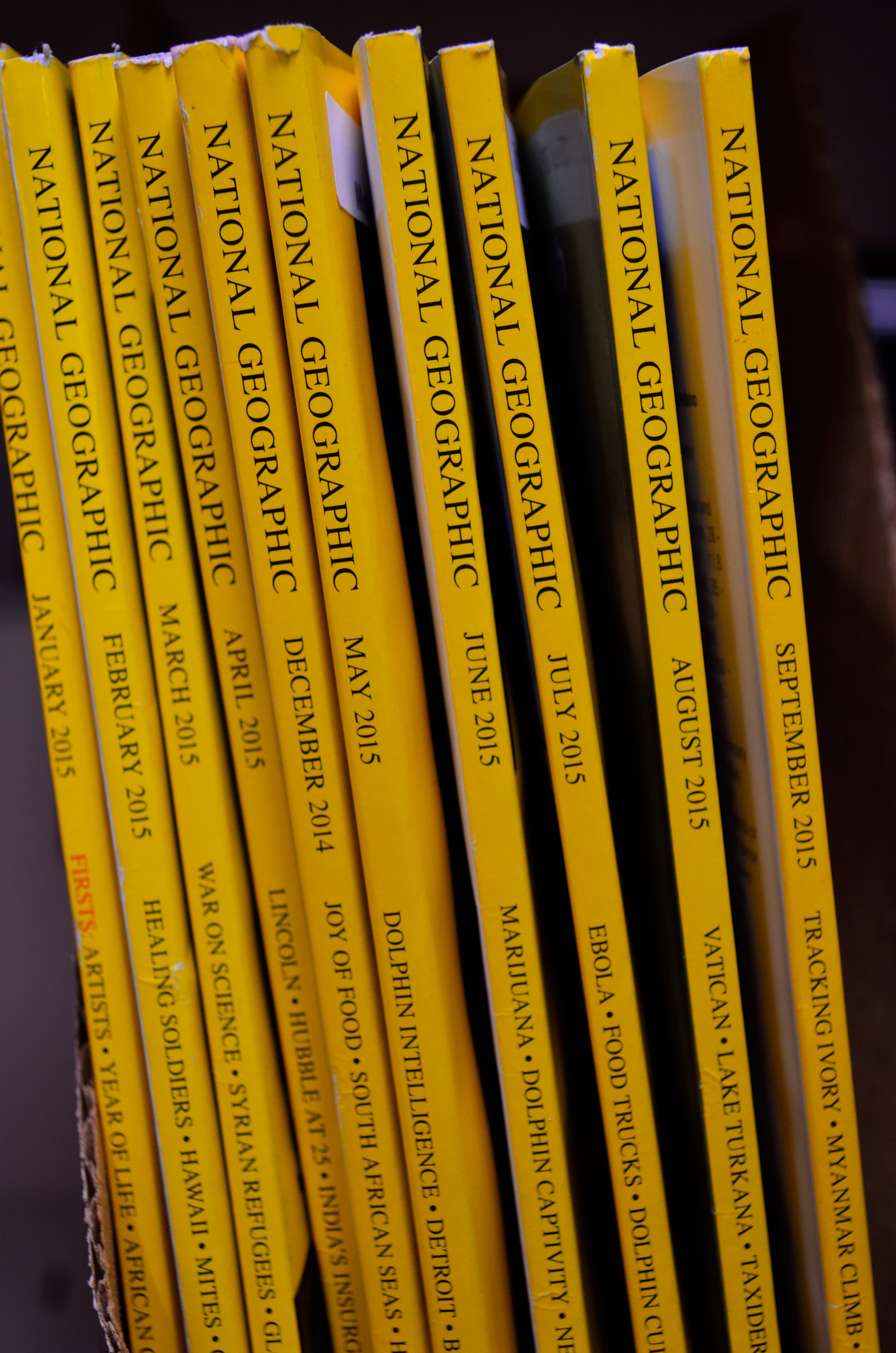
National Geographic English editions from 2015

Active language editions
Language	Website	Editor-in-chief
English	ngm.com	Nathan Lump
Arabic	ngalarabiya.com	Hussain AlMoosawi
Bulgarian	nationalgeographic.bg	Tatiana Grigorova
Chinese	nationalgeographic.com.cn	Tianrang Mai
Chinese	natgeomedia.com/	Yungshih Lee
Czech	national-geographic.cz	Tomáš Tureček
Dutch	nationalgeographic.nl	Robbert Vermue
French	nationalgeographic.fr	Frédéric Vallois
Georgian	nationalgeographic.ge	Ketevan Chumburidze
German	nationalgeographic.de	Werner Siefer
Hungarian	ng.hu	Tamás Vitray
Hebrew	nationalgeographic.co.il	Mirit Friedman
Indonesian	nationalgeographic.grid.id	Didi Kaspi Kasim
Italian	nationalgeographic.it	Marco Cattaneo
Japanese	nationalgeographic.jp	Shigeo Otsuka
Kazakh	nationalgeographic.kz	Yerkin Zhakipov
Korean	nationalgeographic.co.kr	Junemo Kim
Lithuanian	nationalgeographic.lt	Frederikas Jansonas
Polish	nationalgeographic.pl	Łukasz Załuski
Portuguese	nationalgeographic.pt	Gonçalo Pereira
Slovene	nationalgeographic.si	Marija Javornik
Spanish	nationalgeographicla.com	Robero Morani
Spanish	ngenespanol.com	Alicia Guzmán
Spanish	nationalgeographic.com.es	Gonçalo Pereira
Thai	ngthai.com	Kowit Phadungruangkij

=== Discontinued ===
The following local-language editions have been discontinued.

Discontinued language editions
Language	Website
Mongolian	nationalgeographic.mn
Greek	nationalgeographic.gr
Ukrainian	
Azerbaijani	nationalgeographic.az
Latvian	nationalgeographic.lv
Farsi	www.ngmfarsi.com
Portuguese	nationalgeographicbrasil.com
Danish	natgeo.dk
Norwegian	natgeo.no
Swedish	natgeo.se
Finnish	natgeo.fi
Romanian	natgeo.ro
Estonian	
Russian	
Turkish	nationalgeographic.com.tr
Croatian	
Serbian	nationalgeographic.rs

In association with Trends Publications in Beijing and IDG Asia, National Geographic has been authorized for "copyright cooperation" in China to publish the yellow-border magazine, which launched with the July 2007 issue of the magazine with an event in Beijing on July 10, 2007, and another event on December 6, 2007, in Beijing also celebrating the 29th anniversary of normalization of U.S.–China relations featuring former President Jimmy Carter. The mainland China version is one of the two local-language editions that bump the National Geographic logo off its header in favor of a local-language logo; the other one is the Persian version published under the name Gita Nama.

In April 2022, due to the Russian invasion of Ukraine, the Russian version of National Geographic was discontinued. Its publication team then launched the Russian Traveler, which is not associated with the National Geographic brand.

== Distribution ==
In the United States, National Geographic is available only to subscribers beginning with the January 2024 issue. For the first 110 years of the magazine's existence, membership in the National Geographic Society was the only way to receive it. Newsstand sales, which began in 1998, ceased in 2023, following a year of layoffs and a shift in focus to digital formats amid the decline of the print media industry.

Worldwide editions are sold on newsstands in addition to regular subscriptions. In several countries, such as Hungary, Slovenia, Croatia, Turkey and Ukraine, National Geographic paved the way for a subscription model in addition to traditional newsstand sales.

In Mexico, National Geographic en Español magazine stopped its printing with the February 2025 issue.

== Awards ==
On May 1, 2008, National Geographic won three National Magazine Awards—an award solely for its written content—in the reporting category for an article by Peter Hessler on the Chinese economy; an award in the photojournalism category for work by John Stanmeyer on malaria in the Third World; and a prestigious award for general excellence.

Between 1980 and 2011, the magazine has won a total of 24 National Magazine Awards.

In May 2006, 2007, and 2011, National Geographic magazine won the American Society of Magazine Editors' General Excellence Award in the over two million circulation category. In 2010, National Geographic Magazine received the top ASME awards for photojournalism and essay. In 2011, National Geographic Magazine received the top-award from ASME – the Magazine of the Year Award.

In April 2014, National Geographic received the National Magazine Award ("Ellie") for best tablet edition for its multimedia presentation of Robert Draper's story "The Last Chase", about the final days of a tornado researcher who was killed in the line of duty.

In February 2017, National Geographic received the National Magazine Award ("Ellie") for best website. National Geographic won the 2020 Webby Award for News & Magazines in the category Apps, Mobile & Voice. National Geographic won the 2020 Webby Award and Webby People's Voice Award for Magazine in the category Web.

== Controversies ==
On the magazine's February 1982 cover, the pyramids of Giza were altered, resulting in the first major scandal of the digital photography age and contributing to photography's "waning credibility".

The cover of the October 1988 issue featured a photo of an ivory bust of a male, whose authenticity, particularly the alleged ice age provenance, has been questioned.

In 1999, the magazine was embroiled in the Archaeoraptor scandal, in which it purported to have a fossil linking birds to dinosaurs. The fossil was a forgery.

In 2010, the magazine's Your Shot competition was awarded to American filmmaker and photographer William Lascelles for a photograph presented as a portrait of a dog with fighter jets flying over its shoulder. Lascelles had in reality created the image using photo editing software.

After the annexation of Crimea by the Russian Federation in 2014, National Geographic published maps with the Crimean peninsula marked as "contested", contrary to international norms.

In March 2018, the editor of National Geographic, Susan Goldberg, said that historically the magazine's coverage of people around the world had been racist. Goldberg stated that the magazine ignored non-white Americans and showed different groups as exotic, thereby promoting racial clichés. National Geographic even stated that "their coverage of people around the world was racist" Shortly after Goldberg's comment.

== List of National Geographic milestones ==
This is a list of National Geographic milestones featuring turning points in the magazine's history including writing and photography assignments, design aspects, cartography and sponsored expeditions.

Key
Writing and photography	Cartography	Sponsored expeditions	Design	Social / other

=== Writing and photography ===
Writing and photography
Year	Milestone	Notes	Ref
1888	First publication	The first issue of The National Geographic Magazine^{a} was published in October 1888 for the cost of fifty cents (USD), with an introductory address by the President of the magazine, Gardiner G. Hubbard.	
1890	First photograph of a natural scene	The first photograph of a natural scene was that of Herald Island in the Arctic, photographed by Assistant Paymaster J. Q. Lovell (USN) aboard the USS Thetis in the July issue of 1890.	
1908	Photography	More than half of the magazine's pages are photographs	
1914	First color photograph	The first color photograph to appear in the magazine (Autochrome) was in the July 1914 issue, that of a flower garden in Ghent, Belgium photographed by Paul G. Guillumette.	
1914	First article written by a female author	The first article written by a woman was published in the July 1914 issue by Eliza R. Scidmore, an account of Japan's youth titled Young Japan.	
1914	First photograph by a woman	The first image photographed (only the second in color, the first being in the same issue) by a woman was in the July 1914 issue by Eliza R. Scidmore, that of a young Japanese boy gazing at a chicken and her newborn hatchlings.	
1926	First natural photos underwater	The first natural underwater photograph was published in the January 1927 issue depicting a Hogfish in the Florida Keys. The pictures were photographed by Charles Martin and W. H. Longley.^{e}	
1930	First natural-color aerial photographs	Melville Bell Grosvenor captures the first published natural-color aerial photographs. The photo was taken aboard a Detroit ZMC-2 U.S. Navy airship and featured the Statue of Liberty in New York City. The publication was in the September 1930 issue of the magazine.	
1938	Use of 35 mm film	The first use of 35 mm film, produced by Kodak under the brand Kodachrome, was published in the April 1938 issue. The photographs were captured by Bob Moore, that of Austrian dancers and would be the preferred film stock for decades.	
1959	First photo on the cover	The first photograph on the magazine cover was on the July 1959 issue, a depiction of the 49-star flag of the United States after Alaska's induction into the United States, taken by B. Anthony Stewart.	
1960	1,750,000-year-old discovery	Louis and Mary Leakey report on the discovery of Zinjanthropus, a more than 1.75-million-year-old man-like species in the Hominin family. Published in the September issue of the magazine.	
1970	Stronger photojournalism	After astronauts took one of the first color full-disk photos of Earth from space in 1968, Gordon Young wrote an article highlighting the state of pollution on the planet. The article was published in the December 1970 issue, photographed by James P. Blair and marked a shift away from attractive photos and towards photo-journalistically stronger images.	
1985	Afghan Girl	Steve McCurry took the photo that was featured on the June 1985 issue of the magazine, that of Afghan Girl, a twelve-year-old Afghan refugee in Pakistan named Sharbat Gula. She had green eyes and her picture would become the most recognized photo from National Geographic.	
1985	RMS Titanic	After the Titanic was found in the Atlantic Ocean by Robert Ballard, he wrote the cover story for the December 1985 issue of the magazine titled "How we found the Titanic", documenting his experience.	
2002	Afghan Girl found	Seventeen years after her portrait appeared on the cover, Sharbat Gula, the Afghan Girl, was found at the age of twenty-nine in the mountains of Afghanistan. Her name was not known until this time.	
2003	First all digital photography in an article	The first all-digital photography within an article was titled "The Future of Flying", published in the December 2003 issue by Michael Klesius and photographed by Joe McNally. The cover story showcased the F/A-22 Raptor.	

=== Cartography ===
Writing and photography
Year	Milestone	Notes	Ref
1889	First photograph and first map	The first photograph was in the second-ever published issue, depicting a topographic relief map of Africa, in the April 1889 issue by Herbert G. Ogden.	
1889	First fold-out map	The first fold-out map was published in the October 1889 issue depicting the Meadow Creek Mountains in Tennessee along the French Broad River to Asheville, North Carolina.	
1890	First map of a hurricane	The first map of a hurricane was a drawing published in the May 1890 issue. It was a depiction of the September 1888 Atlantic hurricanes.^{d}	
1891	First color map	The first color map was a reproduction of South America by Dodd, Mead & Company, Publishers.	

=== Sponsored expeditions ===
Writing and photography
Year	Milestone	Notes	Ref
1890	First sponsored scientific expedition	The first sponsored scientific expedition started in 1890 and was published in the July 1902 issue. The expedition was led by Geologist Dr. Israel Russell who surveyed and mapped the Mount Saint Elias region in North America. During the voyage, Canada's highest peak, Mount Logan, was discovered.	
1909	Robert E. Peary discovers the North Pole	In a society sponsored expedition to the North Pole, explorer Robert E. Peary was the first to discover the region on April 6, 1909. The article featured accolades that were received and published in the January 1910 issue of the magazine.	
1929	First flight to the South Pole	The first flight to the South Pole was a National Geographic Society^{g} sponsored expedition. On November 29, 1929 Richard E. Byrd flew over the South Pole photographing more than 60,000 square miles of Antarctica from the air, which was featured in the August 1930 issue of the magazine.	
1952	First publication by underwater pioneer Jacques Cousteau	The magazine publishes first of many undersea articles by Jacques-Yves Cousteau. The name of the article was called "Fish Men Explore a New World Underwater" and was published in the October issue of 1952.	
1961	Jane Goodall's research on Chimpanzees	Jane Goodall starts her expedition and research on chimpanzees in Tanzania, Africa's Gombe Stream Park using funds from National Geographic.^{g} Her findings were published throughout the later half of the 20th century.	
1963	First Americans conquer Mt. Everest	In a National Geographic Society supported expedition,^{g} mountaineer Jim Whittaker was the first American to conquer Mount Everest	
1967	Dian Fossey studies gorillas	Dian Fossey begins a long-term Society-funded study of mountain gorillas in Rwanda, Africa.	
1978	Koko the gorilla learns sign-language	Sign-language skills of Koko the gorilla, following six years of National Geographic Society-funded training by Francine Patterson, was reported in the October 1978 issue of the magazine.	
2012	James Cameron and the Mariana Trench	James Cameron becomes first person to dive solo to the Mariana Trench in the Deepsea Challenger, a joint scientific expedition to conduct deep-ocean research.	

=== Design ===
Writing and photography
Year	Milestone	Notes	Ref
1896	Monthly magazine and design change	In January 1896 the magazine started featuring titles of articles on the front cover and began publishing the magazine on a monthly basis.	
1910	Front cover design change	In the February 1910 issue, the design of the front cover changed to a yellow oak leaf border illustration featuring a yellow border; with the exception of a few background color and font changes, this would be the primary design through June 1959.	
1959	Small images on the front cover	In the July 1959 issue, the magazine started including small photos on the front cover.	
1959	Exclusion of the word "Magazine"	In the December 1959 issue, the word "Magazine" was excluded from the title. In January and February 1960 the publication was called "The National Geographic". By March 1960 the magazine was simply titled National Geographic.	
1962	Large images on the front cover	In the January 1962 issue, the magazine started including large photos, enveloping the entire cover.	
1979	No more oak leaf on the cover	The September 1979 issue was the first time the magazine dropped the oak leaf border from the cover, making the yellow border more visibly noticeable.	

=== Social/other ===
Writing and photography
Year	Milestone	Notes	Ref
1941	Efforts of WWII	National Geographic Society gives access of photographs, maps, and cartographic details to U.S. President Franklin D. Roosevelt to help with the war efforts of WWII.	
1945	Efforts of Korean War	U.S. Forces colonels Dean Rusk and Charles Bonesteel partitioned the Korean peninsula along the 38th parallel with a National Geographic map.	
1962	The Society's flag in space.	John Glenn transports the National Geographic Society's flag on first U.S. orbital space flight aboard NASA's Mercury-Atlas 6.	
1969	The Society's flag on the moon	Apollo 11 astronauts transport the National Geographic Society's flag to the moon.	
1996	Website launch	nationalgeographic.com is launched on the World Wide Web	
2018	Racism acknowledgment	Editor-in-chief Susan Goldberg admitted publicly, "For decades, our coverage was racist. To rise above our past, we must acknowledge it".	
2023	Discontinuance of newsstand sales	In June 2023 parent company Disney announced that it would be discontinuing sales of its publication on newsstands in the United States.	

== See also ==
- National Geographic Kids
- National Geographic Traveler
- List of National Geographic cover stories

== Notes ==
a. The National Geographic Magazine was the publication's name until December 1959, after which it was simply called "National Geographic".
b. Photograph not credited in the magazine, but is at the preceding reference
c. Multiple articles, multiple authors
d. Uncredited image
e. Two photographers credited, it is not stated which one took the photo.
f. This article incorporates text from this source, which is in the public domain.
g. As well as other sponsors
