= National Geographic Maps =

Division of the National Geographic Society

National Geographic Maps, founded in 1915, is the commercial map publishing division of National Geographic, part of a joint venture between the Walt Disney Company and the National Geographic Society. Initially the in-house cartographic studio for National Geographic Magazine, National Geographic Maps is now responsible for the creation and distribution of commercial map products including printed wall maps and folded travel and outdoor recreation maps, and digital versions of its printed maps that are licensed for use in other products and publications.

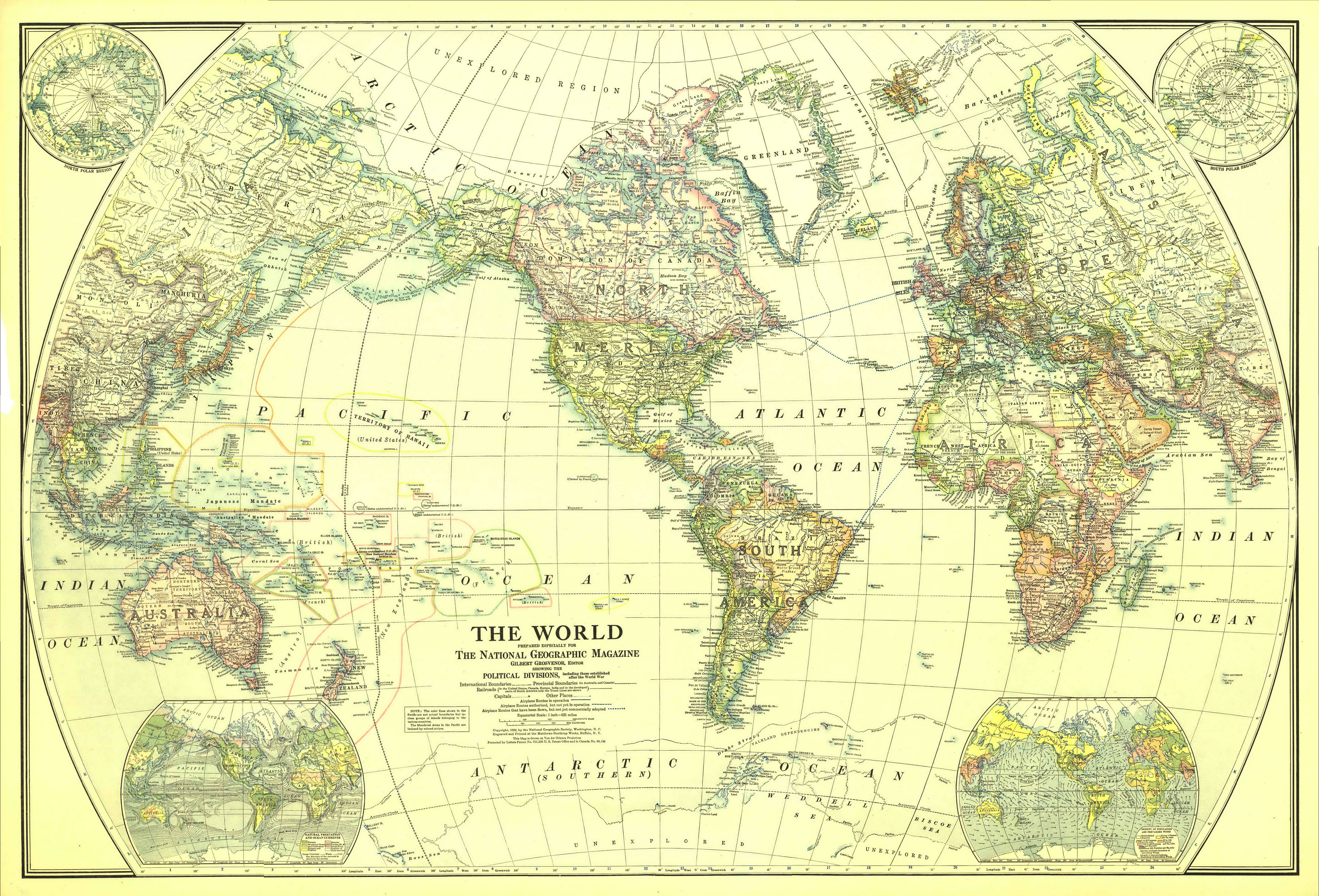
World map published in National Geographic magazine in December 1922

Other divisions and groups within National Geographic Partners and National Geographic Society also create and distribute maps in their publications, including the National Geographic Magazine and Books divisions, but not within the commercial map publishing industry. Within the Walt Disney Company, National Geographic Maps is a division and imprint of Disney Publishing Worldwide, the publishing subsidiary of Disney Parks, Experiences and Products.

National Geographic Maps is based in Evergreen, Colorado, where it has maintained business offices, a map warehouse, and a cartographic studio since National Geographic acquired the Trails Illustrated trail map brand and assets in January 1997. Prior to that it was based in Washington, D.C., and its suburbs.
