= Aran Safir =

American ophthalmologist and inventor

- Born: March 29, 1926; New York City, New York, US
- Died: January 27, 2007 (aged 80)
- Education: New York University
- Known for: Iris recognition scanner
- Medical career
- Field: Ophthalmology
- Institutions: University of Connecticut

Aran Safir (March 29, 1926 – January 21, 2007) was an American ophthalmologist and inventor. He is known for inventing a groundbreaking iris recognition scanner. This technology has been widely adopted in the security sector, ranging from the U.S. Department of Homeland Security to Google. The invention was patented on February 3, 1987, and expired in the United States in 2005. Safir and his co-inventor, Leonard Flom, were inducted into the National Inventors Hall of Fame in 2013.

Born in New York City, Safir received his undergraduate and medical degrees from New York University. In the 1960s, he received his first patent for an early electronic retinoscope. Safir served on the faculty at the Mount Sinai School of Medicine and also served as chief of ophthalmology at the University of Connecticut before retiring in 1989.
