= Nasir Bagh =

Former Afghan refugee camp near Peshawar, Pakistan

Coordinates: 34°02′N 71°25′E

Nasir Bagh (Pashto: ناصر باغ; Dari: باغ‌ ونصیر) was an Afghan refugee camp located on the edge of Peshawar in what is now Pakistan's Khyber Pakhtunkhwa province. It opened in 1980 in what was then the North-West Frontier Province of Pakistan following the outbreak of the Soviet-Afghan War and at one time had a population of 100,000 refugees. In 2002 the government of Pakistan decided to close a number of camps in Pakistan,, Nasir Bagh camp was thus closed down by UNHCR in May 2002, with most refugees returning to Afghanistan (the Taliban were ousted by then) and the remaining moving to other camps in the region.

== The Nasir Bagh Project ==
As part of the Peshawar Beautification Plan, the reconstruction and restoration project of Nasir Bagh road was given to Frontier Works Organization. Some portions of the project are not yet completed.

== Housing Societies ==
Today Nasir Bagh road is a home various housing societies some of which includes

- Defence Housing Authority Peshawar
- Regi Model Town
- Askari
- Police Colony
- Professor Model Town
- Sheikh Yaseen Town
- University Model Town
