= John Daugman =

John Daugman OBE FREng
- Born: 17 February 1954
- Died: 11 June 2024 (aged 70)
- Citizenship: British and American
- Education: Harvard University (AB, PhD)
- Known for: Vision theory and pattern recognition; 2D wavelet encodings; iris recognition algorithm
- Awards: Order of the British Empire (OBE); FREng: Fellow of the Royal Academy of Engineering; FNAI: Fellow of the US National Academy of Inventors; FBCS: Fellow of the British Computer Society; FIMA: Fellow of the Institute of Mathematics and its Applications; FIAPR: Fellow of the International Association for Pattern Recognition; PYIA: NSF Presidential Young Investigator Award; Induction into the US National Inventors Hall of Fame
- Scientific career
- Fields: Computer vision; pattern recognition; biometrics
- Workplaces: Harvard University; University of Cambridge; University of Groningen; Tokyo Institute of Technology
- Website: www.cl.cam.ac.uk/~jgd1000/

John Gustav Daugman OBE FREng (17 February 1954 – 11 June 2024) was a British-American professor of computer vision and pattern recognition at the University of Cambridge. His major research contributions have been in computational neuroscience, pattern recognition, and in computer vision with the original development of wavelet methods for image encoding and analysis. He invented the IrisCode, a 2D Gabor wavelet-based iris recognition algorithm that is the basis of all publicly deployed automatic iris recognition systems and which has registered more than 1.5 billion persons worldwide in government ID programs.

== Education and early life ==
The son of émigrés Josef Petros Daugmanis from Latvia and Runa Inge Olsson from Sweden, John Daugman was educated in America, receiving an A.B. degree and a PhD degree (1983) from Harvard University.

== Career and research ==
Following his PhD, Daugman held a post-doctoral fellowship, then taught at Harvard for five years. After short appointments in Germany and Japan, he joined the University of Cambridge in England to research and to teach computer vision, neural computing, information theory, and pattern recognition. He held the Johann Bernoulli Chair of Mathematics and Informatics at the University of Groningen in the Netherlands, and the Toshiba Endowed Chair at the Tokyo Institute of Technology in Japan before becoming Professor at Cambridge.

=== Iris recognition algorithm ===
Daugman filed for a patent for his iris recognition algorithm in 1991 while working at the University of Cambridge. The algorithm was first commercialized in the late 1990s. His algorithm automatically recognizes persons in real-time by encoding the random patterns visible in the iris of the eye from some distance, and applying a powerful test of statistical independence. It is used in many identification applications such as the Unique IDentification Authority of India (UIDAI) for registering all 1.3 billion citizens of India for government services and entitlements, border crossing controls in United Arab Emirates and passport-free immigration in the UK, the Netherlands, United States, Canada, and other countries.

Daugman's algorithm uses a 2D Gabor wavelet transform to extract the phase structure of the iris. This is encoded into a very compact bit stream, the IrisCode, that is stored in a database for identification at search speeds of millions of iris patterns per second per single CPU core.

== Awards and honours ==
Daugman has received several awards, including:

- Presidential Young Investigator Award from the US National Science Foundation
- Information Technology Award and Medal from the British Computer Society
- "Millennium Product" Award from the UK Design Council
- "Time 100" Innovators Award
- OBE, Order of the British Empire, from Queen Elizabeth II
- Fellow of the Institute of Mathematics and its Applications (FIMA) (2011)
- Fellow of the International Association for Pattern Recognition (FIAPR) (2012)
- Fellow of the US National Academy of Inventors (FNAI) (2015)
- Fellow of the British Computer Society (FBCS) and CEng (2015)
- Fellow of the Royal Academy of Engineering (FREng) (2015)
- Inducted into the US National Inventors Hall of Fame
