= List of National Geographic cover stories (1970s) =

National Geographic logo

National Geographic is an American magazine that is noted for its cover stories and accompanying photography. Throughout the 1970s National Geographic's cover stories showcased global historical events such as the volcanic eruption of Eldfell at Heimaey island in Iceland. Cover stories included articles written by notable writers such as Robert Redford, Rick Gore, and Paul A. Zahl. Cover photos were published by notable photographers such as Emory Kristof, Winfield Parks and Joan Root.

The 1970s saw articles written and photographed at locations around the globe featuring wildlife like the October, 1978 issue titled "Conversations with a Gorilla", written by Francine Patterson with a photo on the cover of Koko the gorilla, photographed by Ronald H. Cohn. Koko grabbed the camera and took a selfie in a mirror.

Articles featured on the cover of the magazine also included human-interest stories such as "Ladakh-The Last Shangri-La", written and photographed by Thomas J. Abercrombie featuring the people of India in the March, 1978 issue. Many geographical locations were featured including the Amazon River in the October, 1972 article "The Amazon–The Mightiest of Rivers", written and photographed by Loren McIntyre.

In the November, 1971 issue, Samuel W. Mathews and photographer William R. Curtsinger spent months aboard the Research vessel Hero in Antarctica. Photos taken by Curtsinger would be the first pictures of Snow Leopards in the wild and first photos shot in Antarctica.

== 1970 ==
1970
| Title^{a} | Date | Author | Photographer | Images^{b} | Ref |
|---|---|---|---|---|---|
| Making Friends With Mountain Gorillas | January, 1970 | Dian Fossey | Robert M. Campbell | Baby gorillas with Dian Fossey | |
| East Africa's Majestic Flamingos | February, 1970 | M. Philip Kahl | M. Philip Kahl | Flamingos feeding | |
| Japan's Historic Heartland Hosts Expo '70 | March, 1970 | Thomas J. Abercrombie | Thomas J. Abercrombie | Drummer girl in Kyoto | |
| White Tiger in My House | April, 1970 | Elizabeth C. Reed | Donna K. Grosvenor | Baby white tigress | |
| Businessman in the Bush | May, 1970 | Frederick Kent Truslow | Frederick Kent Truslow | Black skimmer | |
| When in Rome.... | June, 1970 | Stuart E. Jones | Winfield Parks | Rome Colosseum | |
| The Hutterites, Plain People of the West | July, 1970 | William Albert Allard | William Albert Allard | Hutterite family | |
| Voyage to the Planets | August, 1970 | Kenneth F. Weaver | Luděk Pešek | Saturn | |
| The Cobra, India's "Good Snake" | September, 1970 | Harry Miller | Naresh and Rajesh Bedi^{c} | Cobra with flower by hand | |
| Orissa: Past and Promise in an Indian State | October, 1970 | Bart McDowell | James P. Blair | Orissa schoolboy | |
| Computer Helps Scholars Re-Create An Egyptian Temple | November, 1970 | Ray Winfield Smith | Emory Kristof | Regal profile of Nefertiti | |
| Pollution, Threat to Man's Only home | December, 1970 | Gordon Young | Bruce Dale | Western grebe in oil spill | |

== 1971 ==
1971
| Title^{a} | Date | Author | Photographer | Images^{b} | Ref |
|---|---|---|---|---|---|
| The Voyage of Ra II | January, 1971 | Thor Heyerdahl | Georges Sourial | Ra II | |
| I live with the Eskimos | February, 1971 | Guy Mary-Rousselière | Guy Mary-Rousselière | Eskimo fisherman | |
| The Lands and Peoples of Southeast Asia | March, 1971 | Peter T. White | W.E. Garrett | Akha woman in Laos | |
| The Exquisite Orchids | April, 1971 | Luis Marden | Othmar Danesch | Ophrys speculum | |
| The Condor, Soaring Spirit of the Andes | May, 1971 | Jerry McGahan | Libby McGahan | Condor vulture with Jerry McGahan | |
| Mexico to Canada on the Pacific Crest Trail | June, 1971 | Mike W. Edwards | David Hiser | Pacific Crest Trail with hikers | |
| Apollo 14: The Climb Up Cone Crater | July, 1971 | Alice J. Hall | NASA | Alan Shepard (moon) | |
| Oklahoma | August, 1971 | Robert Paul Jordan | Robert W. Madden | Oklahoma wheat worker | |
| Mzima, Kenya's Spring of Life | September, 1971 | Joan and Alan Root | Joan and Alan Root | African rock python swimming with Joan Root | |
| India's River of Faith, Ganges | October, 1971 | John J. Putnam | Raghubir Singh | Indian woman of faith | |
| Antarctica's Nearer Side | November, 1971 | Samuel W. Mathews | William R. Curtsinger | Gentoo penguin | |
| Return to Changing China | December, 1971 | Audrey Topping | Audrey Topping | Peking schoolchildren | |

== 1972 ==
1972
| Title^{a} | Date | Author | Photographer | Images^{b} | Ref |
|---|---|---|---|---|---|
| Taboos and Magic Rule Namba Lives | January, 1972 | Kal Muller | Kal Muller | New Hebrides woman | |
| African Wildlife Man's Threatened Legacy | February, 1972 | Allan C. Fisher | Thomas Nebbia | Kenyan leopard | |
| Tundra and the Splendors of It's Plants, Birds and Mammals | March, 1972 | Staff writer^{d} | John J. Burns | Lapland longspur | |
| Winter Caravan to the Roof of the World | April, 1972 | Sabrina and Roland Michaud | Roland Michaud | Kyrgyz boy | |
| Yellowstone's Hundredth Birthday | May, 1972 | William S. Ellis | Jonathan Blair | American black bear and bystanders | |
| A River Restored: Oregon's Willamette | June, 1972 | Ethel A. Starbird | Lowell J. Georgia | Canoeing on the river | |
| The Sword and Sermon | July, 1972 | Thomas J. Abercrombie | Thomas J. Abercrombie | Saudi Arabian man | |
| Stone Age Men of the Philippines | August, 1972 | Kenneth MacLeish | John Launois | Tasaday boy climbing tree | |
| Yesterday Linger Along the Connecticut | September, 1972 | Charles McCarry | David L. Arnold | Penny-farthing cyclist | |
| The Amazon-The Mightiest of Rivers | October, 1972 | Loren McIntyre | Loren McIntyre | Txukahamei girl in Brazil | |
| A Land Apart-The Monterey Peninsula | November, 1972 | Milke W. Edwards | Declan Haun | Pfeiffer Beach | |
| Those Popular Pandas | December, 1972 | Theodore H. Reed | Bruce Dale | Panda bear eating | |

== 1973 ==
1973
| Title^{a} | Date | Author | Photographer | Images^{b} | Ref |
|---|---|---|---|---|---|
| Search for the Oldest People | January, 1973 | Alexander Leaf | John Metzger | Ecuadorian man | |
| Art of the Aborigines | February, 1973 | Staff writer^{d} | Kay and Stanley Breeden | Aboriginal rock art | |
| The Last U.S. Whale Hunters | March, 1973 | Emory Kristof | Emory Kristof | Eskimo whalers canoeing | |
| Those Outlandish Goldfish | April, 1973 | Paul A. Zahl | Paul A. Zahl | Bubble Eye goldfish | |
| France's Wild Watery South | May, 1973 | William Davenport | Hans W. Silverster | Stallions in the water | |
| Australia's Great Barrier Reef | June, 1973 | Staff writer^{d} | Ron Taylor | Great Barrier Reef with Valerie Taylor | |
| Volcano Overwhelms an Icelandic Village | July, 1973 | Noel Grove | Emory Kristof | Volcano on Heimaey island | |
| Friend of the Wind: The Common Tern | August, 1973 | Ian Nisbet | Hope Alexander | Tern (bird) | |
| Change Ripple New Guinea's Sepik River | September, 1973 | Malcolm S. Kirk | Malcolm S. Kirk | New Guinea tribesman | |
| Chile: Republic on a Shoestring | October, 1973 | Gordon Young | George F. Mobley | Chilean woman with umbrella | |
| This Is My Island: Tangier | November, 1973 | Harold G. Wheatley | David Alan Harvey | Boy and a crab | |
| Lost Empire of the Incas | December, 1973 | Loren McIntyre | Loren McIntyre | Llama in a canoe | |

== 1974 ==
1974
| Title^{a} | Date | Author | Photographer | Images^{b} | Ref |
|---|---|---|---|---|---|
| Gold, The Eternal Treasure | January, 1974 | Peter T. White | James L. Stanfield | Lion in pure gold | |
| Maine's Allagash River | February, 1974 | Staff writer^{d} | Farrell Grehan | Red fox in national park | |
| Trekking the Frozen Northwest Passage | March, 1974 | Colin Irwin | Colin Irwin | Dogsled in the Arctic | |
| The England of Charles Dickens | April, 1974 | Richard A. Long | Adam Woolfitt | English boy at a window raining | |
| The Incredible Universe | May, 1974 | Kenneth F. Weaver | James P. Blair | Night sky | |
| Climbing Half Dome The Hard Way | June, 1974 | Galen Rowell | Galen Rowell | Rock climbing Half Dome | |
| Exploring England's Canals | July, 1974 | Brian Hodgson | Linda Bartlette | Oxford Canal | |
| The Phoenicians: Sealords of Antiquities | August, 1974 | Samuel W. Mathews | Winfield Parks | Phoenician amulet | |
| Europe's Shy and Spectacular Kingfisher | September, 1974 | Staff writer^{d} | Carl Johan Junge | European kingfisher | |
| Bhutan Crowns a Dragon King | October, 1974 | John Scofield | John Scofield | Jigme Singye Wangchuck in Bhutan | |
| Guatemala Maya and Modern | November, 1974 | Louis De La Haba | Joseph J. Scherschel | Children of San Juan Atitán | |
| The Isles of the Pacific | December, 1974 | Kenneth P. Emory | H. Edward Kim | smiling Polynesian woman | |

== 1975 ==
1975
| Title^{a} | Date | Author | Photographer | Images^{b} | Ref |
|---|---|---|---|---|---|
| Exploring the Mind of Ice Age Man | January, 1975 | Alexander Marshack | Alexander Marshack | Cave in Niaux, France | |
| Brazil's Beleaguered Indians | February, 1975 | W. Jesco Von Puttkamer | W. Jesco Von Puttkamer | Amazonian native Woman | |
| Hawaii, Island of Fire and Flowers | March, 1975 | Gordon Young | Robert W. Madden | Mauna Ulu volcano | |
| Diving Amid 'Sleeping' Sharks | April, 1975 | Eugenie Clark | David Doubilet | Bull shark with Eugenie Clark | |
| Life of a Baboon Troop | May, 1975 | Shirley C. Strum | Timothy W. Ransom | Baboons | |
| Andalusian, The Spirit of Spain | June, 1975 | Howard Lafay | Joseph J. Scherschel | Andalusian woman | |
| Benjamin Franklin | July, 1975 | Alice J. Hall | Linda Bartlett | Benjamin Franklin | |
| The Niger: River of Sorrow, River of Hope | August, 1975 | Georg Gerster | Georg Gerster | Nigerian woman | |
| Strange World of the Red Sea Reefs | September, 1975 | Eugenie Clark | David Doubilet | Moray eels | |
| Orangutans | October, 1975 | Birutė Galdikas-Brindamour | Rod Brindamour | Orangutans with Birutė Galdikas-Brindamour | |
| Christopher Columbus and the New World He Found | November, 1975 | John Scofield | Adam Woolfitt | Panama woman | |
| The Maya: Children of Time | December, 1975 | Howard La Fay | David Alan Harvey | Mayan statues | |

== 1976 ==
1976
| Title^{a} | Date | Author | Photographer | Images^{b} | Ref |
|---|---|---|---|---|---|
| Life or Death for the Harp Seal | January, 1976 | David M. Lavigne | William R. Curtsinger | baby Harp seal | |
| Siberia's Empire Road, The River Ob | February, 1976 | Robert Paul Jordan | Dean Conger | Siberian woman | |
| At Home with Right Whales | March, 1976 | Roger Payne | Des and Jen Bartlett^{c} | Southern right whale | |
| Irish Ways Live On In Dingle | April, 1976 | Bryan Hodgson | Linda Bartlette | Irish boy | |
| Truk Lagoon: A Sunken Japanese Fleet Becomes a Scientific Laboratory | May, 1976 | Sylvia A. Earle | Al Giddings | Truk Lagoon | |
| Kyoto and Nara: Keepers of Japan's Past | June, 1976 | Charles McCarry | George F. Mobley | Japanese woman | |
| How Are We Using the Land? | July, 1976 | Peter T. White | Jeff Foott | Bald eagle | |
| Discovered: Monarch's Mexican Haven | August, 1976 | Frederick A. Urquhart | Bianca Lavies | Monarch butterflies | |
| India Struggles to Save Her Wildlife | September, 1976 | John K. Putman | Stanley Breeden | Golden langur | |
| The Nation's River | October, 1976 | Allan C. Fisher, Jr. | James L. Stanfield | Potomac River at The Washington Monument | |
| Robert Redford Rides the Outlaw Trail | November, 1976 | Robert Redford | Jonathan Blair | American Cowboy | |
| By Square-Rigger From Baltic to Bicentennial | December, 1976 | Kenneth Garrett | Gilbert M. Grosvenor | Tall ships | |

== 1977 ==
1977
| Title^{a} | Date | Author | Photographer | Images^{b} | Ref |
|---|---|---|---|---|---|
| Sifting For Life in the Sands if Mars | , 1977 | Rick Gore | NASA | Mars surface | |
| Longest Manned Balloon Flight | February, 1977 | Ed Yost | Otis Imboden | Hot air balloon | |
| Egypt: Legacy of a Dazzling Past | March, 1977 | Alice J. Hall | Lee Boltin | Gold statue of King tut | |
| Pilgrimage to Nepal's Chrystal Mountain | April, 1977 | Joel F. Ziskin | Joel F. Ziskin | Nepali woman | |
| Wild Nursery of the Mangroves | May, 1977 | Rick Gore | Bianca Lavies | Frigatebird in a mangrove | |
| Mexico's People of Myth and Magic | June, 1977 | James Norman | Guillermo Aldana E. | Huichol art | |
| Preserving the Nation's Wild Rivers | July, 1977 | Not stated^{e} | Ed Cooper | Undine Falls in Yosemite | |
| The Air-Safety Challenge | August, 1977 | Michael E. Long | Bruce Dale | Lockheed L-1011 TriStar | |
| Following the Reindeer with Norway's Lapps | September, 1977 | Sally Anderson | Erik Borg | Norwegian Lapp teenage boy | |
| Arizona's Suburbs of the Sun | October, 1977 | David Jeffery | H. Edward Kim | Field of calendulas | |
| Brazil Tames Her Wild Frontier | November, 1977 | Loren McIntyre | Loren McIntyre | Jaguar on a tree | |
| Reach for the New World | December, 1977 | Mendel L. Peterson | Nathan Benn | Sailboat in Newfoundland | |

== 1978 ==
1978
| Title^{a} | Date | Author | Photographer | Images^{b} | Ref |
|---|---|---|---|---|---|
| Moscow: The City Around Red Square | January, 1978 | John J. Putnam | Gordon W. Gahan | Russian ballet dancers | |
| Minoans and Mycenaeans: Sea Kings of the Aegean | February, 1978 | Joseph Judge | Gordon W. Gahan | Golden death mask | |
| Ladakh-The Last Shangri-La | March, 1978 | Thomas J. Abercrombie | Thomas J. Abercrombie | Woman of Leh, India | |
| China's Incredible Find | April, 1978 | Audrey Topping | Howard Nelson | Terracotta Army | |
| Alone Across the Outback | May, 1978 | Robyn Davidson | Rick Smolan | Robyn Davidson with a camel in Australia | |
| Dragons of the Deep | June, 1978 | Paul A. Zahl | Paul A. Zahl | Leafy seadragon | |
| The Grand Canyon | July, 1978 | W. E. Garrett | W. E. Garrett | Grand Canyon | |
| New Ideas About Dinosaurs | August, 1978 | John H. Ostrom | Roy Anderson | Painting of dinosaurs | |
| Solo to the North Pole | September, 1978 | Naomi Uemura | Ira Block | Eskimo | |
| Conversations with a Gorilla | October, 1978 | Francine Patterson | Ronald H. Cohn | Koko the Gorilla with a camera | |
| Pilgrimage to Mecca | November, 1978 | Mohammed Abdul-Rauf | Mehmet Biber | Mosque at Mecca | |
| Double Eagle II Leaps the Atlantic | December, 1978 | Ben Abruzzo | Alain Dejean | Double Eagle II | |

== 1979 ==
1979
| Title^{a} | Date | Author | Photographer | Images^{b} | Ref |
|---|---|---|---|---|---|
| Sri Lanka: Time of Testing | January, 1979 | Robert Paul Jordan | Raghubir Singh | Monks praying at Buddha statue | |
| Kangaroos! That Marvelous Mob | February, 1979 | Geoffrey B. Sharman | Des and Jen Bartlett^{c} | Wallabies | |
| National Wildlife Refuges | March, 1979 | Not stated^{e} | Bates Littlehales | Tufted puffin | |
| The Trouble with Dolphins | April, 1979 | Edward J. Linehan | Al Giddings | Sylvia Earle with dolphin | |
| Americans Climb K2 | May, 1979 | James Wickwire | John Roskelley | Mountaineer on K2 | |
| American 4-H Exchange: Down on the Farm in the U.S.S.R. | June, 1979 | John Garaventa | James Tobin | Ukrainian family dancing | |
| Our National Parks | July, 1979 | Not stated^{e} | David Alan Harvey | Bridalveil Fall | |
| Walk Across America: On to the Pacific | August, 1979 | Peter and Barbara Jenkins | Skeeter Hagler | Peter and Barbara Jenkins | |
| Search for the First Americans | September, 1979 | Thomas Y. Canby | David L. Arnold | Stone tools | |
| Scenic Guilin Links China's Past and Present | October, 1979 | W.E. Garrett | W.E. Garrett | Chinese child in Guilin | |
| The Desert: An Age-Old Challenge Grows | November, 1979 | Rick Gore | Photographer | Man in a turban in Sahara Desert | |
| Our Wildest Wilderness: The Arctic Wildlife Range | December, 1979 | Douglas H. Chadwick | Stephen J. Krasemann | Caribou | |

== See also ==
- National Geographic
- National Geographic Society
- List of National Geographic cover stories

== Notes ==
a. In some issues of National Geographic, the cover story would have one title on the cover and a different title (with the same meaning) on the headline of the actual article. Titles represented in this list, are taken from the cover and the citation represents the actual article title.
b. Images could also be a painting or a drawing.
c. Although two photographers are credited, it is not stated to which one took the photo.
d. Uncredited article. Usually a breakout article.
e. Multiple articles with various authors. Photo depicted is not included in those articles.
