= List of National Geographic cover stories (2010s) =

National Geographic logo

National Geographic is an American magazine that is noted for its cover stories and accompanying photography. Throughout the 2010s National Geographic's cover stories showcased global historical events such as the American Civil War and humanities treks to Mars. Cover stories included articles written by notable writers such as Tina Rosenberg, Charles C. Mann and Robert Draper. Cover photos were published by notable photographers such as Martin Schoeller, Aaron Huey and Stephanie Sinclair.

The 2010s saw articles written and photographed at locations around the globe featuring wildlife like the January 2018 issue titled "Why Birds Matter", written by Jonathan Franzen with a photo on the cover of a Secretarybird, photographed by Joel Sartore. Articles featured on the cover of the magazine also included human-interest stories such as "Last Tribes of the Amazon", written by Scott Wallace and Chris Fagon with photography by Charlie Hamilton James featuring a child of an Amazon tribe in the October 2018 issue. Many geographical locations were featured including western South America in the April 2011 article "The Genius of the Inca", written by Heather Pringle with photographs by Dylan Cole.

== 2010 ==
2010
Title^{a}	Date	Author	Photographer	Images^{b}	Ref
Merging Man and Machine	January 2010	Josh Fischman	Mark Thiessen	Robotic hand	
Polygamy in America	February 2010	Scott Anderson	Stephanie Sinclair	Polygamist family	
Wolf Wars	March 2010	Douglas H. Chadwick	Jess Lee	Howling grey wolf	
Water: Our Thirsty World	April 2010	Barbara Kingsolver	Marc Thiessen	Water droplets	
Mount St. Helens	May 2010	Mckenzie Funk	Roger Werth	Eruption Mount St. Helens	
Greenland: Ground Zero for Global Warming	June 2010	Mark Jenkins	Photographer	Peter Essick	
400 Million Year Old Woman	July 2010	Jamie Shreeve	Tim D. White	Ardipithecus ramidus skull	
Bahamas Blue Holes	August 2010	Andrew Todhunter	Wesley C. Skiles	Cave in The Bahamas	
King Tut's DNA	September 2010	Zahi Hawass	Kenneth Garrett	King Tut's burial mask	
The Spill	October 2010	Joel K. Bourne Jr.	Joel Sartore	Oiled brown pelican	
Mysteries of Great Migrations	November 2010	David Quammen	Chris Johns	Wildebeests	
The Search for King David	December 2010	Robert Draper	Norton Simon Foundation	David Slaying Goliath	

== 2011 ==
2011
Title^{a}	Date	Author	Photographer	Images^{b}	Ref
Population 7 Billion	January 2011	Robert Kunzig	Peter Bialobrzeski	Urban landscape	
Under Paris	February 2011	Neil Shea	Fernand Ivaldi	Eiffel Tower	
Designing the Perfect Pet	March 2011	Evan Ratliff	Greg Schneider	Red fox	
The Genius of the Inca	April 2011	Heather Pringle	Dylan Cole	Inca Lost City	
Above Yosemite	May 2011	Mark Jenkins	Jimmy Chin	Half Dome	
The Birth of Religion	June 2011	Charles C. Mann	Vincent J. Musi	Göbekli Tepe	
Cleopatra	July 2011	Chip Brown	Sam Weber	Cleopatra stand-in	
The Wildest Place in North America	August 2011	Bruce Barcott	Paul Nicklen	Kermode bear	
Can We Fly	September 2011	Nancy Shute	Alain Emoult	Yves Rossy	
The New Science of the Teenage Brain	October 2011	David Dobbs	Sam Hundley	Watercolor Silhouette	
England's Medieval Mystery	November 2011	Caroline Alexander	Daniel Dociu	Medieval Warrior	
The King James Bible	December 2011	Adam Nicolson	Jim Richardson	King James Version	

== 2012 ==
2012
Title^{a}	Date	Author	Photographer	Images^{b}	Ref
Twins	January 2012	Peter Miller	Martin Schoeller	Twin children	
What Dogs Tell Us	February 2012	Evan Ratliff	William Wegman	Weimaraner	
The Journey of the Apostles	March 2012	Andrew Todhunter	Leonardo da Vinci	The Last Supper	
Titanic	April 2012	Hampton Sides	Nick Kaloterakis	Titanic	
Eyewitness to the Civil War	May 2012	Harry Katz	Rebecca Hale	American Civil War portraits	
Solar Super Storms	June 2012	Timothy Ferris	NASA	Sun	
Easter Island	July 2012	Hannah Bloch	Fernando G. Baptista	Easter Island statue	
In the Spirit of Crazy Horse	August 2012	Alexandra Fuller	Aaron Huey	Oglala Lakota Horserace	
What's Up with the Weather	September 2012	Peter Miller	Mike Hollingshead	Tornado	
Blood Ivory: 25,000 Elephants Were Killed Last Year	October 2012	Bryan Christy	Brent Stirton^{g}; Michael Nichols^{g}	Ivory tusks	
Cuba	November 2012	Cynthia Gorney	Jeremy Collins^{h}; Ken Geiger^{h}	Map of Cuba; Cheetah	
The World's Largest Trees	December 2012	David Quammen	Michael Nichols	California Redwoods	

== 2013 ==
2013
Title^{a}	Date	Author	Photographer	Images^{b}	Ref
Why We Explore^{c}; Saving Ecuador's Forest^{c}; Discovering Microbes Within Us^{c}; Up on Earth's Roof^{c}; As Low As You Can Go^{c}	January 2013	Tim Folger; Scott Wallace; Nathan Wolfe; Staff writer^{d}; Staff writer^{d}	Dana Berry; Tim Laman; Martin Oeggerli; Cory Richards; Mark Theiessen	Spacecraft; Earth; Night monkeys; Microorganism; Ice climber; Deepsea Challenger	
Unseen Libya	February 2013	Robert Draper	George Steinmetz	Temple of Zeus, Olympia	
America Strikes Oil	March 2013	David Quammen	Eugene Richards	Oil rig fire	
Reviving Extinct Species	April 2013	Carl Zimmer	Jon Foster	Woolly mammoth	
This Baby Will Live to Be 120*	May 2013	Stephen S. Hall	Robert Clark	Infant	
The New Explorers	June 2013	Peter Gwin	Marco Grob	James Cameron	
Our Wild Wild Solar System	July 2013	Robert Irion	Dana Berry	Planets colliding	
Sugar: Why We Can't Resist It	August 2013	David Quammen	Robert Clark	Cupcake	
Rising Seas	September 2013	Tim Folger	Nick Kaloterakis	Statue of Liberty	
The Photography Issue	October 2013	Robert Draper	Steve McCurry, et al.^{e}	Sharbat Gula. et al.^{f}	
The Monster Storm	November 2013	Robert Draper	Carsten Peter	Tim Samaras; Tornado	
Our Greatest Journey	December 2013	Paul Salopek	John Stanmeyer	Paul Salopek; Camels	

== 2014 ==
2014
Title^{a}	Date	Author	Photographer	Images^{b}	Ref
Defenders of the Amazon	January 2014	Chip Brown	Martin Schoeller	Kayapo girl	
The New Science of the Brain	February 2014	Carl Zimmer	Van Wedeen; L.L. Wald	Fibers inside the brain	
The Truth About Black Holes	March 2014	Michael Finkel	Mark A. Garlick	Black hole	
Wild Pets	April 2014	Lauren Slater	Vincent J. Musi	Hedgehog	
The New Food Revolution	May 2014	Johnathan Foley	Nick Kaloterais	Earth	
Hero Dogs	June 2014	Michael Paterniti	Martin Schoeller	Belgian Malinois	
Is Anybody Out There?	July 2014	Michael Lemonick	Dana Berry	Europa (moon)	
The First Stonehenge	August 2014	Roff Smith	Jim Richardson	Stones of Stenness	
Rome's Bad Boy	September 2014	Robert Draper	Sam Weber	Nero	
Move Over T.Rex!	October 2014	Tom Mueller	Mike Hettwer	Spinosaurus	
Real Zombies	November 2014	Carl Zimmer	Anand Varma	Ladybug; Wasp	
The Joy of Food	December 2014	Staff writer^{k}	Joel Sartore	Red apple	

== 2015 ==
2015
Title^{a}	Date	Author	Photographer	Images^{b}	Ref
The First American	January 2015	Glen Hodges	Tomer Hanuka	12,000 year old teenager	
Healing Our Soldiers	February 2015	Caroline Alexander	Lynn Johnson	USMC soldier	
The War on Science	March 2015	Joel Achenbach	Richard Barnes	Fake photo set of Moon landing	
Lincoln	April 2015	Adam Goodheart	Library of Congress	Abraham Lincoln	
Thinking Like a Dolphin	May 2015	Joshua Foer	Brian Skerry	Bottlenose dolphin	
Weed: The New Science of Marijuana	June 2015	Hampton Sides	Bill Marr	Marijuana plant	
Destination Pluto	July 2015	Nadia Drake	Dana Berry	Pluto	
Pope Francis	August 2015	Robert Draper	Dave Yoder	Pope Francis	
Ivory	September 2015	Bryan Christy	Rebecca Hale	Ivory tusk	
Almost Human	October 2015	Jamie Shreeve	Robert Clark	Homo naledi	
Cool it.	November 2015	Peter Miller	Robert Simmon	Earth	
Mary	December 2015	Maureen Orth	Diana Markosian	Madonna (art)	

== 2016 ==
2016
Title^{a}	Date	Author	Photographer	Images^{b}	Ref
The Power of Parks	January 2016	David Quammen	Stephen Wilkes	Yosemite	
Under London	February 2016	Roff Smith	Imagery Forces	London artifacts	
Eat Me	March 2016	Elizabeth Royte	Hans Gissinger	Vegetables	
The Photo Ark	April 2016	Rachel Hartigan Shea	Joel Sartore	Giant panda	
Yellowstone	May 2016	David Quammen	Jordan Metcalfe	Yellowstone	
Tomb Raiders	June 2016	Tom Mueller	Kenneth Garrett	King Tut mask	
The Real CSI	July 2016	Veronique Greenwood	ar-chi (Getty Images)	Thumbprint	
The DNA Revolution	August 2016	Michael Specter	Bose Collins	DNA strand	
The End of Blindness	September 2016	David Dobbs	David Littsschwager	Human eye	
Back to Nature	October 2016	Timothy Egan	Corey Arnold	Photo	
Race to the Red Planet	November 2016	Joel Achenbach	ISRO	Mars	
The Healing Power of Faith	December 2016	Erik Vance	Leemage/Corbis	St. Catherine of Siena by Il Sodoma	

== 2017 ==
2017
Title^{a}	Date	Author	Photographer	Images^{b}	Ref
Gender Revolution	January 2017	Tina Rosenberg	Robin Hammond	Transgender girl	
Saving Our Oceans	February 2017	Cynthia Barnett	Brian Skerry	California sea lion	
Vikings	March 2017	Heather Pringle	Fernando G.Baptista	Viking	
The Next Human	April 2017	T.D. Max	Owen Freeman	Past, present, future Humans	
What is Genius	May 2017	Claudia Clab	Tomer Hanuka	Albert Einstein	
Why We Lie	June 2017	Yudhijit Bhattacharjee	Staff Photographer^{i}	Polygraph readout	
Secret Antarctica	July 2017	Laurent Ballesta	Laurent Ballesta	Scuba diver under ice	
The Space Issue	August 2017	Multiple authors^{j}	NASA	Crab Nebula	
The Science of Addiction	September 2017	Fran Smith	Max Aguilera-Hellweg	Human brain	
The Making of an Icon: Becoming Jane	October 2017	Tony Gerber	Hugo van Lawick	Jane Goodall	
The Search for Happiness	November 2017	Dan Buettner	James Kaiser	Waterfall in Costa Rica	
The Real Jesus	December 2017	Kristin Romey	Bridgeman Images	Head of Christ (Rembrandt)	

== 2018 ==
2018
Title^{a}	Date	Author	Photographer	Images^{b}	Ref
Why Birds Matter	January 2018	Jonathan Franzen	Joel Sartore	Secretarybird	
The New Big Brother	February 2018	Robert Draper	Nick Kaloterakis	Satellite	
Through An Astronaut's Eyes	March 2018	Nadia Drake	Dan Winters	Peggy Whitson	
Black and White	April 2018	Patricia Edmonds	Robin Hammond	Twins	
Artist, Provocateur, Rouge, Genius, Picasso.	May 2018	Leila Fadel	Pablo Picasso	Picasso Self-portrait	
Planet or Plastic?	June 2018	Laura Parker	Jorge Gamboa	Iceberg	
Building a Better Athlete	July 2018	Christine Brennan	John Huet	Katie Ledecky	
The Science of Sleep	August 2018	Michael Finkel	Magnus Wennman	Child sleeping	
The Story of a Face	September 2018	Joanna Connors	Maggie Steber	Face transplant recipient	
Last Tribes of the Amazon	October 2018	Scott Wallace; Chris Fagon	Charlie Hamilton James	Child of an Amazon tribe	
Battle for the American West	November 2018	Hannah Nordhaus	Aaron Huey	Cowboy on horseback	
The Search for Sacred Text	December 2018	Robert Draper	Paolo Veronese	Torah scroll	

== 2019 ==
2019
Title^{a}	Date	Author	Photographer	Images^{b}	Ref
The Future of Medicine	January 2019	Fran Smith	Craig Cutler	Hand with Microchip	
The Ultimate Climb	February 2019	Mark Synnott	Mickey Schaefer	Alex Honnold climbing El Capitan	
Are We Alone	March 2019	Jamie Shreeve	Sarel Van Staden; Maryna Cotton	MeerKAT viewing Milky Way	
Cities	April 2019	Neil Shea	Vincent Laforet	Sydney Harbour Bridge	
Leonardo	May 2019	Claudia Kalb	Riccardo Vecchio	Leonardo da Vinci	
The Hidden Cost of Wildlife Tourism	June 2019	Natasha Daly	Kristen Luce	Caged sloth	
Beyond the Moon: A New Era of Space Travel is Here	July 2019	Multiple authors^{j}	William Anders	Earthrise	
World on the Move	August 2019	Paul Salopek	K M Asad	Rohingya Refugee	
The Arctic is Heating Up	September 2019	Shea	NSIDC	Earth	
Last of Its Kind	October 2019	Elizabeth Kolbert	Ami Vitale	Sudan (rhinoceros)	
Women: A Century of Change	November 2019	Multiple authors^{j}	Multiple^{j}	Photo	
Under Jerusalem	December 2019	Andrew Lawler	Bose Collins	Jerusalem	

== See also ==
- National Geographic
- National Geographic Society
- List of National Geographic cover stories

== Notes ==
a. In some issues of National Geographic, the cover story would have one title on the cover and a different title (with the same meaning) on the headline of the actual article, or the title may appear different on the table of contents. Titles represented in this list, are taken from the cover and the citation represents the title listed in the table of contents.
b. Images could also be a painting, drawing or computer rendering.
c. There were five versions of this issue of the magazine, each from a different author and photographer.
d. Pictorial: No author associated with photos.
e. Multiple uncredited photographers. Photomontage of multiple past cover images
f. One large picture alongside a photomontage of multiple past cover images
g. Two photos on the cover from two different photographers
h. Although two photographers are credited, it is not stated to which one took the photo.
i. Uncredited photograph or illustration
j. Multiple articles associated with the cover. Cover photo not depicted in those articles.
k. Uncredited author. Usually a breakout article.
