= List of National Geographic cover stories =

National Geographic logo

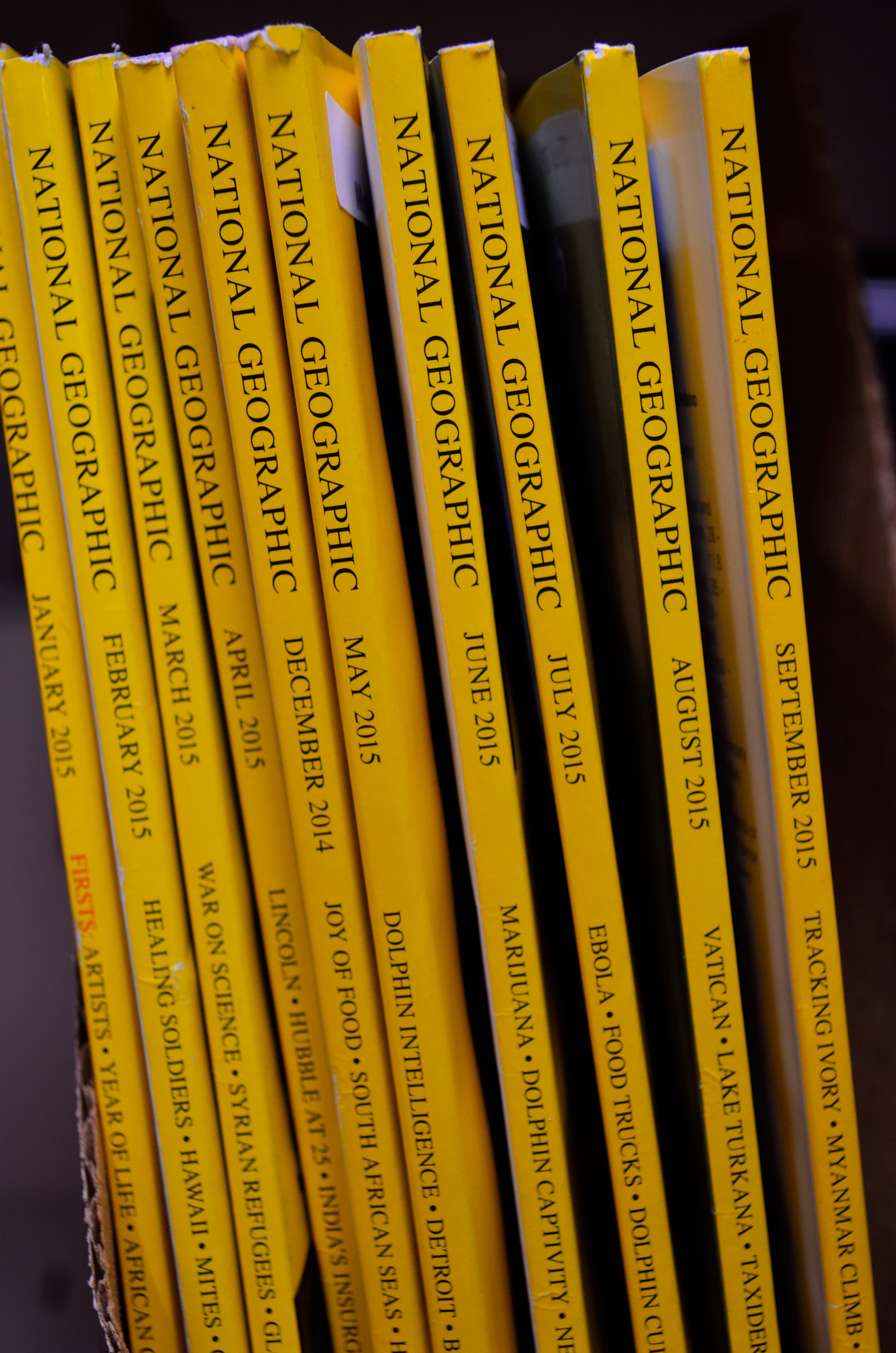
National Geographic magazines from 2015

National Geographic is an American magazine noted for its cover stories and accompanying photography. This is a list of National Geographic cover stories including writers and photographers starting in July 1959, when the magazine started featuring photos on the front cover.

National Geographic was first published in October of 1888 with the first photo to appear on the cover in July 1959, that of an American flag. Articles include stories about geography, history, nature and science.

== Notable cover stories ==
In the December 1969 issue, astronauts Neil Armstrong, Buzz Aldrin and Michael Collins wrote the cover story titled "First Explorers on the Moon", writing in detail their account of the Apollo 11 mission and what it was like being the first humans on the Moon. The cover of the magazine featured a picture taken from space by Armstrong of Aldrin in a spacesuit on the surface of the Moon.

In the November 1971 issue, Samuel W. Mathews and photographer William R. Curtsinger spent months aboard the research vessel Hero in Antarctica. Photos taken by Curtsinger would be the first pictures of snow leopards in the wild and the first photos shot in Antarctica for the magazine.

In the June 1985 issue, Debra Denker's cover story "Along Afghanistan's War-torn Frontier" about the Soviet and Afghanistan war featured a cover photo depicting a green-eyed Afghanistan girl (Sharbat Gula), photographed by Steve McCurry. This cover image is National Geographic's most recognized photo.

In the August 1991 issue, Thomas Y. Canby wrote the cover story titled "The Persian Gulf: After the Storm", about the Kuwaiti oil fires after the Persian Gulf War. The photo on the magazine's cover featured oil fields on fire, photographed by Steve McCurry.

In the April 2007 issue, Fen Montaigne's cover story "Saving the Sea Bounty", about the dangers facing marine life, featured a cover image of a swordfish caught in a net photographed by Brian Skerry.

In the November 2016 issue, Joel Achenbach wrote the cover story titled "The Race to the Red Planet", about humanity's treks to Mars. The cover featured a photo of Mars captured by the Indian Space Research Organization (ISRO) Mars Orbiter Mission spacecraft.

== Contents ==
Year
1950s:										1959
1960s:	1960	1961	1962	1963	1964	1965	1966	1967	1968	1969
1970s:	1970	1971	1972	1973	1974	1975	1976	1977	1978	1979
1980s:	1980	1981	1982	1983	1984	1985	1986	1987	1988	1989
1990s:	1990	1991	1992	1993	1994	1995	1996	1997	1998	1999
2000s:	2000	2001	2002	2003	2004	2005	2006	2007	2008	2009
2010s:	2010	2011	2012	2013	2014	2015	2016	2017	2018	2019
2020s:	2020	2021	2022	2023	2024

== See also ==
- National Geographic
- National Geographic Society
