= Rousselière =

Rousselière is a surname. Notable people with the surname include:

- Charles Rousselière (1875–1950), French operatic tenor
- Guy Mary-Rousselière (1913–1994), French-Canadian anthropologist and missionary priest
