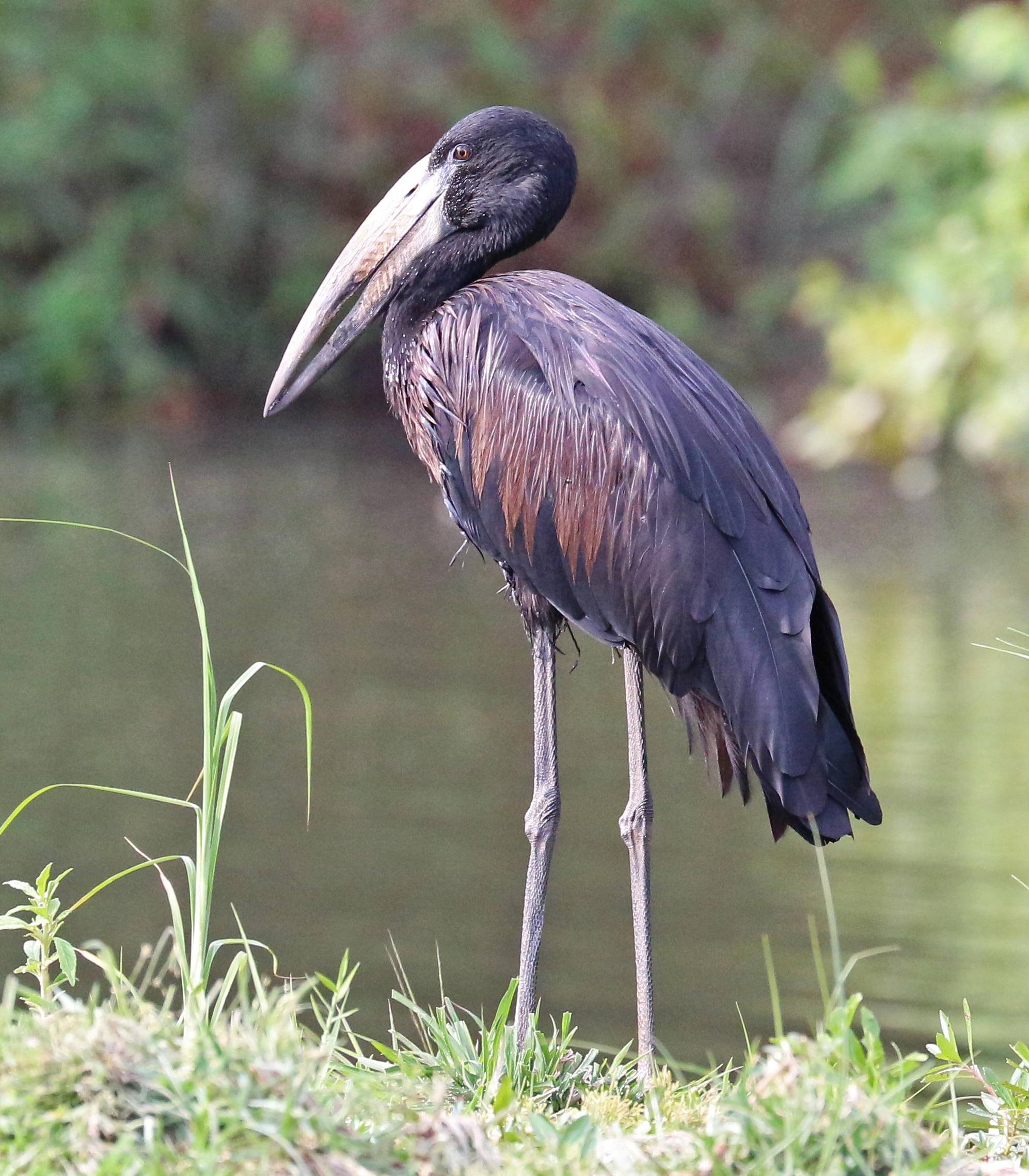
- On the bank of the Zambezi, Zimbabwe

Conservation status
- Least Concern (IUCN 3.1)

Scientific classification
- Kingdom: Animalia
- Phylum: Chordata
- Class: Aves
- Order: Ciconiiformes
- Family: Ciconiidae
- Genus: Anastomus
- Species: A. lamelligerus

Binomial name
- Anastomus lamelligerus Temminck, 1823

= African openbill =

Species of stork

The African openbill (Anastomus lamelligerus) is a species of stork from the family Ciconiidae. It is widely distributed in Sub-Saharan Africa and western regions of Madagascar. This species is considered common to locally abundant across its range, although it has a patchy distribution. Some experts consider there to be two sub-species, A. l. lamelligerus distributed on the continent and A. l. madagascariensis living on the island of Madagascar. Scientists distinguish between the two sub-species due to the more pronounced longitudinal ridges on the bills of adult A. l. madagascariensis. The Asian openbill (Anastomus oscitans) found in Asia is the African openbill's closest relative. The two species share the same notably large bill of a peculiar shape that gives them their name.

== Description ==
The African openbill is a stork measuring 80–94 cm (31–37 in) and weighing 1–1.3 kg (2.2–2.9 lb). The species does not exhibit any major sexual dimorphism, although the males are slightly larger than the females and have a longer and heavier bill. The adult bill is between 135–196 mm (5.3–7.7 in) in length, brownish in color and has a gap between the upper and lower mandible. This gap is non-existent in juvenile birds and develops as the bird ages. It is because the two mandibles of the beak only meet at the tip and not in the middle that this stork genus received the name of "openbill".

The adult plumage is overall black with iridescent green feathers on their backs, coverts and abdomens. The juvenile plumage is usually less vibrant and browner in color with the feathers of the underparts having pale tips. The legs and feet are black. The eyes are grey with grey lores and no distinct coloration of the eye-ring.

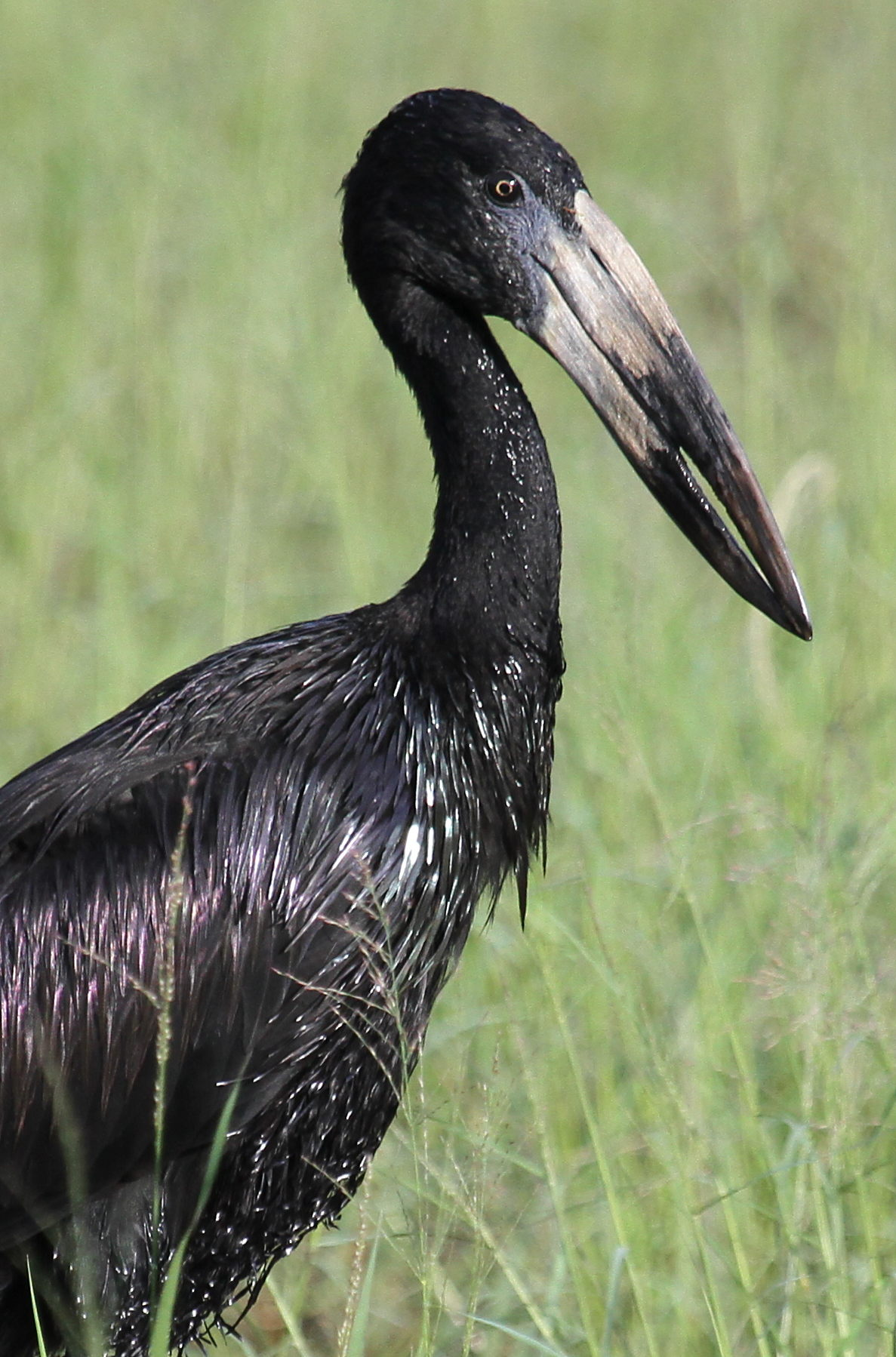
Close up of head

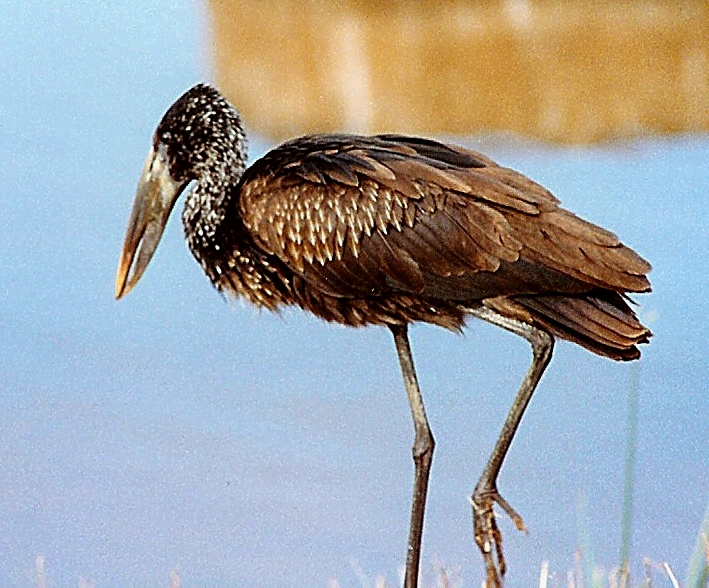
Juvenile African openbill

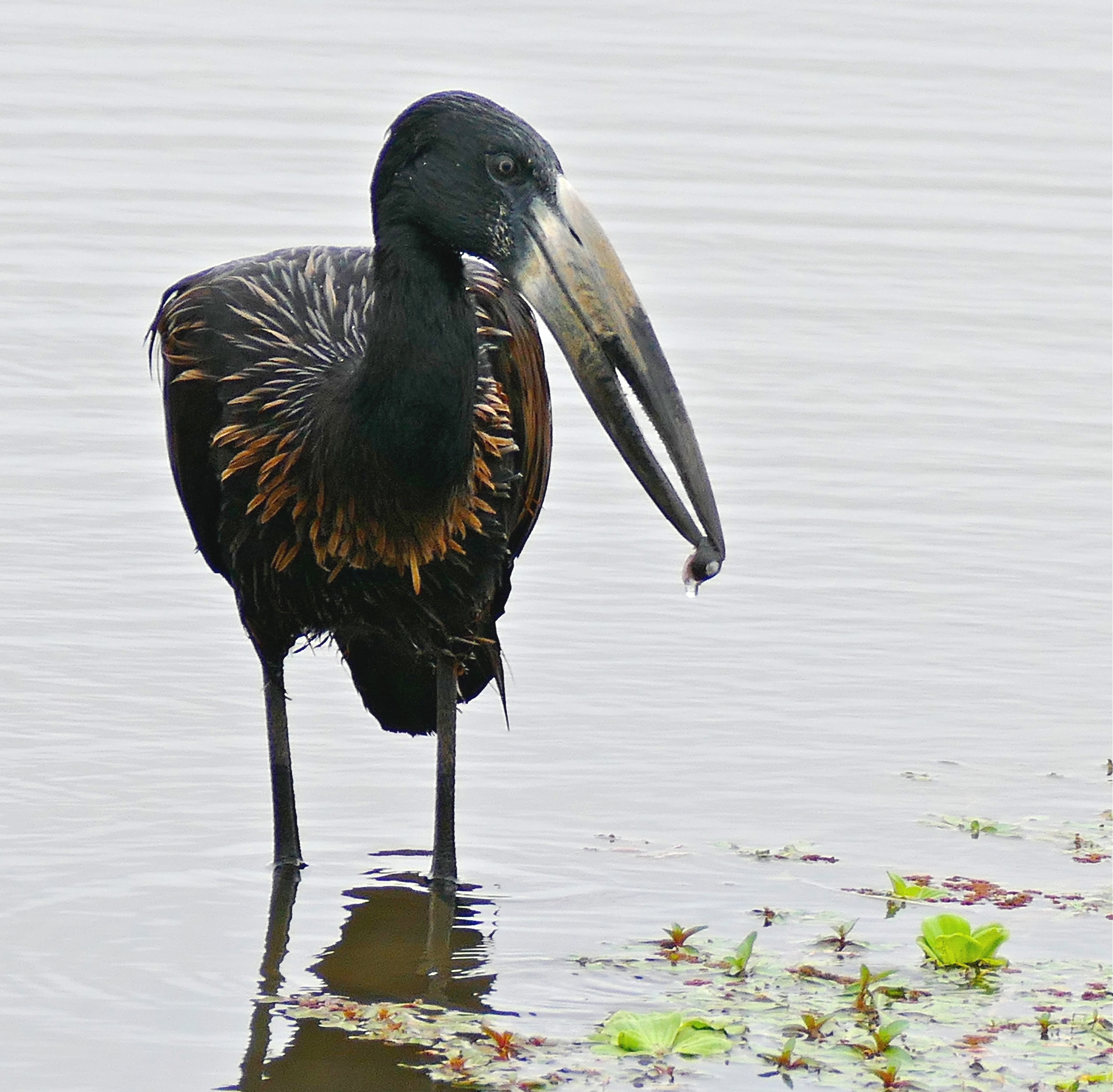
African openbill holding a snail with the tip of its bill

=== Bill shape ===
The gap in the bill of the African openbill was first hypothesized to serve as a nutcracker, crushing the shells of the snails this stork feeds on. Scientists later demonstrated that the bill does not serve this function. Rather the opening between the two mandibles facilitates grasping the shells of the snails. The convergent tips of the mandibles prevent the slipping forward of a spherical object being carried by the storks. The curve in the lower mandible allows the stork to have the perfect angle of attack to force its way under the operculum and release the molluscs from their shells. The bill of the African openbill storks closely evolved with the bird's specialized diet, allowing for the perfect handling of snails and other molluscs.

=== Sounds ===
Many of the social displays of the African openbill stork are accompanied by bill clatters as is common in most of the Ciconiidae species. This bird also croaks and honks loudly.

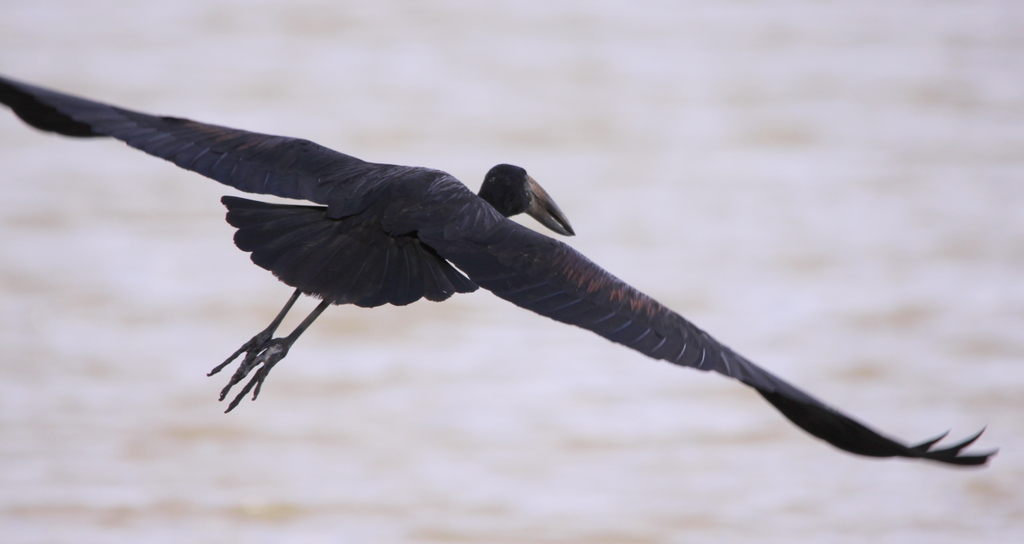
African openbill in flight

=== Flight ===
These storks are smaller in stature than most of the other species in their family, which allows them to be much more agile in the air. This agility can be observed during their descents from high altitudes as they often perform steep dives and remarkable acrobatic manoeuvres. During their migration flights, the African openbill storks will use sustained flapping flight with an average wing flap rate of 200–210 flaps/minute. They will also often soar on the thermals when commuting to and from distant feeding areas. This allows them to travel long distances to obtain food without expending too much energy. In flight, these birds have their necks and head extended and their long, broad wings are spread out and perfect for soaring and gliding on the air currents.

=== Predators ===
The adult African openbill does not have many predators, although the species is preyed upon by the tawny eagle (Aquila rapax). The eggs of the African openbill are preyed on by the African harrier-hawk (Polyboroides typus), the African marsh-harrier (Circus ranivorus) and monitor lizards (genus Varanus).

=== Special feathers ===
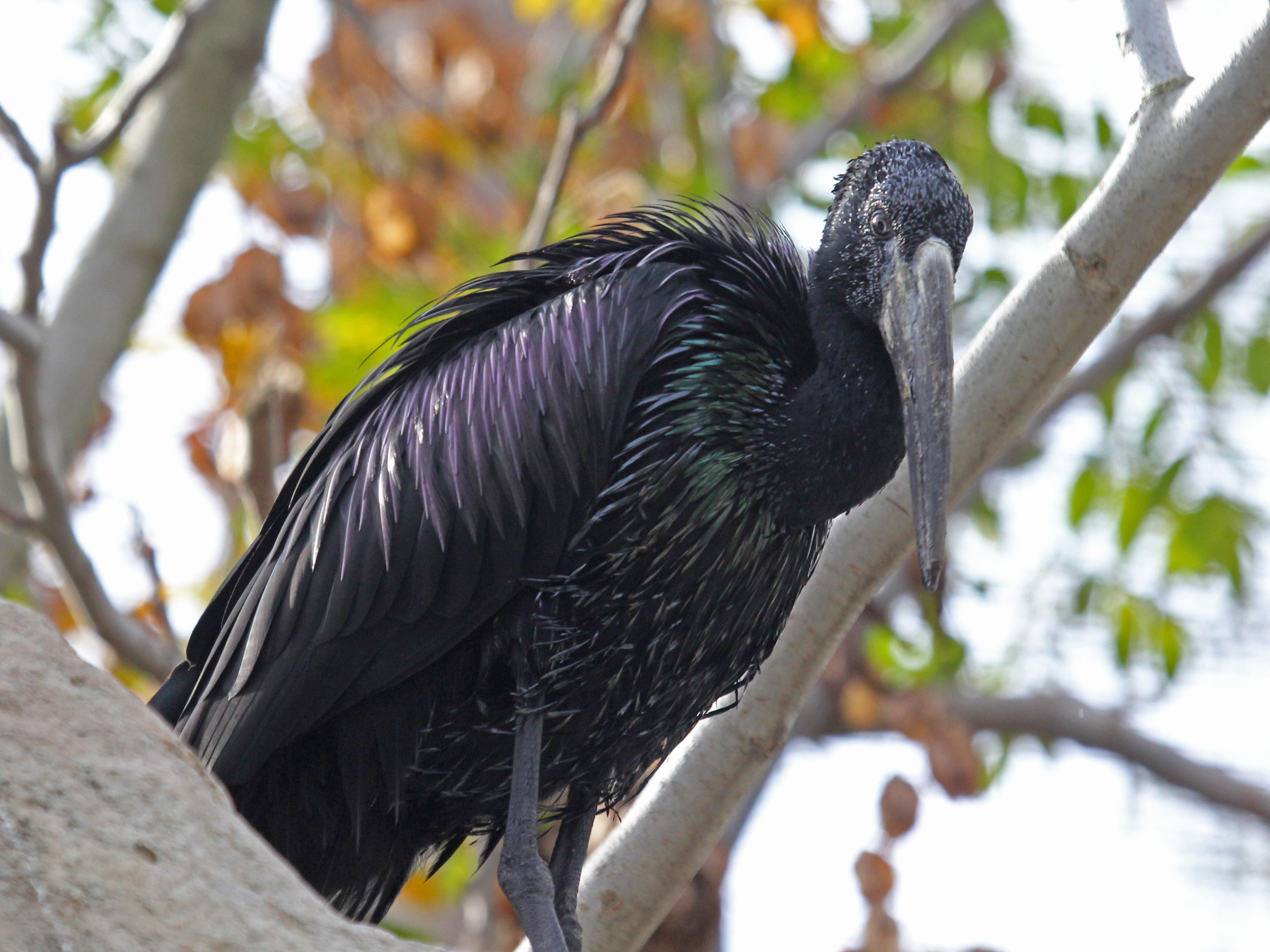
Iridescent feathers of the African openbill

Adult African openbills have dark shiny feathers on their wings and chest that serve in parade and other types of signaling between individuals of the species. These special feathers do not follow the typical structure of feathers. Usually, feathers have a rachis, barbs and barbules, but none of that is found in these parade feathers. Instead, the feathers have a single ribbon-shaped body and a few long, fine stems that disperse laterally from the flat part of the ribbon. This structure serves to create the iridescent colors observed on the feathers. The bottom part of the feathers presents the normal structure of feathers and serves for insulation purposes. It does not produce any color.

The coloration is perceived on the outside of the ribbon structure and therefore the iridescence is produced by the external portion of the cortex. This cortex consists of melanin nodules repeated periodically along planes inside the ribbon. These planes are parallel to each other. Scientists believe the dark green appearance of these feathers to be due to the low reflectance levels of the melanin nodules.

Two color-producing processes have been proposed to explain why these feathers have a green coloration:

1. The nodules act collectively to produce constructive interference for yellow and blue radiation. These mix in the eye to produce the impression of green.
2. The nodules act individually. The light passing through each nodule is dissipated by the melanin pigment. This attenuates the green and red portions of the visible light spectrum. The blue and yellow reflect with the light. The two hues then mix in the eye to produce green.

=== Conservation concern ===
The African openbill stork is considered out of danger worldwide as it is abundant in various portions of its range. There are no current estimate for the total population numbers, but they appear to be quite stable. Although they are not currently threatened, they remain a large bird with low reproductive success meaning that human activities affecting their habitat could have a big impact on the species.

== Diet ==
These birds primarily feed on aquatic snails of the genus Pila. They have been observed to also eat freshwater mussels. In different parts of their range, some individuals have been observed to eat terrestrial snails, frogs, crabs, fish, worms and large insects. None of these are the preferred food choice of the African openbill.

=== Foraging ===
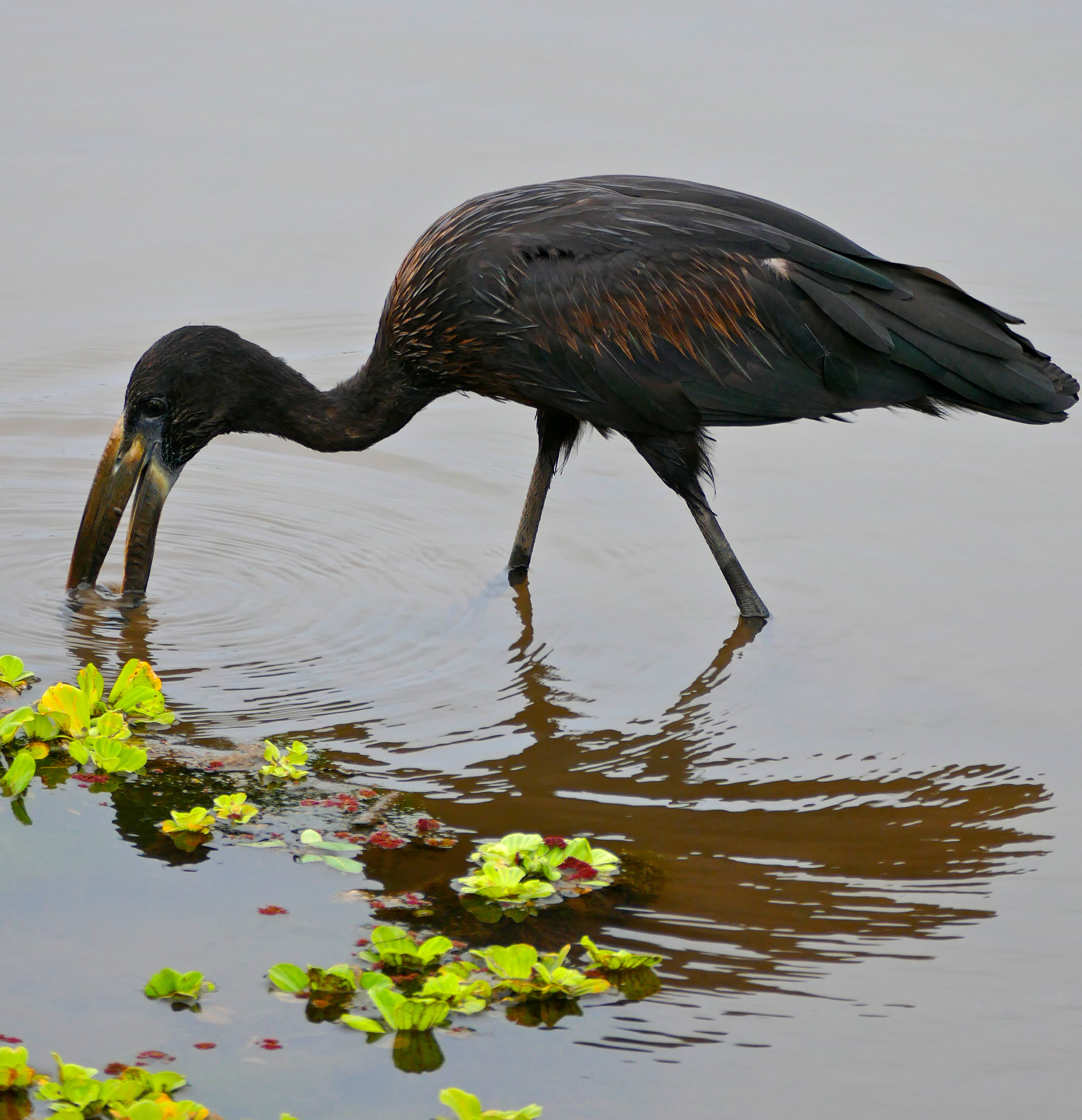
An adult African openbill foraging for snails in the water

To forage for snails, the African openbill stands in shallow water, repeatedly dipping its beak in. They hold their bill slightly ajar and will snap it shut if they encounter a prey. Once they have a hold on the prey, they hold it with the tip of their mandibles and carry it back to shore. The storks will start slowly walking around and changing location, if they do not capture anything in the area they decided to forage in.

The African openbill sometimes forages by standing on the back of hippopotamuses (Hippopotamus amphibius). As the hippopotamus wades through the vegetation, it upturns it and exposes the multiple snails that cling to the undersides of the plants. The stork will then feed on these exposed snails that have become easy prey. The hippopotamus does not seem to mind the presences of the bird on its back and is not harmed by it in any way.

Lastly, very few individuals have been observed to forage visually from afar. There are accounts of African openbill storks swooping down from their nest and immediately securing a prey. This behavior is extremely uncommon for the stork but does occur.

=== Feeding behavior ===
==== Nestling feeding behavior ====
The nestlings of the African openbill stork never voluntarily eat anything else than molluscs. Even when extremely hungry, the nestlings will not ingest other types of meat unless being force-fed. The nestlings have been observed as unaware of how to consume fish. When presented with them, the young African openbill would try to swallow them sideways or backwards as it is not instinctive to them how to consume those food items. The young feed in the nest through regurgitation from the parents. When eating, the nestlings bring their wings over their head in an attempt to protect their food from being stolen by competing nest mates. In nestlings, the sides of the lower mandible are flexible, and the gular skin is loose and elastic which allows them to swallow large pieces of food relative to their size. The esophagus is expandible and permits storage of food. The nestlings can ingest large quantities of food when available which allows them to survive relatively long periods of time with no food intake.

==== Adult feeding behavior ====
The adults either feed alone or in large groups. If a colony has found a successful foraging area, they often return to it and piles of snail shells can be seen accumulating on the shores. During nesting season, the African openbill adults will bring the food items back to their nest and these large piles of shells can be seen accumulating under the colony's tree.

=== Opening of mollusks ===
Once the storks capture a mollusc, they carry their prey to shore for extraction and consumption of the meat. The African openbill are well known for removing the meat of the molluscs without breaking their fragile shells.

==== Snails ====
Most of this procedure is done underwater or hidden in vegetation, therefore there are still a lot of unknowns surrounding how exactly the African openbill removes the meat from the snail shells. Scientists know that the storks often submerge their head in the water while working on the shells and that they vigorously shake their heads up and down while doing so. This vigorous motion of the head led many scientists to incorrectly conclude the storks were crushing shells. Freshly discarded shells have been collected in multiple studies and have always been found whole, therefore discrediting the hypothesis of the storks breaking the shells to obtain the mollusc meat.

The African openbill storks are believed to remove the snails from their shells by using their bills to pin the snails down long enough for the bird to sever the operculum. This is achieved by using the tip of the upper mandible to hold the snail on the ground and forcing the tip of the lower mandible under the operculum. Once the attachment point has been broken, the stork uses the tip of its bill to grasp onto the snail's body and shakes its head sideways to release the meat from the shell. Finally, the stork swallows the body whole by tossing its head backwards.

==== Mussels ====
Opening mussels poses a bigger problem to the storks. Since the African openbill can't open the mussel by itself, it will usually gather them up in large piles on the shore and wait for the sun to kill them. Once dead, the mussels release their hold on the shells leaving the meat accessible to the birds.

== Habitat ==
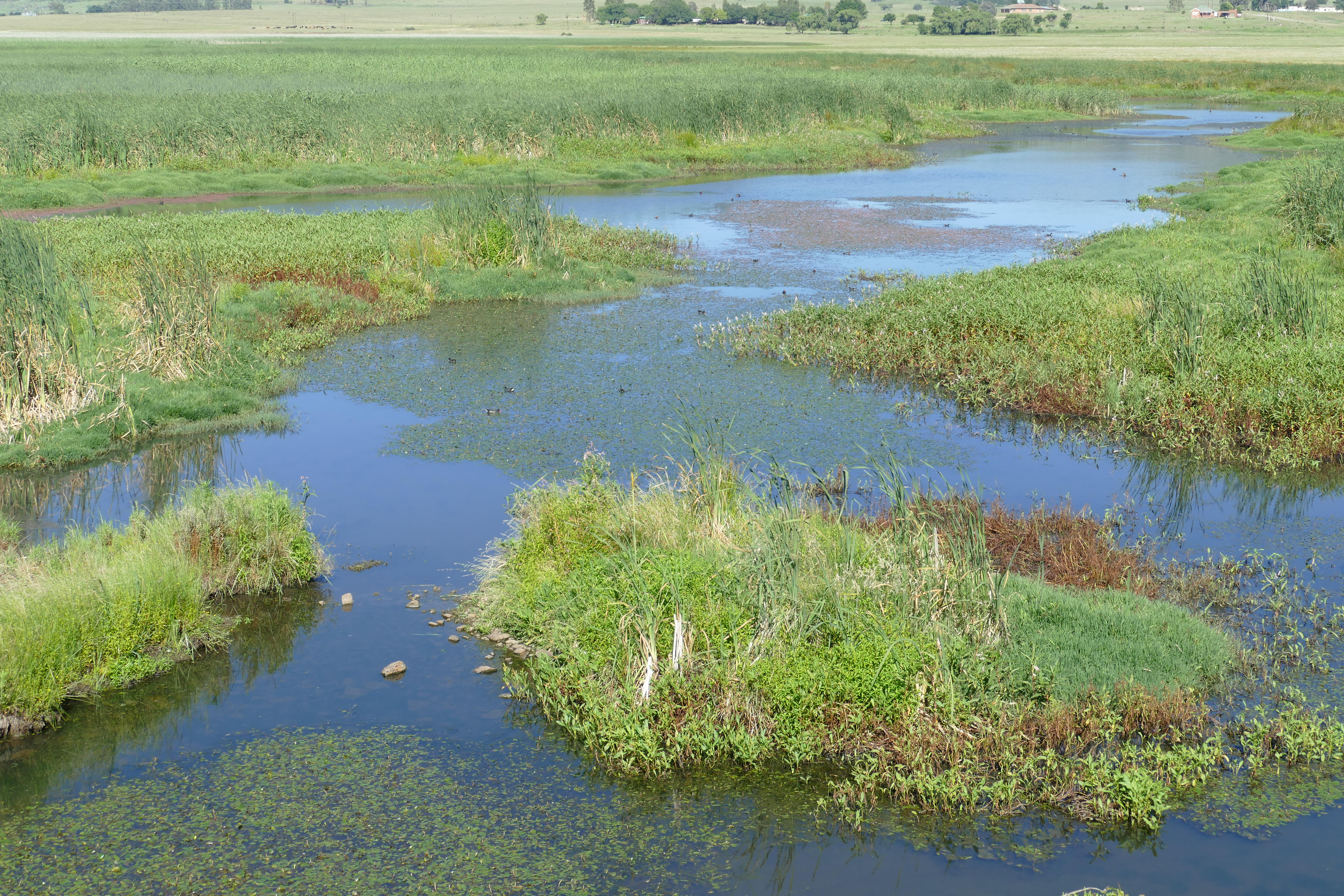
Freshwater wetland

African openbill storks live in every habitat where suitable mollusc prey can be found. Their preferred habitats remain long stretches of freshwater. They can sometimes be seen far from humid habitats, but only exceptionally. The place you are most likely to see them are on large freshwater wetlands with nearby tall trees or shrubs for them to nest in.

=== Migration ===
Some African openbill population are trans-equatorial migrants. Timing their migration to arrive in West Africa for the start of the dry period. They migrate in flocks and most of the reason and organisation behind these movements remain unknown. Some populations migrate while others are residents, migration in African openbill highly depends on the weather conditions.

== Behavior ==
=== Adult specific behavior ===
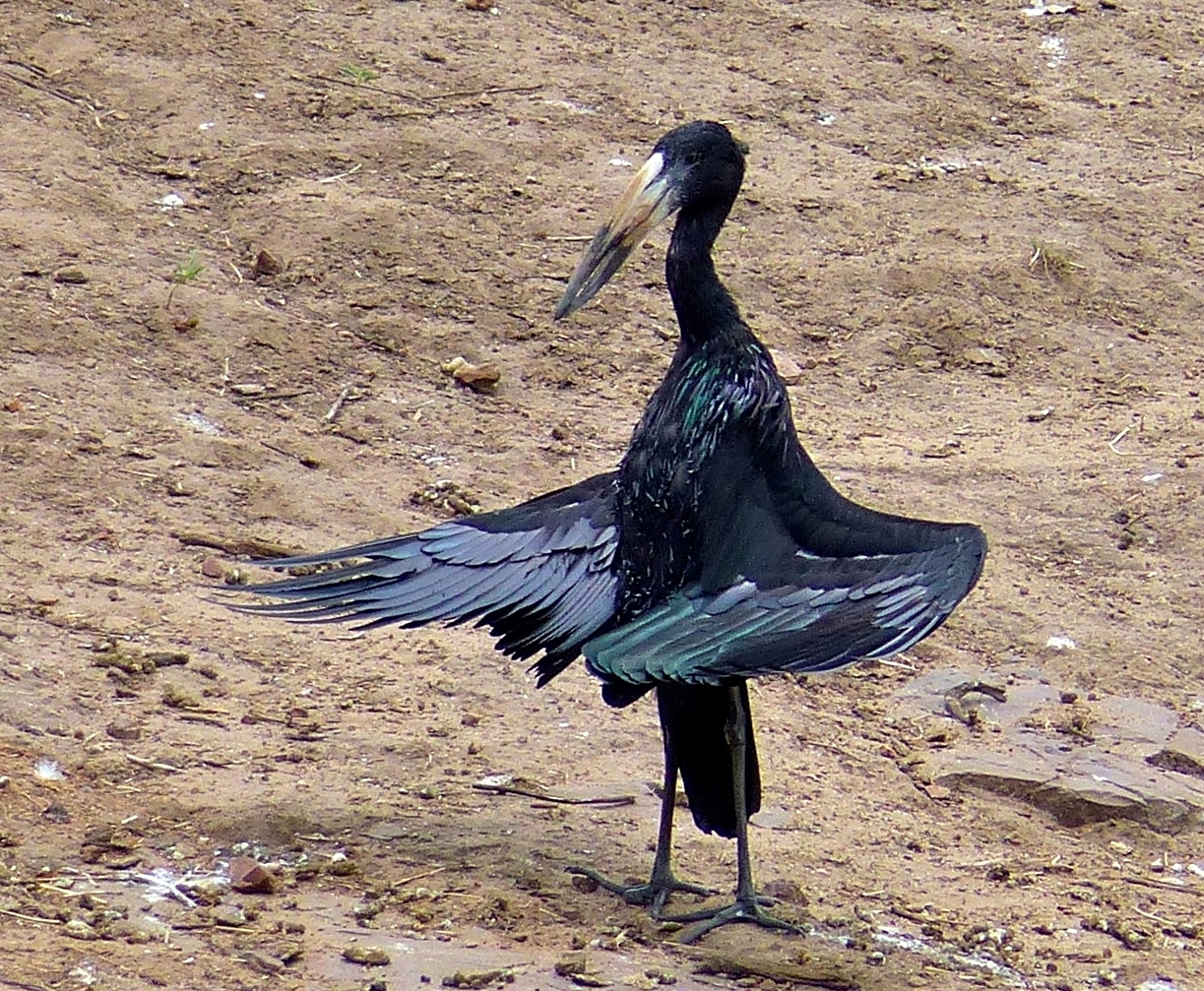
African openbill in a spread wing sunning posture

==== Comfort movements ====
The African openbill uses the same comfort movements as seen in other storks such as preening, scratching and stretching. In addition, they rub the crown of their heads on the feathers of their backs in a circular, rolling motion. Other comfort movements include adopting the spread wing posture while sunning. While in the spread wing posture, the African openbill stork will sometimes excrete on its. This is known as "urohidrosis" and serves for thermoregulatory purposes.

==== Social displays while foraging ====
Few social interactions are observed when the storks are foraging. Flocks are even often seen foraging together. Sometimes hostile confrontations can occur between birds. In those situations, the dominant bird gives the Forward Threat display which lasts for a few seconds. The subordinate bird will respond to that display by adopting the Upright Display. If this doesn't terminate the threat from the dominant bird, the subordinate will stop its display and fly away.

Description of the displays observed between adult African Openbill storks while foraging
Forward Threat	The neck is partially retracted, and the body is held almost horizontal The bird erects the feathers on its neck, breast and upper back, as well as the ones on its crown which gives the appearance of a square head. The tail is usually slightly cocked, and the tip of the wings are lifted. The bird finally orients its bill at its opponent and advances. The bird will occasionally hold it bill slightly ajar and shake its head as it approaches the subordinate bird.
Upright Display	The bird stands erect, having its neck extended upwards and its plumage compacted. As the dominant bird is approaching, the subordinate will turn away and take evasive steps moving either sideways or backwards.

==== Social displays at the nest ====
===== Primarily hostile =====
Name of the display	Nature of the display	Execution
Forward clattering threat	This display usually takes place between a bird on a nest and another on nearby branches. It is sometimes performed by pairs where the males will threaten each other, and the females will do the same. The birds alternate their bill grabs in order to land damaging blows only rarely on the other bird.	The birds erect the feathers on their necks and heads and then quickly extend their necks to grab at their opponent with their bills. After grabbing, the bill is often snapped loudly. The wings are held open and sometimes flapped to help stay balanced and the bird's tail is cocked.
Snap display	This display is quite a subtle movement. It is most commonly used in the beginning of the breeding period as the pairs get used to each other's presence. Both sexes perform this display in succession as a greeting when one of the birds' lands at the nest after a period of absence. As the breeding season progresses, this display is observed less.	The bird stand in a normal posture in its nest, quickly lifts its bill slightly above the horizontal and snaps it audibly once.
Anxiety stretch	Birds use this display as a response to disturbing objects approaching the nest. This display most likely serves as a warning to the other members of the colony that a danger might be approaching.	The bird stand erect with its bill closed and plumage compacted. The bird then leans forward while arching its neck and peering intently at the disturbing object. Sometimes the bird will also per 90° away from the disturbance.

===== Primarily sexual =====
Name of the display	Nature of the display	Execution
Up-down	This is a common greeting display simultaneously given by both members of a pair, after one returns to the nest. Each cycle of greeting lasts between 5 and 7 seconds.	The bird stands erect and extends its neck up while arching it forward. The bill is pointed slightly upwards and gaped open, the wingtips are slightly lifted, and the tail is cocked. The birds then move their head and neck slowly downwards until their bill almost touches the ground. A series of vocalizations with a high-pitch rasping quality are given through this downwards movement at 1-2 second intervals. Sometime the birds will also perform a loose shake of the head, before, during or after the greeting.
Swaying twig-grasping	This display is most often performed by the males, although sometimes females might perform it as well. Sometimes both mates will perform this display together after completing the Up-Down display	The bird bends forward and lightly grasps nest-sticks. The bird then oscillates left to right, grabbing sticks at the end of each oscillation. When performed by both mates, the male and female cross their necks as they reach for sticks, with the male usually crossing over the female due to its larger stature.
Copulation clattering	This display is performed during copulation which can last between 10 and 22 seconds. The male might open and close its bill during this display, but the clattering sounds actually comes from the male's bill striking the female's.	The male steps onto the back of the female, hooks his feet over her shoulders and bends his legs for cloacal contact. The female opens her wings slightly and her bill between 45° and 90° downwards. The male shakes its head violently from side to side while slapping the bill of the female at a rate of ~4 times per second.

=== Nestling specific behavior ===
==== Comfort movements ====
The comfort movements of the nestlings are exactly the same as those of the parents. They include the typical preening, scratching and stretching as well as the spread-wing sunning and urohidrosis for thermoregulation.

==== Social displays ====
===== Displays towards parents =====
For the first 55 days of their life, the nestlings depend on their parents for everything. They are confined to the nest and rely on their parents for food and water. For the first few weeks of their life, they remain dependant on their parents for protection from predators.

The main display that nestlings exhibit towards their parents is called the Begging Display. During this display, the nestlings drop down as the parent approach with their body almost horizontal. They then open their wings and pump them up and down rhythmically while giving weak and sporadic "yes" nods and occasional jerky "no" nods. They accompany these movements of nasal chittering vocalizations that are timed with the upwards motion of the head.

===== Displays toward other individuals =====
African openbill nestling only perform one display towards other individuals, which is named the Nestling Defense display. It is used when any individual unknown to the nestling approaches too close to the nest. This can be other adults from the same colony or even birds of different species. Overall, the display resembles the Begging Display with a few exceptions. During this display, the feathers of the head, neck, breast and upper back are strongly erect, the wings are held farther out from the sides and the nestlings makes high pitched screams and gobbling sounds as they try to grab at their opponent.

== Breeding ==
African openbill storks are opportunistic breeders. The species forms monogamous pairs and breeding colonies usually contain less than 60 pairs. These colonies can either be formed of only African openbills or be mixed with cormorants, herons, African spoonbills, African darters and other storks. The breeding success of the African openbill stork is estimated to be less than one young per pair per year.

=== Breeding season ===
The occurrence of the breeding season varies with distribution as the hatching of the nestling is timed to coincide with the emergence of snails. It can start either just before, at the beginning of or late in the rainy season. The bulk of the breeding season occurs during the rainy season and peaks in January–March. The rainy season lasts from August to May.

=== Pair formation ===
The males of a colony will select a nest spot and display on it. Females will move from tree to tree, trying to approach the male's nest spots. The males repeatedly drive away the females. Violent fights can erupt between the potential pairs if the females approach the nest too quickly. Eventually, the male accepts the female as a mate and allows her to come near into the nest spot for copulation. Overall, males dominate the mate selection process as they have the final say of who they mate with.

=== Nest construction ===
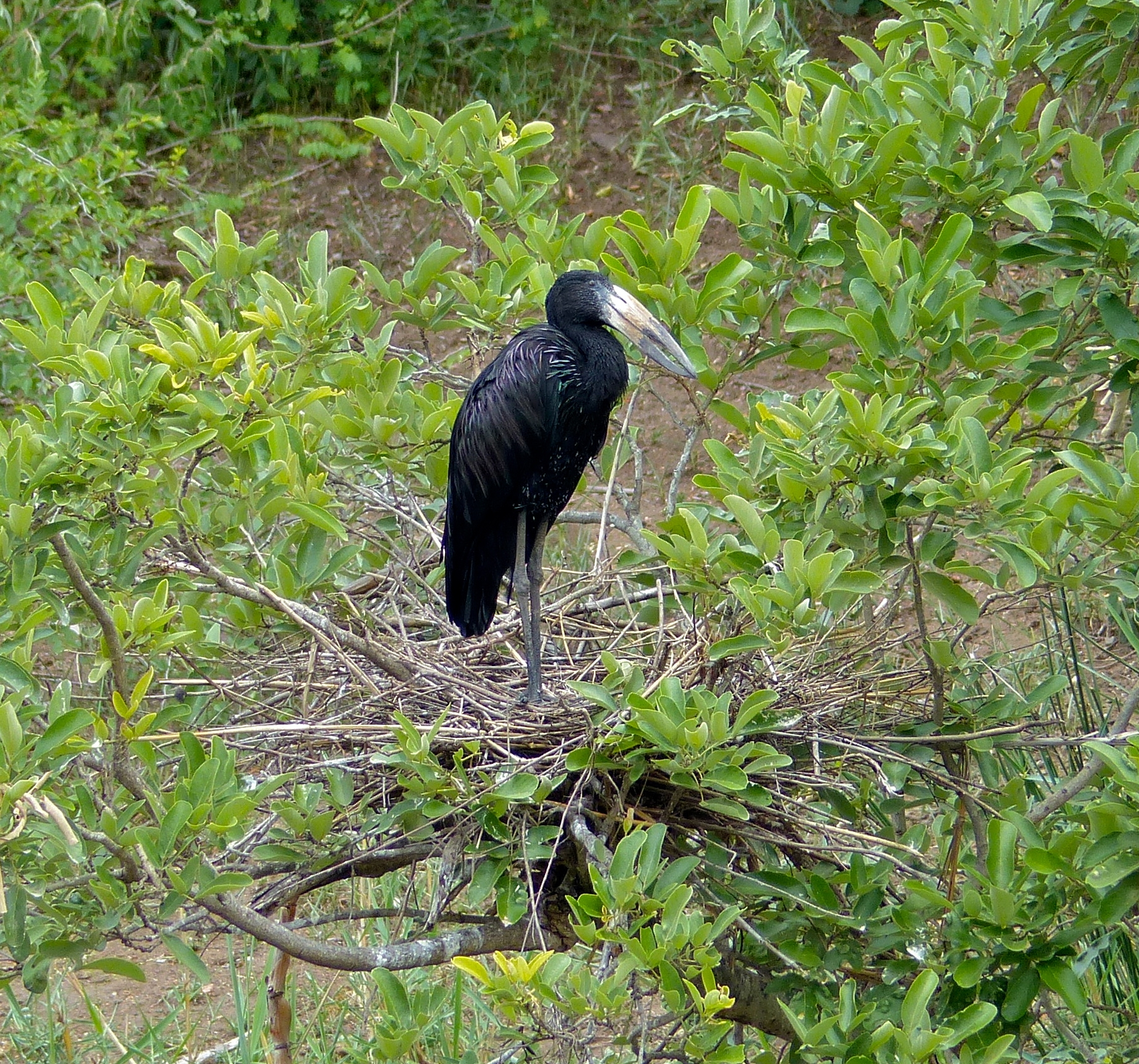
An African openbill in its nest

African openbill storks' nest in tall trees and often favor the lowest branches of those trees. The nest which usually takes up to a week to build and both sexes contribute to the construction. The African openbill builds a nest that is around 50 cm (20 in) wide, which is relatively small for this medium-sized bird. The nest consists of a thin platform of sticks and twigs, lined with leaves, grasses, sedges and other aquatic plants.

=== Parental care ===
The female African openbill will lay 3 to 4 eggs. These are oval and chalky white. Both parents will then care for the eggs through the incubation period of 25–30 days. When taking care of the eggs, the parents can occasionally be seen regurgitating water over them. The exact nature of this behaviour remains unknown, but scientists believe it serves to cool down the eggs. Once the chicks have hatched, parental care continues to be shared by both parents and both the male and female will bring food and care for the hatchlings. After 50–55 days in the nest, the chicks will fledge and leave the nest.

== Threats ==
Habitat loss, disturbances of feeding areas, pollution from pesticide used on mosquitoes and entanglement in fishing lines all pose potential threats to these birds. The African openbill does remain common in habitats suitable for them, but human activity could pose a danger to the species.

=== Pesticide poisoning ===
In Kenya, the African openbill stork is subject to deliberate poisoning from poachers. They are being poisoned through a special baiting technique that uses a live decoy. The poachers set up the decoy and then disturb flocks of storks so that they have no other choice than to settle near the decoy. The African openbill feed directly on the snails near the decoy which have been poisoned by the poachers. This method disproportionately affects the African openbill stork because they are a flocking species that lives year-round on the areas poisoned by the poachers. They are also preferentially poisoned because poachers can turn a greater profit from these birds. The stork isn't currently at risk, but the continuation of this method of poaching could be detrimental to the populations. This practice continues in Kenya because of the social importance of eating wild bird meat. It has become a habit of the population as the people believe wild meat is the best available option, especially when it is not expensive.

=== Impacts of DDT ===
In South Africa, DDT remains in use to control malaria. This pesticide ends up in the environment and affects the local species. Studies have been carried out on the amount of DDT present in different African birds' eggs. They have found that the eggs of the African openbill had the highest means of DDT. The snails eaten by the storks live in sediments and bio-concentrate DDT because they filter the contaminated water and feed on contaminated plankton. The high amount of DDT in African openbill eggs can be explained by their consumption of highly contaminated snails.

No investigation has been made yet on the impact of high DDT content in eggs. Since the effect of this high concentration of contaminants hasn't been researched yet, it is impossible to know the impact it might have on the stork population. The biggest risk is the thinning of the eggshells which would reduce the breeding success of the storks. This success being already very low, it would be dangerous for the survival of the species if it were to drop even lower.
