= Joseph B. MacInnis =

Canadian physician, author, poet and aquanaut

- Born: Joseph Beverly MacInnis; 2 March 1937 (age 89); Barrie, Ontario, Canada
- Education: University of Toronto
- Occupations: Physician; author; diver
- Awards: Order of Canada

Joseph Beverly MacInnis CM (born 2 March 1937) is a Canadian physician, author, and diver. In 1974, MacInnis was the first scientist to dive in the near-freezing waters beneath the North Pole. In 1976 he became a member of the Order of Canada.

MacInnis currently studies leadership in high risk environments and gives leadership presentations in North America and Europe. His audiences have included Microsoft, IBM, National Geographic, Rolex, Visa, Toyota and the U.S. Naval Academy.

MacInnis led ten research expeditions under the Arctic Ocean. He was among the first people to dive to the wreck of the RMS Titanic. In 2012 he was a medical advisor and journalist on the James Cameron-National Geographic seven-mile science dive into the Mariana Trench.

MacInnis has worked with the U.S. Navy, the Canadian Forces and the Russian Academy of Sciences. He has written ten books. His latest, Deep Leadership: Essential Insights from High Risk Environments, was published by Random House.

== Education and early career ==
MacInnis is of Isle of Mull Scottish descent. He was born in Barrie, Ontario, but grew up in Toronto, where his family moved after his father, a Royal Canadian Air Force instructor, died in a plane crash when MacInnis was a few months old. MacInnis was raised by his mother, who remarried when he was 12. He attended high school at Upper Canada College.

MacInnis first learned to scuba dive in 1954 in the waters off Florida. He attended the University of Toronto, where he was the captain of the swim team in the mid-1950s. While at the university, he joined Delta Kappa Epsilon Fraternity. MacInnis held the Canadian record for the breaststroke and tried unsuccessfully to make the Canadian Olympic team in 1956. MacInnis received his MD from the University of Toronto in 1962. He spent his internship at the Toronto General Hospital, where an experience with a tunnel construction worker suffering from decompression sickness helped to point MacInnis toward his post-graduate studies in diving medicine. MacInnis arranged for the worker, John McGean, to be transported to a pressure chamber in Buffalo, New York, where he was successfully treated. MacInnis also interned at the Hospital for Sick Children in Toronto, Ontario.

== Man-In-Sea and Ocean Systems ==
After his junior internship, MacInnis hoped to work with inventor and entrepreneur Edwin Link in the field of deep diving, but had no idea how to reach him. In fall 1963 MacInnis placed a person-to-person telephone call to Link, who agreed to meet with him for fifteen minutes the next day at the Navy Yard in Washington, D.C. At the interview, Link offered MacInnis a position as the full-time doctor for his Man-In-Sea Project. MacInnis received a Link Foundation Fellowship to study diving medicine under Christian J. Lambertsen at the University of Pennsylvania. In 1964, MacInnis became medical director of Man-In-Sea. During his studies at the University of Pennsylvania, MacInnis was a member of a Canadian Broadcasting Corporation filming expedition to Cocos Island, where a group of treasure hunters were seeking the fabled hoard of Benito Bonito and the Treasure of Lima.

In June–July 1964, MacInnis participated as a life support specialist when Link conducted his second Man in Sea experiment in the Berry Islands (a chain in the Bahamas) with Robert Sténuit and Jon Lindbergh, one of the sons of Charles Lindbergh. Sténuit and Lindbergh stayed in Link's SPID habitat (Submersible, Portable, Inflatable Dwelling) for 49 hours underwater at a depth of 432 feet, breathing a helium-oxygen mixture. The dive was successful, although MacInnis made a potentially grave error by placing a cover without a pressure-equalizing valve on a carbon dioxide-filtering device.

In 1965, MacInnis became medical director of Link's new company, Ocean Systems Inc. His activities that year included a simulated 650-foot dive in a laboratory pressure chamber and winning a Gold Medal of Excellence at the International Film Festival in Santa Monica for his film, Deep Androsia.

In March 1967, Link launched Deep Diver, the first small submersible designed for lockout diving, allowing divers to leave and enter the craft while underwater. Deep Diver carried out many scientific missions in 1967 and 1968, including a 430-foot lockout dive in 1967 (at the same location as the 1964 Sténuit-Lindbergh dive) and a 700-foot lockout dive near Great Stirrup Cay in 1968. MacInnis participated in both of these dives as an observer in Deep Diver's forward chamber.

In September 1967 MacInnis took part in a classified Ocean Systems mission aboard Deep Diver on the Grand Banks south of Newfoundland. A cable plow, rumored to be used for burying a strategic communications cable, had been lost in 400 feet of water. Two Navy divers had already been killed trying to recover it. MacInnis was one of a crew of four Ocean Systems personnel who unsuccessfully attempted to recover the cable plow using the submersible. The mission was called off due to rising winds, and Deep Diver was barely brought safely back aboard the Canadian Coast Guard vessel CCGS John Cabot. In 1968 MacInnis took part in a saturation dive aboard the Hydrolab underwater habitat with two other aquanauts, spending 50 hours at a depth of 50 feet, and in the search for the lost submarine USS Scorpion. In late 1968 and early 1969, MacInnis took part in salvage operations after the crash of Pan Am Flight 217 near Caracas, Venezuela.

In 1969 MacInnis served as a medical consultant on the U.S. Navy's SEALAB III project, and was on site the day after the death of aquanaut Berry L. Cannon. MacInnis designed and built Sublimnos, the first Canadian underwater habitat, which was placed in Georgian Bay near Tobermory, Ontario, in June 1969. Sublimnos had an "open hatch" policy, allowing access to any diver with a legitimate reason to use the habitat. In July 1969 MacInnis attended the Apollo 11 launch at Cape Kennedy, then traveled to Tobermory, where he dived to Sublimnos and looked up through the water at the Moon at the very moment the astronauts were walking on it.

== Arctic research ==
MacInnis first met Pierre Trudeau, the Prime Minister of Canada, in late 1969. Trudeau and MacInnis would make approximately fifty dives together over the years. In 1970 Trudeau asked MacInnis to help write Canada's first national ocean policy. MacInnis began a series of ten research expeditions to study techniques for working under the Arctic Ocean. Also in 1970, MacInnis founded the James Allister MacInnis Foundation for underwater research and education in Canada. In March 1971 MacInnis was a member of a Canadian Broadcasting Corporation crew filming Harp seals in the Gulf of St. Lawrence. Author and conservationist Farley Mowat was another member of the expedition. Mowat also helped encourage MacInnis to write. Also in 1971, MacInnis helped oversee the successful decompression of Ocean Systems diver Bill Maltman after he was fouled in wreckage while taking part in salvage operations in the wake of the crash of a B-52 into Lake Michigan. The same year, MacInnis published Underwater Images, a book of poetry accompanied by photographs of undersea life taken by MacInnis.

In 1972, MacInnis led the team that constructed Sub-Igloo, the first manned underwater station in the Arctic Ocean. MacInnis took part in a telephone call from Sub-Igloo to Prime Minister Trudeau in Ottawa, Ontario. MacInnis visited the Soviet Union for the first time in autumn 1973 as part of a scientific exchange program, and showed a short film about his underwater polar research in Moscow and Leningrad. In 1974, MacInnis was the first scientist to dive beneath the North Pole. By 1975, MacInnis had taken part in more than 100 major dives and expeditions. In that year, he escorted Charles, Prince of Wales, on a dive under Arctic ice at Resolute Bay. Also in 1975, the MacInnis Foundation donated Sublimnos to Seneca College of Applied Arts and Technology, where it was installed in Lake Seneca at the King City, Ontario, campus.

MacInnis was awarded the Order of Canada on 14 January 1976 and was invested on 7 April 1976. In 1979, he was accompanied on a dive beneath the North Pole by Edward Schreyer, the Governor General of Canada.

== The Breadalbane ==
While diving in 1975, MacInnis found a fragment of the Breadalbane, the northernmost known shipwreck in the world, a British merchant ship that sank in the Arctic in 1853. MacInnis headed the first expedition to find the wreck of Breadalbane in August 1978. In August 1980, after a three-year search, the ship was discovered by Coast Guard cutter John A. Macdonald using side-scan sonar. The first images showed her hull intact and two of her masts still standing.

In 1981, supported by the Canadian Coast Guard, the National Geographic Society, and others, the group returned. A remotely piloted submersible was used to examine the wreck, which took the first colour photographs and video footage. The images showed the bow, masts, rudder and anchor. The wood appeared new.

In 1983, further visits to the Breadalbane were conducted by Sea-Otter, a submersible, and the WASP, an atmospheric diving suit similar to the Newtsuit.

== Titanic and Edmund Fitzgerald expeditions ==
In 1985, MacInnis was an adviser to the team that discovered the wreck of the RMS Titanic. Between 1985 and 1991 MacInnis made dives in the Russian MIRs research submersibles and the French submersible Nautile, including his first visit to the Titanic in a submersible, in 1987 aboard the Nautile, and a descent 16,400 feet into King's Trough in the eastern North Atlantic aboard Mir 1 with National Geographic photographer Emory Kristof and Russian explorer Anatoly Sagalevich. In 1991, he co-led with Sagalevitch the expedition to the Titanic which made the IMAX film Titanica, on which he served as co-executive producer. On this occasion MacInnis dove to the Titanic's bridge deck.

In July 1994, MacInnis organized and led six publicly funded dives to the SS Edmund Fitzgerald over a three-day period. Harbor Branch Oceanographic Institution provided the Edwin A. Link as the support vessel, and their manned submersible, the Celia. The Great Lakes Shipwreck Historical Society (GLSHS) paid $10,000 for three of its members to each join a dive and take still pictures. MacInnis concluded that the notes and video obtained during the dives did not provide an explanation of why the Fitzgerald sank. MacInnis helped organize another series of dives in July 1995 to salvage the bell from the Fitzgerald. Canadian engineer Phil Nuytten's atmospheric diving suit, the Newtsuit, was used to retrieve the bell from the ship, replace it with a replica, and put a beer can in the Fitzgerald's pilothouse. At MacInnis' suggestion, the replica bell was inscribed with the names of the Fitzgerald's crew.

== Recent activities ==
From 1996 to 2004 MacInnis was the chair of TD Financial Group's Friends of the Environment Foundation. In October 2001, MacInnis visited the exterior of the Aquarius underwater laboratory near Key Largo during the first of the NASA/NOAA NEEMO missions there. He shook hands underwater with Canadian astronaut/aquanaut Dafydd Williams.

In 2003, MacInnis accompanied filmmaker James Cameron on the Disney-IMAX expedition to the Atlantic and Pacific Oceans which resulted in the 3-D film, Aliens of the Deep. MacInnis' companion book to the film, James Cameron's Aliens of the Deep, was published in 2004. In 2005, MacInnis joined Cameron's Discovery Channel expedition which explored the last unseen rooms inside Titanic and broadcast live television pictures from the wreck. In March 2012, MacInnis served as expedition physician for Cameron's solo dive to the bottom of the Mariana Trench in the Deepsea Challenger submersible.

As part of his ongoing research into leadership in life-threatening environments, in 2010 MacInnis spent time with members of the Canadian Armed Forces in order to research military leadership. This included a visit to Canadian forces in Kandahar, Afghanistan.

MacInnis has received six honorary degrees, the Queen's Anniversary Medal and the Admiral's Medal. In 2008, he received the degree of Doctor of Science, honoris causa, from Lakehead University. MacInnis is a Member of the Pierre Elliott Trudeau Foundation.

MacInnis is the president of Undersea Research Ltd., a consulting company which he founded in Toronto in 1968. He is the creator of Wisdom Keepers, a video series featuring interviews with older people of accomplishment in various fields. He has written for such publications as National Geographic, Wired and Scientific American. He makes frequent motivational speeches to Fortune 500 companies.

== Personal life ==
MacInnis is a jazz aficionado. He has counted many astronauts and aquanauts among his personal friends. His son, Jeff MacInnis (born in 1963), has led a sailing expedition through the Northwest Passage. As of 1965, MacInnis lived near the Town of Port Credit, in what is now Mississauga.

== Publications ==
- MacInnis, Joseph B. (1966). "The Medical and Human Performance Problems of Living Under the Sea". Canadian Medical Association Journal.
- MacInnis, Joseph (1971). Underwater Images. McClelland and Stewart Limited. ISBN 0-7710-5525-0.
- MacInnis, Joseph B. (1973). The James Allister MacInnis Foundation Arctic Diving Expeditions.
- MacInnis, Joe (Foreword by Pierre Elliot Trudeau) (1975). Underwater Man. Dodd, Mead & Company. ISBN 0-396-07142-2.
- MacInnis, Joe (Introduction by Walter Cronkite) (1982). The Breadalbane Adventure. Optimum Publishing International. ISBN 0-88890-159-3.
- MacInnis, Joe (1985). The Land That Devours Ships: The Search for the Breadalbane. (Revised edition of The Breadalbane Adventure.) CBC Enterprises. ISBN 0-88794-196-6.
- MacInnis, Joseph (1992). Titanic In a New Light. Thomasson-Grant. ISBN 1-56566-025-0.
- MacInnis, Joseph (general editor) (1992). Saving the Oceans. Key Porter Books. ISBN 1-55013-416-7.
- MacInnis, Joseph (1997). Fitzgerald's Storm: The Wreck of the Edmund Fitzgerald. Macmillan Canada. ISBN 0-7715-7467-3.
- MacInnis, Joseph (2002). Surviving Terrorism: How to Protect Your Health, Wealth and Safety. Deep Anchor Press. ISBN 0-9730810-0-7.
- MacInnis, Joe (2004). Breathing Underwater: The Quest to Live in the Sea. Penguin Canada. ISBN 0-670-04397-4.
- MacInnis, Joseph (Introduction by James Cameron) (2004). James Cameron's Aliens of the Deep. National Geographic Society. ISBN 0-7922-9343-6.
- MacInnis, Joe (2012). Deep Leadership: Essential Insights from High-Risk Environments. Alfred A. Knopf Canada. ISBN 978-0-307-36110-3.
