= Emory Kristof =

American photographer (1942–2023)

- Born: November 19, 1942; Laurel, Maryland, U.S.
- Died: February 6, 2023 (aged 80); Northfield, Massachusetts, U.S.
- Education: University of Maryland
- Occupation: Photographer

Emory Kristof (November 19, 1942 – February 6, 2023) was an American photographer. He was on the expedition that discovered the Titanic. His work has been published in National Geographic Magazine and elsewhere.

== Life and career ==
Kristof was born in Laurel, Maryland, on November 19, 1942.

Kristof participated in multiple undersea expeditions with Canadian explorers Joseph MacInnis and Phil Nuytten, including the exploration of the Breadalbane, the world's northernmost known shipwreck, and the 1995 expedition to recover the bell from the wreck of the SS Edmund Fitzgerald. Kristof also accompanied MacInnis and Russian explorer Anatoly Sagalevich on a descent 16,400 feet into Kings Trough in the eastern North Atlantic aboard the submersible Mir 1, and on the expedition which made the IMAX film Titanica.

Kristof served as Supervising Producer of 2003 IMAX documentary, Volcanoes of the Deep Sea, about the ecosystems surrounding hydrothermal vents.

Kristof died Northfield, Massachusetts, on February 6, 2023, at the age of 80.

== Awards ==
- NOGI Awards for Arts, the Underwater Society of America, 1988
- Northeast Diver of the Year, Beneath the Sea, 1988
- The J. Winton Lemon Fellowship Award, National Press Photographers Association, 1998
- Wired (magazine) 25, Class of 1998
