= Urohidrosis =

Cooling mechanism in birds

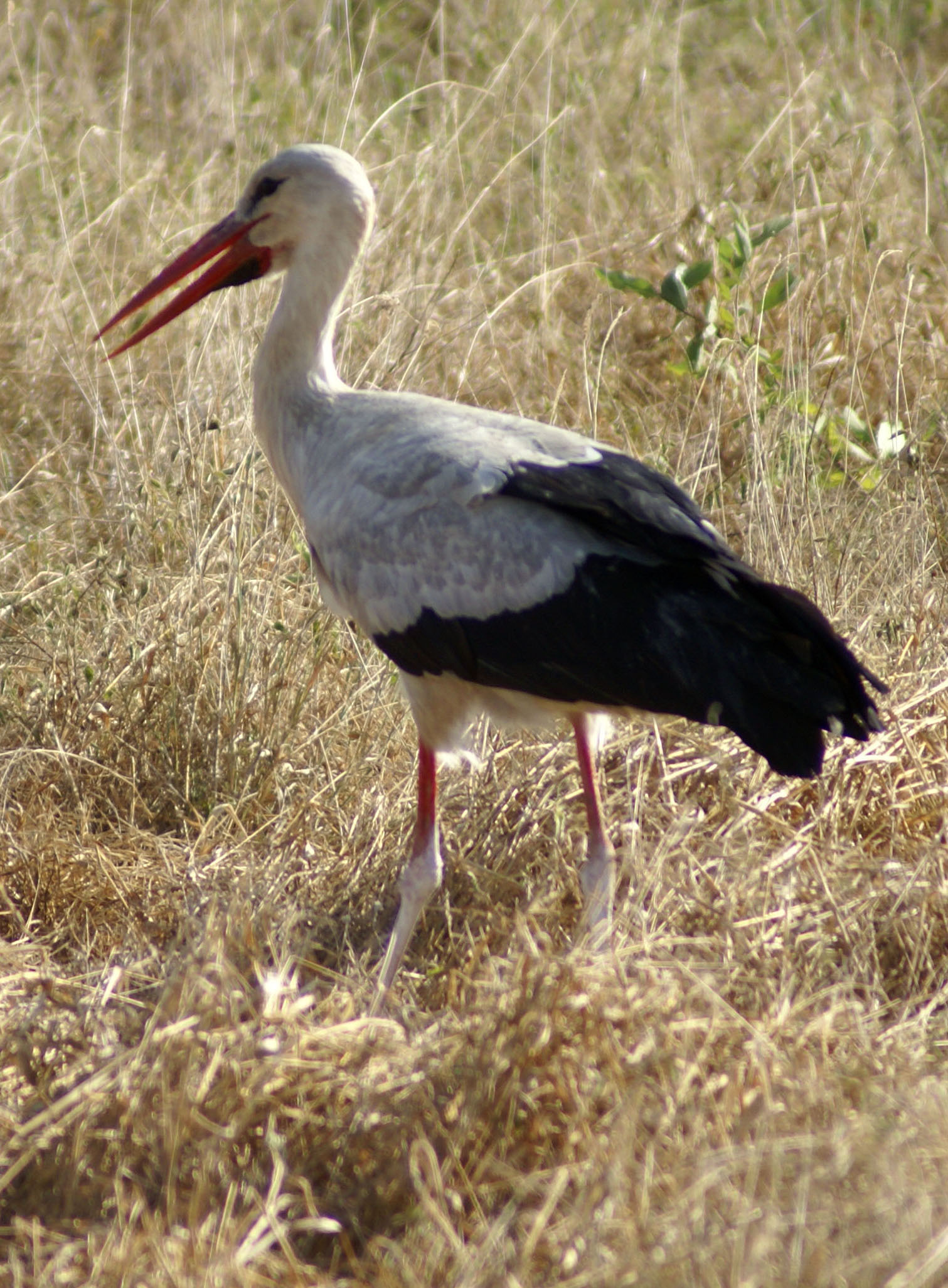
A white stork in Tsavo East National Park, Kenya. The lower parts of its legs are covered with whitish droppings

Urohidrosis (sometimes misspelled "urohydrosis") is the habit in some birds of defecating onto the scaly portions of the legs as a cooling mechanism, using evaporative cooling of the fluids. Birds' droppings consist of both feces and urine, which are excreted together through the cloaca.

== Etymology ==
Hidrosis is the medical term for sweating from Ancient Greek, and the word "urohidrosis" was coined by M. P. Kahl in 1963:

...Because of its apparent functional similarity to true sweating, I suggest the term urohidrosis (Greek: ouron = urine; hidrōs = sweat) for this phenomenon.

== Examples ==
Several species of storks and New World vultures exhibit this behaviour. This behaviour leads to accumulation of droppings around leg rings on ringed birds, which can lead to injury.

The term is also used to describe the analogous behaviour in seals that cool themselves while basking by urinating on their hind flippers.
