= Scott Wallace (photojournalist) =

American journalist

Scott Wallace (born 1954) is a freelance writer, producer, and photojournalist and a contributor to National Geographic magazine and National Geographic Adventure. He is the author of The Unconquered: In Search of the Amazon's Last Uncontacted Tribes (2011).

== Career ==
Wallace began his career as a reporter for CBS News Radio, The Atlanta Journal-Constitution in El Salvador in 1983. He moved his base of operations from El Salvador to Nicaragua in 1985 in order to cover the escalating Contra War and the Reagan Administration's efforts to oust the leftist Sandinista government. He continued writing for Cox Newspapers until early 1986, by which time he was writing for Newsweek and The Independent (UK). He moved to Guatemala in early 1989 and became Central America Correspondent for The Guardian.

Since the early 1990s, Wallace has worked as a magazine writer and photographer, while producing long-form network news magazine programs on war, international organized crime, indigenous affairs, and the environment. From 1997 to 1999 Wallace worked for the Utica Observer Dispatch in Utica New York as a special projects, immigration and police reporter. The bulk of Wallace's work has been for the various entities of National Geographic, including National Geographic magazine, National Geographic Adventure, National Geographic Traveler, and the National Geographic Channel.

Wallace was contracted by the World Bank to document Bank-financed projects around the world in 2004. His travels took him to Morocco, Senegal, Mauritania, Tanzania, Eritrea, Yemen, Bulgaria, Turkey, India, Bangladesh, Thailand, Peru, Brazil, and Colombia. Following his work with the World Bank, Wallace worked on assignment for National Geographic and accompanied conservationist George Schaller on an expedition into the remote Wakhan Corridor of Afghanistan's Badakshan Province. Over the course of two months, Wallace and Schaller travelled by foot, horseback and yak; the journey was featured in the December 2006/January 2007 edition of National Geographic Adventure.

== Writing, television, and photography ==
Wallace's writing has appeared in National Geographic, National Geographic Adventure, National Geographic Traveler, Harper's, Sports Afield, Conde Nast Traveler, Newsweek, Interview, The Nation, and the Village Voice among many other publications.

Television credits include the CBS Evening News, CBS News "Eye to Eye", CNN, Fox News, NYT/Video News International, and the National Geographic Channel.

Photography credits include: National Geographic, Outside, Details, Interview, Newsweek, The Washington Post, Smithsonian magazine, The Economist, and The New York Times.

== Works ==
Books

- Central America in the Crosshairs of War: On the Road from Vietnam to Iraq, George F Thompson Publishing, 2024. ISBN 978-1-960521-01-9
- The Unconquered: In Search of the Amazon's Last Uncontacted Tribes, Crown, 2011. ISBN 978-0-307-46296-1

Anthologies

- "La Post-Guerra." Gangs: Stories of Life and Death in the Streets. Da Capo Press 2002.
- "A Death in San Salvador." The Bedside Guardian: 38 (Selections from The Guardian 1988-89). London 1989.

Photographic exhibitions

Photographic exhibitions: "In the Crosshairs: Dispatches From Central America, 1983-1990, Dodd Center for Human Rights, University of Connecticut, 2019. "Salvador-Nicaragua: Two Faces/One War" supported by a grant from the New York State Council on the Arts (NYSCA), appeared at Kirkland Arts Center, Clinton, New York, 1999. His exhibition, "Baghdad, USA: Recent Photojournalism from Iraq," appeared at the Banning + Low Gallery, Kensington, MD in 2004.
