= Tim Folger =

American science and nature writer

Tim Folger is an American science and nature writer. He is a contributing editor at Discover Magazine and writes about science for several other magazines. Folger has been the "series editor" of The Best American Science and Nature Writing yearly anthology since 2002. He won the 2007 American Institute of Physics Science Writing Award.

== Bibliography ==
- "A question of gravitas". Discover. 16 (7): 38–39. July 1995.
- "A breed apart". Discover. 17 (1): 67. January 1996.
- "Walking at Turkana". Discover. 17 (1): 68. January 1996.
- "The first masterpieces". Discover. 17 (1): 70–71. January 1996.
- "If an electron can be in two places at once, why can't you?". Discover. June 2005.
- "Last ice". National Geographic. 233 (1): 90–109. January 2018.
