= Maggie Steber =

American documentary photographer

- Born: Electra, Texas
- Education: University of Texas
- Known for: Photography
- Awards: Alicia Patterson Foundation Grant, Ernst Haas Grant, John S. and James L. Knight Foundation Grant, Guggenheim Foundation Grant, Pulitzer Prize Finalist, Lucie Award
- Website: maggiesteber.com

Maggie Steber is an American documentary photographer. Her work has documented a wide range of issues, including the African slave trade, Native American issues in the United States, natural disasters, and science.

Steber has produced the book Dancing on Fire: Photographs from Haiti. She is a member of VII Photo Agency and has been awarded a first prize World Press Photo award and a Guggenheim Fellowship.

== Life and work ==
Steber was born in Texas. She studied journalism and art at the University of Texas at Austin. Early in her career, she lived and worked in Galveston, Texas, working as a reporter and photographer for The Galveston Daily News and as a picture editor for the Associated Press in New York City. Steber was a director of photography for the Miami Herald and is a contributor to magazines including Life, The New York Times Magazine, The New Yorker, Smithsonian, People, Newsweek, Time, Sports Illustrated, The Sunday Times Magazine, and Merian Magazine of Germany.

Steber has worked in Haiti for over 25 years documenting the history and culture of the Haitian people. Her essays on Haiti have appeared in The New York Times and she has a monograph titled Dancing on Fire: Photographs from Haiti.

National Geographic has published her essays on Miami, the African slave trade, the Cherokee Nation, sleep, soldiers’ letters, Dubai and a story on the science of memory. Steber was one of eleven photographers included in National Geographic's 2013 exhibition, Women of Vision: National Geographic Photographers on Assignment.

Steber is a member of VII Photo Agency. She is also a member of Facing Change Documenting America, a group of civic-minded photographers covering important American issues. She currently lives in Miami, Florida.

== Publications ==
=== Publications by Steber ===
- Dancing on Fire: Photographs from Haiti. New York City: Aperture, 1991. ISBN 978-0893814977.

=== Publications with contributions by Steber ===
- Facing Change: Documenting America. Prestel, 2015. ISBN 978-3791348360.

== Awards ==
- 1987: 1st prize, Spot News single image category, World Press Photo award, Amsterdam
- Leica Medal of Honor
- The Ernst Haas Photographers Grant
- Overseas Press Club Oliver Rebbot Award for Best Photographic Coverage from Abroad
- 1998: Alicia Patterson Foundation Fellowship for "Photographing and Reporting on Haiti after Duvalier"
- 2007: John S. and James L. Knight Foundation grant
- 2017: Guggenheim Fellowship from the John Simon Guggenheim Memorial Foundation
- 2019: Pulitzer Prize, Finalist in Feature Photography with Lynn Johnson for National Geographic, "For a compelling, dignified photo narrative that provides an intimate look at the youngest face transplant recipient in the U.S."
