= Robert W. Madden =

American photographer

- Born: Robert West Madden
- Education: University of Wisconsin–Platteville (BS); University of Missouri
- Occupation: Photographer

Robert West Madden (born 20th century) is an American photographer.

He was a staff photographer for National Geographic magazine. He held many positions at the National Geographic Society, including picture editor for World (now National Geographic Kids) magazine and the National Geographic Book Service.

Between 1986 and 1992, as senior assistant editor and director of layout and design, he was in charge of the presentation of all visual material in National Geographic. Over this period, he and his fellow workers won many awards for photography, art, and design. In 1966, he was named College Photographer of the Year; in 1971, U.S. Photographer of the Year; and in 1976, Magazine Photographer of the Year. The Overseas Press Club designated his coverage of the 1976 Guatemala earthquake as that year's Best Photographic Coverage From Abroad.

He received a silver award of distinctive merit from the Society of Publication Designers and was commended by the New York Art Directors Club and the Communication Arts magazine, among others.

He graduated from the University of Wisconsin–Platteville with a Bachelor of Science degree in English and history and received its Distinguished Alumni Award. He studied photojournalism at the University of Missouri and later worked as a correspondent for the Madison (Wisconsin) Capital Times and as a photographer for the Dubuque (Iowa) Telegraph Herald.
