= Gordon Gahan =

American photographer

Gordon W. Gahan
- Born: November 5, 1945; Washington Heights, Manhattan, New York City, New York
- Died: October 19, 1984 (aged 38); Virgin Islands
- Occupation: Photographer

Gordon Ward Gahan (November 5, 1945 – October 19, 1984) was an American photographer.

== Biography ==
Gahan was born at Sloane Hospital for Women in Washington Heights, Manhattan, to Alice M. Ward (housewife, age 37), and Edmund Gahan (owner of an oil well supply business, age 48). He attended Harrison High School, where he played on the football team. He attended Phillips Exeter Academy (1959-1963), where he served on the Photographic Boards of the Exonian and the Yearbook. He attended Columbia University (1963-1964). He worked for United Press International (1965-1966), then was drafted into the United States Army, and worked as a photographer in Vietnam during the Vietnam War (1966-1968).

Gahan is best known for his contributions to the National Geographic in the 1970s and 1980s. He began working for the National Geographic Society in 1968 as a contract photographer, and joined the staff in 1972. Assignments took Gahan around the world—to Japan, Kenya, Senegal, Egypt, Israel, Turkey, Greece, Soviet Union, East and West Germany, France, Switzerland, Portugal, England, Canada, United States, Mexico, Brazil, Guatemala, Belize, Panama, Bolivia, Peru, Colombia, Argentina, Australia, New Zealand, Vanuatu, French Polynesia, and Tonga. He left the National Geographic Society in 1982 to co-found Prism Photography Inc., with Martin Rogers and Howie Shneyer, in New York City.

Gahan died in 1984, while taking aerial photographs in the Virgin Islands for a client. He and his assistant, Joseph Capitelli, died along with the pilot when a helicopter crashed near St. Thomas during the photo shoot.

== Awards ==
Gahan's photography has won awards including the 1969 and 1970 Pictures of the Year competition sponsored by the National Press Photographers Association and the University of Missouri School of Journalism. Gahan's work has been exhibited at the Corcoran Gallery and at Harvard University. Gahan was introduced to US President Richard Nixon at the White House in 1972.

== Published works ==
=== National Geographic issues with contributions by Gordon Gahan ===
- The Coming Revolution in Transportation, September 1969, pp. 301–341
- The Lights Are Up at Ford’s Theatre, Mar. 1970, pp. 392–401
- In Search of Man's Past at Lake Rudolf, May 1970, pp. 712–734
- The Exquisite Orchids, Apr. 1971, pp. 484–513
- Maui, Where Old Hawaii Still Lives, Apr. 1971, pp. 514–543
- Captain Cook: The Man Who Mapped the Pacific, September 1971, pp. 297–349
- The More Paris Changes...., July 1972, pp. 64–103
- Drought Bedevils Brazil's Sertão, November 1972, pp. 704–723
- Israel—The Seventh Day, December 1972, pp. 816–855
- This Changing Earth, January 1973, pp. 1–37
- France’s Wild, Watery South, the Camargue, May 1973, pp. 696–726
- Mexico, the City That Founded a Nation, May 1973, pp. 638–669
- East Germany: The Struggle to Succeed, September 1974, pp. 295–329
- Queen Elizabeth's Favorite Sea Dog: Sir Francis Drake, February 1975, pp. 216–253
- Nova Scotia, the Magnificent Anchorage, March 1975, pp. 334–363
- Turkey: Cross Fire at an Ancient Crossroads, July 1977, pp. 88–123
- Imperial Russia's Glittering Legacy, January 1978, pp. 24–33
- Moscow: The City Around Red Square, January 1978, pp. 2–45
- Minoans and Mycenaeans: Greece's Brilliant Bronze Age, February 1978, pp. 142–185*Texas! National Geographic Magazine, Apr. 1980, pp. 440–483
- Napoleon, February 1982, pp. 142–189
- Santa Fe: Goal at the End of the Trail, March 1982, pp. 322–345

=== National Geographic Society books with photographs by Gordon Gahan ===
- The Renaissance: Maker of Modern Man, 1970
- Great Religions of the World, 1971
- A Day in the Woods, 1975
- Mysteries of the Ancient World, 1979
- Voyages to Paradise: Exploring in the Wake of Captain Cook, 1981

== Selected bibliography ==
- Michael Kukler, "Mike Garfield and Gordon W. Gahan," National Vietnam Veterans Review, [June 1982?]
- "Obituaries: Gordon Gahan, Photographer, Killed in Crash", The Washington Post, October 21, 1984
- Jane Livingston. Odyssey: the art of photography at National Geographic. Corcoran Gallery of Art, Washington DC, 1988. Photo on Plate no. 237; bio on p. 352
- C.D.B. Bryan. The National Geographic Society: 100 Years of Adventure and Discovery. Abrams, 1997
