= Lynn Johnson (photographer) =

American photographer (born 1953)

- Born: 1953 (age 72–73); Pittsburgh, PA, U.S.
- Education: Rochester Institute of Technology
- Occupation: Documentary photographer
- Website: http://www.lynnjohnsonphoto.com

Lynn Johnson (born 1953) is an American photographer known for her contributions to National Geographic, Sports Illustrated and Life among others. Johnson is known for photographing vanishing languages and challenges to the human condition, with a focus on Africa and Asia.

== Biography ==
Johnson received her bachelor's degree in photojournalism in 1975 from the Rochester Institute of Technology. Upon graduating she became the first woman staff photographer at the Pittsburgh Press, until departing in 1982 to pursue freelance work with Black Star Publishing Company and the Aurora photo agency. In 1984 the University of Pittsburgh Press published her book Pittsburgh Moments. She photographed Fred Rogers several times between 1980 and the early 2000s, and her photographs of Rogers were featured in the 2018 documentary Won't You Be My Neighbor? Johnson's photos of and working relationship with Rogers appeared in an NPR photo story titled "The Man Behind Mister Rogers, Away From The Neighborhood Of Make-Believe."

After working for nearly 30 years as a photojournalist, Johnson attended Ohio University's School of Visual Communications in the Scripps College of Communication as a master's student and recipient of the school's Knight Fellowship, graduating in 2004. In 2011 she donated her collection of analogue film photography to the Mahn Center for Archives and Special Collections at Ohio University Libraries.

Johnson is a recipient of Golden Quill awards in photojournalism and World Press Photo Awards in 1985, 1988 and 1992. In 2013 she was selected by her peers to win the National Geographic Photographer's Photographer award. In 2019 she was awarded the National Geographic's Eliza Scidmore Award for Outstanding Science Media, highlighting scientifically rigorous storytelling related to environmental and conservation issues.

Since 2013, Johnson has been a visiting professional at Syracuse University in the multimedia photography and design department (MPD). In 2018 Johnson, along with other photographers of Documentary Works, had work exhibited at The Westmoreland Museum of Art titled "Emigration-Immigration-Migration."

== Notable works ==
Winner, Robert F. Kennedy Journalism Award for Coverage of the Disadvantaged, 1985

Finalist, Pulitzer for Explanatory Reporting to National Geographic Magazine's Gender Revolution issue, 2017

Finalist, 2019 Pulitzer Prize in Feature Photography with Maggie Steber for National Geographic, "For a compelling, dignified photo narrative that provides an intimate look at the youngest face transplant recipient in the U.S."

Her work has appeared in the following books:

- Women of Vision: National Geographic’s Female Photographers, 2013
- Through the Lens: National Geographic Greatest Photographs, 2003
- Edward Curtis: Coming to Light, 2002
- John Muir: Nature’s Visionary, 2001
- Nature’s Medicines: Plants that Heal, 2000
- Women Photographers at National Geographic, 2000
- Women in the Material World, 1996
- Power to Heal, 1990
- Men’s Lives, 1984
