= Breadalbane (ship) =

British barque crushed by ice in 1853

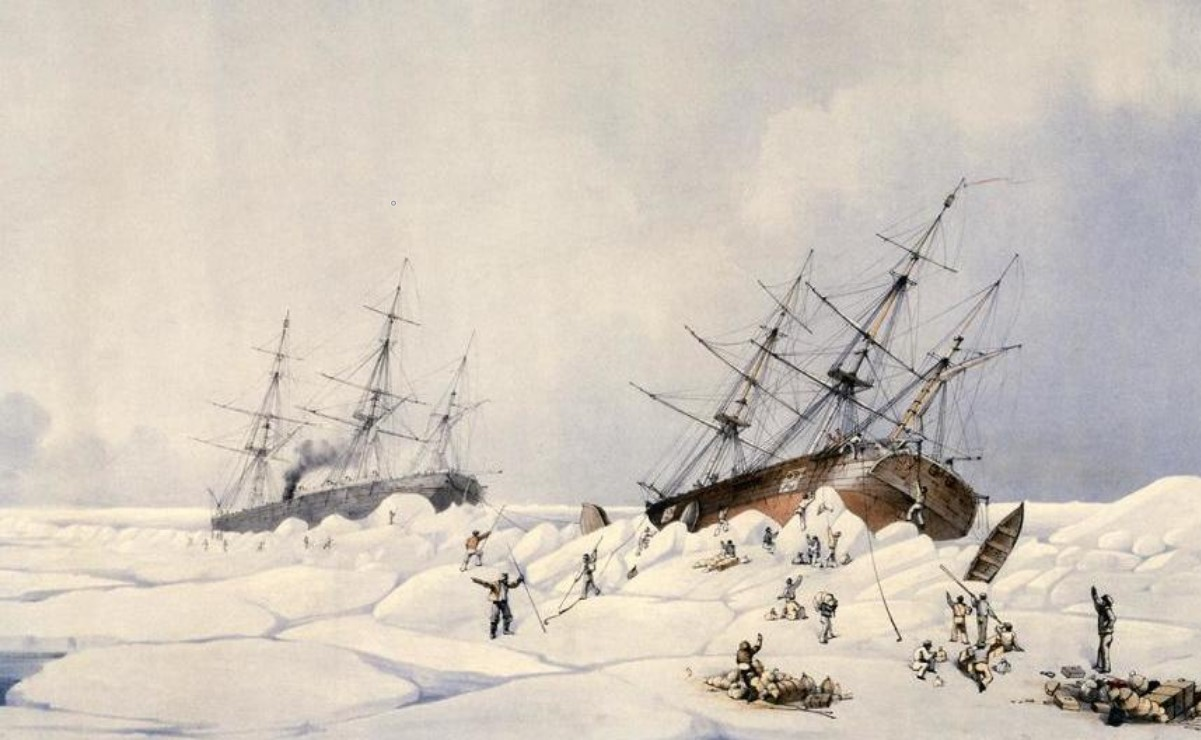
- Breadalbane (right) and Phoenix off Beechey Island, Canada, by Edward Augustus Inglefield

History

United Kingdom
- Name: Breadalbane
- Namesake: Breadalbane, Scotland
- Operator: McNeil & Co.
- Builder: Hedderwich & Rowan
- Launched: 1843
- Crushed by ice: 21 August 1853

General characteristics
- Type: Merchant ship
- Tons burthen: 428 bm
- Length: 38.1 metres (125 feet)
- Beam: 7.3 metres (24 feet)
- Depth of hold: 5.5 metres (18 feet)
- Sail plan: Barque

Breadalbane was an 1843 British three-masted merchant barque that was crushed by ice and sank in the Arctic in 1853. Notable as one of the northernmost shipwrecks known, she is also considered one of the best-preserved wooden ships ever found in the sea due to slow deterioration in the cold Arctic water. Historically, Breadalbane is considered to be a time capsule.

On 21 August 1853, she became trapped by an ice floe and was crushed. She sank to the bottom of the Northwest Passage near Beechey Island in Lancaster Sound, approximately 500 miles (800 km) north of the Arctic Circle. Her entire crew of 21 abandoned ship in time and were rescued by her companion, HMS Phoenix.

In August 1980, the wreck was discovered by a five-man team led by Joe MacInnis working from the Canadian Coast Guard icebreaker Sir John A. McDonald. Three years later it was designated a national historic site of Canada because the ship was used in the search for John Franklin's lost expedition.

== Characteristics ==
Breadalbane was built by Hedderwich & Rowan for a Scottish merchant consortium in a shipyard on the Clyde River, in Scotland in 1843. She was named after Breadalbane, a region of the Scottish Highlands. The ship was originally used to transport wine, wool and grain to Europe, and spent her first ten years sailing between England and Calcutta carrying various goods.

Breadalbane was a 428-ton, wooden square-rigged sailing ship. The design was similar to hundreds of other trans-oceanic ships used in early Victorian times. She was 38.1 metres (125 ft) long, with a beam of 7.3 metres (24 ft) and a hold depth of 5.5 metres (18 ft).

== Arctic service ==
In the spring of 1853, the Royal Navy called the ship into service to transport coal and other supplies to the North Star, a depot ship. She left the Thames River in 1853, accompanied by HMS Phoenix (one of the first screw propulsion ships in the Arctic), and arrived at a rallying point at Beechey Island later that year.

Her new mission would be to carry supplies to Sir Edward Belcher's high Arctic search expedition in the Resolute Bay area (now part of Nunavut). Since 1852, Belcher's expedition had been searching for the Franklin Expedition. The ship and crew had gone missing while searching for a passage through the Arctic seas. Belcher's expedition was both the largest, and the last sent by the Royal Navy.

=== Trapped in ice ===
On 21 August 1853, Breadalbane was anchored to an ice floe half a mile south of Beechey Island in Lancaster Sound, approximately 500 miles north of the Arctic Circle. It had become surrounded by slow-moving ice. Shortly after midnight, a slab of ice penetrated the starboard bow.

About ten minutes past four a.m., the ice passing the ship awoke me, and the door of my cabin from the pressure opened: I immediately hurriedly put on my clothes, and on getting up found some hands on the ice, endeavouring to save the boats, but they were instantly crushed to pieces; they little thought, when using their efforts to save the boats, that the Breadalbane was in so perilous a situation. I went forward to hail the Phoenix, for men to save the boats, and whilst doing so, the ropes by which we were secured parted, and a heavy nip took the ship making every timber in her creak, and the ship tremble all over. I looked in the main hold, and saw the beams given away; I hailed those on the ice and told them of our critical situation, they not for one moment suspecting it. I then rushed to my cabin, hauled out my portmanteau on the deck, and roared like a bull to those in their beds to jump out and save their lives. The startling effects on them might be more easily imagined than described. On reaching the deck those on the ice called out to me to jump over the side, that the ship was going over.

The crew quickly salvaged as many supplies and personal items as possible. The 21-man crew then abandoned the ship. Within fifteen minutes, the vessel sank to the floor of the Barrow Strait in an approximate position of 74°41′N 91°50′W. The crew was rescued by HMS Phoenix.

== Shipwreck ==
The wreck of Breadalbane was first discovered in August 1980, by a team led by Joseph B. MacInnis. Two previous attempts in 1978 and 1979 failed to find any trace of the ship. Using side-scan sonar towed by CCGS John A. Macdonald, the ship was found in 100 metres (330 ft) of water one and a half kilometres (0.93 mi) south of Beechey Island. She was lying intact on the seafloor with two of her three masts still standing and her bow pointing east.

In September 1981, MacInnis, working on CCGS Pierre Radisson, led a team that used a remotely operated vehicle to collect more than 1,000 images. It was revealed a debris field with the fallen mast, the ship's copper-sheathed lower hull, and a flat-roofed deckhouse. A small cabinet on the aft end of the deckhouse held a compass and signal light. Below the cabinet was the wooden steering wheel. The ship was wrapped in soft, pink coral.

In 1983, another four crewed- and six remotely operated vehicle dives were made, during which the ship's wheel was recovered and turned over to Parks Canada for preservation and display.
