= M. Philip Kahl =

American zoologist (1934–2012)

- Born: Marvin Philip Kahl; September 28, 1934; Indianapolis, Indiana, U.S.
- Died: December 4, 2012 (aged 78); Sedona, Arizona, U.S.
- Education: Butler University (BS); Emory University; University of Georgia (MS, PhD)
- Occupation: Zoologist

Marvin Philip Kahl (September 28, 1934 – December 4, 2012) was an American zoologist who studied birds and elephants. From the 1950s to 1980s, Kahl conducted his avian research on storks, flamingos and spoonbills. During this time period, Kahl worked for various places including the National Audubon Society and Rare Animal Relief Effort. In the 1990s, Kahl switched his research to elephants and continued to study them until the 2010s.

Throughout his career, Kahl took wildlife photographs for various publications including National Geographic and the Journal of Zoology. Kahl wrote Wonders of Storks in 1978 and was a co-author of Storks, Ibises, and Spoonbills of the World in 1992. Apart from his works, Kahl received a fellowship from the National Science Foundation in the 1960s and one from the American Museum of Natural History in the 1970s. He also became part of the MacArthur Fellows Program in 1988.

== Early life and education ==
Kahl was born in Indianapolis, Indiana, on September 28, 1934. Growing up, Kahl enjoyed learning about nature when he was a child and began birdwatching while in high school. For his post-secondary education, Kahl studied botany and zoology at Butler University and received a Bachelor of Science in 1956. After Butler, Kahl went to Emory University for a biology program while serving for the United States Army. As part of the Army, he conducted research on how radioactivity impacted nature in Oak Ridge, Tennessee, and Puerto Rico. While studying psychology and zoology at the University of Georgia, Kahl received a Master of Science and Doctor of Philosophy during the 1960s.

== Career ==
In 1959, Kahl started a five-year position working for the National Audubon Society as a biologist. While with the NAS, Kahl conducted research on wood storks in the Corkscrew Swamp Sanctuary. During the remainder of the 1960s, Kahl worked for the Makerere University College in Uganda for two years before continuing his avian research outside of the college. During this time period, Kahl studied storks with a fellowship from the National Science Foundation and a grant from National Geographic.

After expanding his research to flamingos in 1964, Kahl completed his global research of every type of stork by 1970. During the early 1970s, Kahl worked for the American Museum of Natural History as a fellow before continuing his flamingo studies with an additional grant from National Geographic in 1972. From 1974 to 1977, Kahl was a member of the Rare Animal Relief Effort as a researcher. While branching out to research on spoonbills in 1979, Kahl finished his worldwide research on every type of flamingo in 1980.

From 1980 to 1989, Kahl traveled across the world to research every spoonbill breed. During this time period, Kahl was named into the MacArthur Fellows Program in 1988. With his MacArthur prize money, Kahl wanted to conduct research on the black-faced spoonbill in North Korea. After he was not allowed to enter the country, Kahl went to China to continue his spoonbill research.

At the start of the 1990s, Kahl switched his research topic from birds to the non-verbal behavior of elephants. With a focus on African elephants, Kahl went to Zimbabwe and conducted research at Hwange National Park throughout the 1990s. After completing his primary research, Kahl continued to review his findings until the 2010s. Apart from his research, Kahl wrote and took photographs about wildlife for various publications including the Journal of Zoology, National Geographic and Behaviour. Some birds that Kahl photographed included the Salvadori's teal and the sunbittern.

== Research and publications ==
After raising wood storks during the early 1960s, Kahl published Bioenergetics of Growth in Nestlings Wood Storks in 1962. In 1963, Kahl published his research of how storks lowered their body temperature with urohidrosis. That year, Kahl conducted an experiment with L. J. Peacock to determine how storks catch fish. To conduct the test, the researchers covered a wood stork's eyes with ping-pong balls that were darkened to reduce the bird's vision. After their research was concluded, Kahl and Peacock published their findings about the independent workings of the bird's feeding and sight. As an author, Kahl wrote and drew a 1978 children's book titled Wonders of Storks. As a co-writer, he was part of the 1992 publication of Storks, Ibises, and Spoonbills of the World.

== Death and personal life ==
Kahl died from a brain tumor on December 4, 2012, in Sedona, Arizona. He was married twice and had two children.
