= Farrell Grehan =

American photojournalist, travel and nature photographer

Farrell Grehan (1926 – May 6, 2008) was an American photojournalist, travel and nature photographer of the period from the 1950s to the 2000s whose work appeared in magazines and books.

== Early life ==
Born in 1926 in New York, before taking up photography, Farrell Grehan studied art at the Art Students League with Yasuo Kuniyoshi and Will Barnet, and there met Elisabeth S. Stevens (1929–2018), journalist and future art and architecture critic for The Baltimore Sun, and they married in 1959 after he had become a professional photographer in 1956. The marriage ended in divorce and in 1967 she married Robert C. Schleussner, Jr., an engineer and executive.

== Career ==
Grehan was for twelve years a contract photographer for LIFE magazine as well as photographing In the Low Countries and Switzerland for its book publishing arm Life World Library books, and was considered one of the magazine's great photographers. His pictures were published also in National Geographic, The Saturday Evening Post, Avenue, World and I, Sports Illustrated and other publications.

Farrell's career spanned from 1950s to the 2000s and he worked in locations that included Burma, Lapland, Yemen, Aran Islands, Egypt, Bethlehem, Crete, Moscow and Prague. In America he photographed Walden Pond, Allagash, the World Trade Center, Hopi Indian nation, national parks, Okefenokee Swamp Park Mackinac Island. For LIFE he documented urban renewal in New York and made photographs of architectural structures by Roberto Burle Marx and Frank Lloyd Wright that represent them in their settings, an approach he applied to his full-colour imagery of American wildflowers. He had been making floral studies as a hobby before showing them to publishers in 1959. Their response was positive, and they described his pictures as having “the delicacy of a Japanese painting. Occasionally one sees through flowers in the foreground to focus upon a blossom sharply defined. No other flower photographs have captured their subjects with such sensitivity to colour and form.” Such framing-in-depth is evident in his picture City Child which in 1953 had won a $2,000 award, and was chosen in 1955 by Edward Steichen for MoMA's world-touring The Family of Man exhibition that was seen by 9 million visitors; Grehan's camera candidly observes through broken fence palings a young girl alone and lost in her thoughts in an overgrown, neglected city garden.

Grehan's notable portrait subjects included artists Salvador Dalí, Alexander Calder, David Alfaro Siqueros, Hans Erni, Man Ray and Marcel Duchamp, the conductor Pierre Monteux, psychologist Jean Piaget, golfer Arnold Palmer, author Friedrich Dürrenmatt, industrial designer Russel Wright, and the dancers Martha Graham, Merce Cunningham and Gelsey Kirkland.

Grehan died on May 6, 2008, and was interred at Rockland Cemetery in Sparkill, NY. He was survived by his former wife Yvonne, two sons and two grandsons.

== Exhibitions ==
Grehan's works were included in six Museum of Modern Art group exhibitions;

- 1953, February 26–April 1, Always the Young Strangers, Museum of Modern Art, New York
- 1955, January 24–May 8, The Family of Man, Museum of Modern Art, New York
- 1958, November 26–January 18, 1959, Photographs from the Museum Collection, Museum of Modern Art, New York
- 1960, February 17–April 10, A Sense of Abstraction, Museum of Modern Art, New York
- 1965, March 16–May 16, The Photo Essay, Museum of Modern Art, New York
- 1968, February 9–March 31, Ben Schultz Memorial Exhibition, Museum of Modern Art, New York

== Books ==
- Grehan, Farrell; Wright, Frank Lloyd (1997), Visions of Wright (1st ed.), Little, Brown, ISBN 978-0-8212-2470-0
- Farrell Grehan; Rickett, Harold William (1964), The Odyssey book of American wildflowers, New York Odyssey Press
- Kalokyrēs, Kōnstantinos D (1973), The Byzantine wall paintings of Crete, Red Dust, ISBN 978-0-87376-023-2
- Tom Melham; Grehan, Farrell (1976), John Muir's wild America, Washington National Geographic Society, ISBN 978-0-87044-186-8
- Great rivers of the world (1st ed.), Washington, D.C National Geographic Society, 1984, ISBN 978-0-87044-539-2

== Bibliography ==
- Chapter in Loengard, John; Parks, Gordon (2004), The great Life photographers, Thames & Hudson, ISBN 978-0-500-54293-4
