= William Albert Allard =

American documentary photographer

- Born: 1937; Minneapolis, Minnesota
- Education: Minneapolis School of Fine Arts, University of Minnesota
- Known for: Documentary photography
- Awards: Outstanding Achievement Award from the University of Minnesota (1994)

William Albert Allard (born 1937) is an American documentary photographer who worked in color from 1964.

He was awarded the Outstanding Achievement Award from the University of Minnesota in 1994, the Joseph A Sprague Memorial Award from the National Press Photographers Association in 2002, the Award for Excellence from the University of Minnesota School of Journalism and Mass Communication in 2004, and the Figaro Magazine Lifetime Achievement Visa d'or Award in 2019.

== Biography ==
Allard was born in Minneapolis, Minnesota. The son of a Swedish immigrant, he studied at the Minneapolis School of Fine Arts and the University of Minnesota with the hope of becoming a writer. Transferring to the University of Minnesota after only a year, he enrolled in the journalism program. He graduated in 1964 with a double major in journalism and photography.

The same year, looking for work in photojournalism, Allard joined National Geographic in Washington, D.C. as an intern. He worked exclusively in color. His most notable work as an intern included his photographs of the Amish for an article entitled "Amish Folk: Plainest of Pennsylvania's Plain People," (published in August 1965). One of his photographs from this collection was sent aboard the Voyager 1 space probe. His work led to a full-time position with the magazine.

In 1967, after just two years, Allard resigned from his position at National Geographic, feeling that he was unable to contribute to the issues of the time, such as the Vietnam War in a way that seemed possible at other magazines such as Life Magazine. He continued to do assignments as a freelance photographer for National Geographic.

In 1982, Allard published his first book, Vanishing Breed, a photographic essay documenting the "old American west". In 1989 he published his second work, a retrospective of his work entitled The Photographic Essay. He continued to work for National Geographic, eventually taking up his second full-time position at the magazine.

== Publications ==
- Vanishing Breed: Photographs of the Cowboy and the West. Boston: Little, Brown, 1982. ISBN 978-0821215050. With a foreword by Thomas McGuane.
- The Photographic Essay. American Photographer Master Series. Bullfinch / Little, Brown, 1989. By Erla Zwingle and Russell Hart. ISBN 978-0821217351. With an introduction by Sean Callahan.
- A Time We Knew: Images of Yesterday in the Basque Homeland. University of Nevada Press, 1990. ISBN 9780874171570.
- Time at the Lake: a Minnesota Album. Duluth, MN: Pfeifer-Hamilton, 1997. ISBN 9781570251337.
- Portraits of America. Washington, D.C.: National Geographic Society, 2001. ISBN 9780792264187. With a foreword by Richard Ford.
- Five Decades: A Retrospective. Washington, D.C.: National Geographic Society, 2010. ISBN 978-1426206375. With a foreword by William Kittredge.
- Paris – Eye of the Flâneur. Lammerhuber, 2017. ISBN 978-3903101036.

== Awards ==
- 1994: Outstanding Achievement Award from the University of Minnesota
- 2002: Joseph A Sprague Memorial Award from the National Press Photographers Association
- 2004: Award for Excellence from the University of Minnesota School of Journalism and Mass Communication
- 2019: Figaro Magazine Lifetime Achievement Visa d'or Award, from Visa pour l'Image, Perpignan, France
