= Guy Mary-Rousselière =

Canadian anthropologist (1913–1994)

Father Guy Mary-Rousselière (1913, Le Mans, France – 1994, Pond Inlet, Canada) was a French anthropologist, missionary priest, and collector of string figures. He trained as a priest at the Séminaire Saint-Sulpice (fr), Issy-les-Moulineaux, and whilst there passed the exam to train also as a Sergeant in the French Army Reserve. He was ordained in 1937, his 56 years of ministry being spent in the Canadian Arctic, first with the Dené people in Saskatchewan and Manitoba, then with the Inuit of Repulse Bay (now Naujaat), Pelly, Hudson Bay, and Baffin Island. For the 36 years prior to his death, he lived in Pond Inlet (Mittimatalik).

Mary-Rousselière was involved in the recording of Inuit songs, film-making, and had photographs published occasionally in National Geographic. He excavated numerous artifacts which were given to the National Museum in Ottawa and for many years was the editor of Eskimo magazine (from 1953), as well as being a member of the Northwest Territories Historic Sites and Monuments Board.

In 1988 he received Northern Science Award, which was presented to him by the Honourable Bill McKnight, Minister of Indian Affairs and Northern Development.

== Bibliography ==
- Mary-Rousselière, Guy (1969). "Les Jeux de ficelle des Arviligjuarmiut" [String Figures of the Arviligjuarmiut] (PDF). Bulletin (in French) (233). Ottawa: Musées nationaux du Canada. ISSN 0317-638X.
- Mary-Rousselière, Guy (1980). Qitdlarssuaq, l’histoire d’une migration polaire (in French). Presses de l'Université de Montréal. ISBN 276060439X. OCLC 1132446565.
  - Mary-Rousselière, Guy (1991). Qitdlarssuaq: The Story of a Polar Migration. Translated by Cooke, Alan. Winnipeg: Wuerz Publishing. ISBN 092006339X.
  - (2008) Qitdlarssuaq, l’histoire d’une migration polaire. Réédition, éditions Paulsen, Paris, ISBN 9782916552163.

== Filmography ==
- . Light in the Darkness.
