= Joel Achenbach =

American staff writer (born 1960)

- Born: Joel Leroy Achenbach; December 31, 1960 (age 65); Gainesville, Florida, U.S.
- Education: Princeton University (AB)
- Occupations: Journalist, author
- Children: 3
- Writing career
- Language: English
- Notable works: Why Things Are (1991); It Looks Like a President Only Smaller: Trailing Campaign 2000 (2001); Captured by Aliens: The Search for Life and Truth in a Very Large Universe (2003); The Grand Idea: George Washington's Potomac and the Race to the West (2005); A Hole at the Bottom of the Sea: The Race to Kill the BP Oil Gusher (2011)
- Notable awards: Philip J. Klass Award by National Capital Area Skeptics (NCAS) in 2011

Joel LeRoy Achenbach (/ˈɑːkənbɑːk/; born December 31, 1960) is an American journalist who was a reporter at The Washington Post for 35 years until he retired in August 2025. He has since written for Slate and The Atlantic. He is the author of seven books, including A Hole at the Bottom of the Sea, The Grand Idea, Captured by Aliens, It Looks Like a President only Smaller, and three compilations of his former syndicated newspaper column "Why Things Are." He is a contributor to many publications, including Slate and National Geographic, where he is a former monthly columnist. Achenbach has been a commentator on National Public Radio's Morning Edition, and does occasional lectures and other speaking engagements. In addition to his work in the print version of The Washington Post, Achenbach was one of the first Post writers to have a significant presence on the Internet and formerly wrote the popular Post blog, "The Achenblog," which ended in March 2017.

== Background and education ==
Achenbach is a native of Gainesville, Florida. He graduated with an A.B. in politics from Princeton University in 1982 after completing a 246-page-long senior thesis titled "A Prism for Politics: The Controversy of the Diablo Canyon Nuclear Power Plant." Prior to his tenure with The Washington Post in 1990, Achenbach was a staff writer for the Miami Herald from 1982 to 1990, where he worked closely with Pulitzer Prize winners Gene Weingarten and Dave Barry. Achenbach was awarded the Philip J. Klass Award for outstanding contributions in promoting critical thinking and scientific understanding for 2011, by National Capital Area Skeptics (NCAS).

== Style and experience ==
Members of the Achenblog have described Achenbach as writing with versatility and deft humor. As a reporter and an author he has covered topics as diverse as presidential elections, George Washington, the national deficit, the war in Iraq, the search for extraterrestrial life, the space program, and climate change. In addition to scientific and analytical sophistication, Achenbach's work has been characterized by members of the Achenblog as having a strong appreciation for and sensitivity to the human aspects of his stories.

In the months after the Deepwater Horizon Disaster, Achenbach wrote and contributed to an extensive series of articles for The Washington Post that led to his most recent book, A Hole at the Bottom of the Sea.

== Misconduct allegations and suspension ==
On January 10, 2018, The Washington Post suspended Achenbach for 90 days because of what it called "inappropriate workplace conduct" involving current and former female colleagues. After the conclusion of the suspension Achenbach returned to work as a reporter for the Washington Post.

== Family life ==
Achenbach lives in Washington, DC with his wife, Mary Stapp, and their three daughters.

== Selected works ==
- Why Things Are (1991), ISBN 978-0-345-36224-7
- Why Things Are, Volume II: The Big Picture (1993), ISBN 978-0-345-37798-2
- Why Things Are and Why Things Aren't (1996), ISBN 978-0-345-39288-6
- Captured by Aliens: The Search for Life and Truth in a Very Large Universe (1999), ISBN 978-0-684-84856-3
- It Looks Like a President Only Smaller: Trailing Campaign 2000 (2001), ISBN 978-0-7432-2348-5
- The Grand Idea: George Washington's Potomac and the Race to the West (2004), ISBN 978-0-684-84857-0
- A Hole at the Bottom of the Sea: The Race to Kill the BP Oil Gusher (2011), ISBN 978-1-4516-2534-9
