= List of National Geographic cover stories (1990s) =

National Geographic logo

National Geographic is an American magazine that is noted for its cover stories and accompanying photography. Throughout the 1990s National Geographic's cover stories showcased global historical events such as the Exxon Valdez oil spill. Cover stories included articles written by notable writers such as Joel Swerdlow, Paul Theroux and Paul F. Salopek. Cover photos were published by notable photographers such as David Doubilet, James Nachtwey and Frans Lanting.

The 1990s saw articles written and photographed at locations around the globe featuring marine life like the February 1994 issue titled "Sea Turtles: In a Race for Survival", written by Anne and Jack Rudloe with a photo on the cover of a Sea turtle, photographed by Bill Curtsinger. Articles featured on the cover of the magazine also included human-interest stories such as "1491: America Before Columbus", photographed by Jack Unruh featuring the Iroquois Native Americans in the October 1991 issue. Many geographical locations were featured including Petra, an archaeological city in Jordan, in the December 1998 article "Petra: Ancient City of Stone", written by Don Belt with photographs by Annie Griffiths.

In the August 1991 issue, Thomas Y. Canby wrote the cover story titled "The Persian Gulf: After the Storm", writing about the Kuwaiti oil fires after the Persian Gulf War. The photo on the cover of the magazine featured a picture of oil fields on fire, photographed by Steve McCurry.

== 1990 ==
1990
Title^{a}	Date	Author	Photographer	Images^{b}	Ref
Alaska's Big Spill	January 1990	Bryan Hodgson	Natalie Fobes	Oil spill covering a guillemot	
Between Monterey Tides	February 1990	Rick Gore	David Doubilet	Harbor seal	
Siberia in from the Cold	March 1990	Mike Edwards	Steve Raymer	Nenet woman chopping wood	
A Personal Vision of Vanishing Life	April 1990	Staff writer^{c}	James Balog	Orangutan	
Growing up in East Harlem	May 1990	Jere Van Dyk	Joseph Rodriguez	East Harlem resident	
Austin	June 1990	Elizabeth A. Moize	Michael O'Brien	Austin teenage prom dates	
Florida Watershed	July 1990	Nicole Duplaix	Farrell Grehan	Great egret	
Yugoslavia: A House Much Divided	August 1990	Kenneth C. Danforth	Steve McCurry	Albanian family	
Track of the Manila Galleons	September 1990	Eugene Lyons	Sisse Brimberg	Chinese girl in a dress	
Suruga Bay: In the Shadow of Mount Fuji	October 1990	David Doubilet	David Doubilet	Lionfish	
The Baltic Nations	November 1990	Priit Vesilind	Larry C. Price	cleaner on Statue of Stalin	
Botswana	December 1990	Frans Lanting	Frans Lanting	Hippopotamus	

== 1991 ==
1991
Title^{a}	Date	Author	Photographer	Images^{b}	Ref
Northwest Australia: The Land & the Sea	January 1991	Harvey Arden	Sam Abell	Australian rancher family	
Hong Kong: Countdown to 1997	February 1991	Ross Terrill	Jodi Cobb	Child in refugee camp	
Lechuguilla Cave	March 1991	Tim Cahill	Michael Nichols	Lechuguilla Cave	
A Season in the Minors	April 1991	David Lamb	William Albert Allard	El Paso Diablos	
Elephants: Out of Time, Out of Space	May 1991	Douglas H. Chadwick	Frans Lanting	Elephant	
East Europe's Dark Dawn	June 1991	Jon Thompson	James Nachtwey	Romanian boys	
The Wyeth Family	July 1991	Richard Meryman	N. C. Wyeth	Treasure Island cover	
The Persian Gulf: After the Storm	August 1991	Thomas Y. Canby	Steve McCurry	Kuwaiti oil fires	
A Shameful Harvest	September 1991	Constance J. Poten	José Azel	Red fox pups	
1491: America Before Columbus	October 1991	Not stated^{d}	Jack Unruh	Iroquois leader	
Zaire River	November 1991	Robert Caputo	Robert Caputo	Young Zaire fisherman	
Ibn Battuta: Prince of Travelers	December 1991	Thomas A. Abercrombie	James L. Stanfield	Veiled Islamic woman	

== 1992 ==
1992
Title^{a}	Date	Author	Photographer	Images^{b}	Ref
Search for Columbus	January 1992	Eugene Lyon	Bob Sacha	Niña; Pinta; Santa María	
Bittersweet Success: Eastern Wildlife	February 1992	James Conaway	Raymond Gehman	Geese; World Trade Center	
A Curious Kinship: Apes and Humans	March 1992	Eugene Linden	Michael Nichols	Frodo (Chimpanzee)	
Good Luck City: Vancouver	April 1992	Andrew Ward	Annie Griffiths Belt	Beluga whale in aquarium	
India's Wildlife Dilemma	May 1992	Geoffrey C. Ward	Raghu Rai	Tiger	
Russia's Baikal: The World's Great Lake	June 1992	Don Belt	Sarah Leen	Russian child sledding on Lake Baikal	
Mountain Lions	July 1992	Maurice G. Hornocker	Jim Dutcher	Mountain Lion cub	
Struggle of the Kurds	August 1992	Christopher Hitchens	Ed Kashi	Kurd woman	
Dolphins in Crisis	September 1992	Kenneth S. Norris	Flip Nicklin	Spotted dolphins	
Our Disappearing Wetlands	October 1992	John G. Mitchell	Mark Wilson	American bullfrog	
The Sense of Sight	November 1992	Michael E. Long	Joe McNally	Human eye	
Crucibles of Creation: Volcanoes	December 1992	Noel Grove	Roger Ressmeyer	Kīlauea volcano	

== 1993 ==
1993
Title^{a}	Date	Author	Photographer	Images^{b}	Ref
Dinosaurs	January 1993	Rick Gore	John Gurche	Saurolophus	
Newborn Panda in the Wild	February 1993	Lu Zhi	Lu Zhi	Giant panda cub	
A Broken Empire	March 1993	Mike Edwards	Gerd Ludwig	Stalin statue blindfolded	
Andrew Aftermath	April 1993	Rick Gore	Joel Sartore	Hurricane Andrew soldier with boy	
Middle East Water: Critical Resource	May 1993	Priit J. Vesilind	Ed Kashi	Egyptian woman drinking in; Nile	
Hanging in the Balance: Chesapeake Bay	June 1993	Tom Horton	Robert W. Madden	Chesapeake Bay boy leaping on dock	
Lightning: Natures High Voltage Spectacle	July 1993	William R. Newcott	Thomas Ives	Lightning	
Tragedy Strikes the Horn of Africa	August 1993	Robert Caputo	Robert Caputo	Somali woman with pale	
India's Rabari	September 1993	Robyn Davidson	Dilip Mehta	Indian child with camel	
Labrador	October 1993	Robert M. Poole	Richard Olsenius	Canadian boy smiling	
The Red Sea	November 1993	David Doubilet	David Doubilet	Emperor angelfish	
Glass: Capturing the Dance of Light	December 1993	William S. Ellis	James L. Amos	Glass with gold sparkles	

== 1994 ==
1994
Title^{a}	Date	Author	Photographer	Images^{b}	Ref
Macaws	January 1994	Charles A. Munn	Frans Lanting	Macaw bird eating fruit	
Sea Turtles: In a Race for Survival	February 1994	Anne and Jack Rudloe	Bill Curtsinger	Sea turtle swimming	
Shanghai	March 1994	William S. Ellis	Stuart Franklin	Shanghai bicyclists	
The Everglades: Dying for Help	April 1994	Alan Mairson	Chris Johns	Newborn alligators	
Turkey	May 1994	Thomas B. Allen	Reza	Turkish woman dancing	
Powwow	June 1994	Michael Parfit	David Alan Harvey	Native American family	
Recycling	July 1994	Noel Grove	Jose Azel	Recycling mill with worker	
Lions of Darkness	August 1994	Dereck Joubert	Beverly Joubert	Lion with killed Zebra	
Ireland	September 1994	Richard Conniff	Sam Abell	Irish children with horse	
Our National Parks	October 1994	John G. Mitchell	Kurt E. Smith	Mount Rainier National Park	
Buffalo: Back Home on the Range	November 1994	Bryan Hodgson	Sarah Leen	Bisons at Yellowstone	
Animals at Play	December 1994	Stuart L. Brown	Mitsuaki Iwagō	Japanese macaque	

== 1995 ==
1995
Title^{a}	Date	Author	Photographer	Images^{b}	Ref
Grey Reef Sharks	January 1995	Bill Curtsinger	Bill Curtsinger	Grey reef shark	
Maya Masterpiece Revealed at Bonampak	February 1995	Mary Miller	Doug Stern; Enrico Feroelli	Maya art	
Dead or Alive: The Endangered Species Act	March 1995	Douglas H. Chadwick	Joel Sartore	Red wolf pup in net	
The New Saigon	April 1995	Tracy Dahlby	Karen Kasmauski	Vietnamese bride to be	
The Vimy Flies Again	May 1995	Peter McMillan	James L. Stanfield	Biplane; Taj Mahal	
Quiet Miracles of the Brain	June 1995	Joel Swerdlow	Joe McNally	Human brain	
Ndoki: Last Place on Earth	July 1995	Douglas Chadwick	Michael Nichols	African forest elephant	
Sicily	August 1995	Jane Vessels	Robert Albert Ward	Sicilian actress	
Hawaii's Vanishing Species	September 1995	Elizabeth Royte	Chis Johns	ʻIʻiwi bird	
Threatened by War	October 1995	Paul F. Salopek	Michael Nichols	Mountain gorilla	
Diminishing Returns	November 1995	Michael Parfit	Robb Kendrick	Skipjack tuna	
Jane Goodall	December 1995	Peter Miller	Michael Nichols	Jane Goodall; Gregoire	

== 1996 ==
1996
Title^{a}	Date	Author	Photographer	Images^{b}	Ref
Neandertals	January 1996	Rick Gore	Kenneth Garrett	Neandertal skull	
Into the Heart of Glaciers	February 1996	Not stated^{c}	Carsten Peter	Greenland glacier	
Emperors of the Ice	March 1996	Glen Oeland	Frans Lanting	Emperor penguins	
Storming the Tower	April 1996	Alan Mairson	Bill Hatcher	Mountaineer; Trango Tower	
Dinosaur Eggs	May 1996	Philip J. Currie	Louie Psihoyos	Dinosaur egg	
Australia's Cape York Peninsula	June 1996	Cathy Newman	Sam Abell	Aboriginal Australian	
A Place for Parks in the New South Africa	July 1996	Douglas H. Chadwick	Chris Johns	Mother Leopard and cub	
Emerging Mexico	August 1996	Not stated^{c}	Tomasz Tomaszewski	Mexican worshipers	
Hawk High Over Four Corners	September 1996	T. H. Watkins	Adriel Heisey	Monument Valley	
African Gold	October 1996	Carol Beckwith; Angela Fisher	Carol Beckwith	African woman wearing Jewellery	
The Astronomer's' View of Home: Orbit	November 1996	Jay Apt	NASA	Space Shuttle Discovery; Earth	
Genghis Khan	December 1996	Mike Edwards	James L. Stanfield	Bronze Plaque of Genghis Khan	

== 1997 ==
1997
Title^{a}	Date	Author	Photographer	Images^{b}	Ref
Beneath the Tasman Sea	January 1997	David Doubilet	David Doubilet	Sawshark	
Siberian Tigers	February 1997	Mike Edwards	Mark Moritsch	Siberian tiger	
Bearded Seals	March 1997	Kit Kovacs	Flip Nicklin	Bearded seal	
Hubble's Eye on the Universe	April 1997	William R. Newcott	Raghvendra Sahai; John Trauger	Dying sun	
India Turning Fifty	May 1997	Geoffrey C. Ward	Steve McCurry	Indian woman	
French Polynesia	June 1997	Peter Benchley	David Doubilet	Tahitian woman	
Robot Revolution	July 1997	Curt Suplee	George Steinman	Robot	
Malaysia's Secret Realm	August 1997	Mattias Klum	Mattias Klum	Silvered leaf monkey	
China's Three Gorges	September 1997	Arthur Zich	Bob Sacha	Chinese boatman	
Zambezi	October 1997	Paul Theroux	Chris Johns	Luvale children drumming	
North Woods Journal	November 1997	Jim Brandenburg	Jim Brandenburg	Mallard ducks	
Wild Tigers	December 1997	Geoffrey C. Ward	Michael Nichols	Tigress and her cub	

== 1998 ==
1998
Title^{a}	Date	Author	Photographer	Images^{b}	Ref
Making Sense of the Millennium	January 1998	Joel Swerdlow	George Steinmetz	Sahara Desert	
Queen Maud Land	February 1998	Jon Krakauer	Gordon Wiltsie	Kubus Mountain	
Planet of the Beatles	March 1998	Douglas H. Chadwick	Mark W. Moffett	Longhorn beetle	
The Vanishing Prairie dog	April 1998	Michael E. Long	Raymound Gehman	Prairie dog	
Unlocking the Climate Puzzle	May 1998	Curt Suplee	Joanna B. Pinneo	Tuareg family in the shade	
Trans-Siberian Railroad	June 1998	Fen Montaigne	Gerd Ludwig	Russian man	
Dinosaurs Take Wings	July 1998	Jennifer Ackerman	O. Louis Mazzatenta	Feathered dinosaur	
Return to Mars	August 1998	William R. Newcott	NASA	Sojourner (rover)	
Valley of the Kings	September 1998	Kent R. Weeks	Kenneth Garrett	King Tut Alabaster	
Population	October 1998	Joel L. Swerdlow	Karen Kasmauski	Bangladesh mother and child	
Maui's Monster Waves: Jaws	November 1998	Joel Achenbach	Patrick McFeeley	Laird Hamilton surfing	
Petra: Ancient City of Stone	December 1998	Don Belt	Annie Griffiths Belt	Petra	

== 1999 ==
1999
Title^{a}	Date	Author	Photographer	Images^{b}	Ref
Coral Eden	January 1999	David Doubilet	David Doubilet	Goby; Giant clam	
Biodiversity: The Fragile Web	February 1999	Joel L. Swerdlow	Frans Lanting	Australian Spadefoot frog	
El Niño/La Niña	March 1999	Curt Suplee	NASA	Hurricane Linda	
Return to the Battle of Midway	April 1999	Thomas B. Allen	David Doubilet	World War II planes	
Africa's Wild Dogs	May 1999	Richard Conniff	Chris Johns	African wild dogs	
Cuba	June 1999	John J. Putman	Alan Harvey	Cuban boy in car	
Iran: Testing the Waters of Reform	July 1999	Fen Montaigne	Alexandra Avakian	Iranian woman	
Global Culture	August 1999	Joel L. Swerdlow	Joe McNally	Fashion Model and her mother in India	
Around at Last	September 1999	Bertrand Piccard	Breitling SA	Breitling Orbiter 3	
Secrets of the Gene	October 1999	James Shreeve	Karen Kasmauski	Genetically engineered pig	
Inca Sacrifice	November 1999	Johan Reinhard	Maria Stenzel	Inca gold figurine	
Cheetahs	December 1999	Richard Conniff	Chris Johns	Cheetah and her cub	

== See also ==
- National Geographic
- National Geographic Society
- List of National Geographic cover stories

== Notes ==
a. In some issues of National Geographic, the cover story would have one title on the cover and a different title (with the same meaning) on the headline of the actual article, or the title may appear different on the table of contents. Titles represented in this list, are taken from the cover and the citation represents the title listed in the table of contents.
b. Images could also be a painting or a drawing.
c. Author not stated, usually a breakout article or a pictorial
d. Multiple articles with various authors. Photo depicted is not included in those articles.
