= List of National Geographic cover stories (1980s) =

National Geographic logo

National Geographic is an American magazine that is noted for its cover stories and accompanying photography. Throughout the 1980s National Geographic's cover stories showcased historical events such as the 1980 eruption of Mount St. Helens and the effects of the weather phenomenon known as El Niño. Cover stories included articles written by notable writers such as Peter Benchley, Gilbert M. Grosvenor and Rick Gore. Cover photos were published by notable photographers such as Emory Kristof, Bill Curtsinger and David Alan Harvey.

The 1980s saw articles written and photographed at locations around the globe featuring outer space, like the September 1983 issue titled "Satellites That Serve Us", written by Thomas Y. Canby with a photo on the cover of the Space Shuttle Challenger, photographed by NASA. Articles featured on the cover of the magazine also included human-interest stories such as "Visit to Forbidden Tibet", written and photographed by Fred Ward featuring a Tibetan Shepherdess in the February 1980 issue. Many geographical locations were featured including the Atlantic Ocean and the discovery of the Titanic in the December 1985 article "How We Found Titanic", written and photographed by Robert Ballard.

In the June 1985 issue, Debra Denker wrote the cover story titled "Along Afghanistan's War-torn Frontier", writing about the Soviet and Afghanistan war. The photo on the cover of the magazine featured a picture of a Green-eyed Afghanistan girl (Sharbat Gula) photographed by Steve McCurry. This cover image is National Geographic's most recognized photo.

== 1980 ==
1980
Title^{a}	Date	Author	Photographer	Images^{b}	Ref
Voyager Views Jupiter's Dazzling Realm	January 1980	Rick Gore	NASA	Jupiter	
Visit to Forbidden Tibet	February 1980	Fred Ward	Fred Ward	Tibetan woman Shepherdess	
Journey to China's Far West	March 1980	Rick Gore	Bruce Dale	Chinese elder man	
Unexpected Glory in Canada's Cold Seas	April 1980	Larry Kohl	David Doubilet	Sea anemone off British Columbia	
Cheetahs of the Serengeti	May 1980	George W. and Lori Herbison	George W. and Lori Herbison^{c}	Cheetah cubs on a rock	
Living With Orangutans	June 1980	Birutė M.F. Galdikas	Rod Brindamour	Baby Orangutan with toddler in a tub	
Ancient Bulgaria's Golden Treasures	July 1980	Colin Renfrew	James L. Stanfield	Silver horse statue	
Man's 80 Centuries in Veracruz	August 1980	S. Jeffrey K. Wilkerson	David Hiser	Niches Pyramid	
Saudi Arabia: The Kingdom and Its Power	September 1980	Robert Azzi	Robert Azzi	Camel race	
Bamboo, The Giant Grass	October 1980	Luis Marden	Jim Brandenburg	Bamboo swords in China	
Windsor Castle	November 1980	Anthony Holden	James L. Stanfield	Windsor Castle with horses	
The Aztecs	December 1980	Bart Dowell	David Hiser	Obsidian knife	

== 1981 ==
1981
Title^{a}	Date	Author	Photographer	Images^{b}	Ref
Mount St. Helens	January 1981	Not stated^{d}	Douglas Miller	A house in front of Mount St. Helens	
Where Oil and Wildlife Mix	February 1981	Stephen C. Wilson; Karen C. Hayden	Stephen C. Wilson^{c}; Karen C. Hayden^{c}	Whooping crane	
When the Space Shuttle Finally Flies	March 1981	Rick Gore	Jon Schneeberger	Space Shuttle	
Ireland: Its Long Trevail	April 1981	Joseph Judge	Cotton Coulson	Irish stone maze	
Jawbreaker for Sharks	May 1981	Valerie Taylor	Ron Taylor	Blue shark biting Valeire Taylor's arm	
The Dispossessed	June 1981	Larry Kohl	Kevin Fleming	Somali child; with a Goat	
Saturn: Riddles of the Rings	July 1981	Rick Gore	NASA	Saturn	
Maya Art Discovered in Cave	August 1981	George E. Stuart	Wilbur E. Garrett	Maya cave site	
Troubled Odyssey of Vietnamese Fisherman	September 1981	Harvey Arden	Steve Wall	Vietnamese girl	
Columbia: Our Phenomenal First Flight	October 1981	John W. Young; Robert Crippen	Jon Schneeberger	Space Shuttle	
The Natural World of Aldo Leopold	November 1981	Boyd Gibbons	Jim Brandenburg	Deer drinking	
Panda's in the Wild	December 1981	George B. Schaller	George B. Schaller	Panda bear	

== 1982 ==
1982
Title^{a}	Date	Author	Photographer	Images^{b}	Ref
Two Berlins	January 1982	Priit J. Vesilind	Cotton Coulson	East Berlin soldier	
Napoleon	February 1982	John J. Putnam	Gordon W. Gahan	Giza Plateau	
Sudan: Arab-African Giant	March 1982	Robert Caputo	Robert Caputo	Sudan woman with boulder on head	
The Face and Faith of Poland	April 1982	Not stated^{e}	Not stated^{e}	Polish Coal miner	
The Temples of Angkor	May 1982	Peter T. White	David Alan Harvey	Angkor temple	
Namibia: Nearly a Nation?	June 1982	Bryan Hodgson	Des and Jen Bartlett^{c}	Ostrich with chick	
In the Wake of Sinbad	July 1982	Tim Severin	Richard Greenhill	Boom (ship)	
Papua New Guinea: Journey Through Time	August 1982	François Leydet	David Austin	New Guinea tribesman	
The Bahamas: Boom times and Buccaneering	September 1982	Peter Benchley	Bruce Dale	Woman diving off of a Sailboat	
The Chip: Electronic Mini Marvel That is Changing Your Life	October 1982	Allen A. Boraiko	Charles O'Rear	Microchip in the palm of a hand	
Pueblo Pottery	November 1982	David L. Arnold	Jerry D. Jacka	Clay pottery	
Family Life of Lions	December 1982	Des and Jen Bartlett	Jen Bartlett	Lioness and her cub	

== 1983 ==
1983
Title^{a}	Date	Author	Photographer	Images^{b}	Ref
Rainforests: Teaming Life of a Rainforest	January 1983	Carol and David Hughes	Carol and David Hughes^{c}	Poison arrow frog	
Peoples of the Arctic	February 1983	David Hiser	Alan Harvey	Iñupiat child	
Ghosts Ships of the War of 1812	March 1983	Daniel A. Nelson	Emory Kristof	Hamilton–Scourge	
The Fascinating World of Trash	April 1983	Peter T. White	Louie Psihoyos	Art from trash	
A Century Old, The Wonderful Brooklyn Bridge	May 1983	John G. Morris	Frank Leslie's Illustrated Newspaper	Brooklyn Bridge	
The Once and Future Universe	June 1983	Rick Gore	David Malin	Horsehead Nebula	
Exploring a 140-Year-Old Ship Under the Arctic Ice	July 1983	Joseph B. MacInnis	Emory Kristof	WASP diving suit	
The Bird Men	August 1983	Luis Marden	Charles O'Rear	Ultralight	
Satellites That Serve Us	September 1983	Thomas Y. Canby	NASA	Space Shuttle Challenger	
Niger's Wodaabe: "People of the Taboo"	October 1983	Carol Beckwith	Carol Beckwith	Wodaabe man	
The Last Supper: Restoration Reveals Leonardo's Masterpiece	November 1983	Carlo Bertelli	O. Louis Mazzatenta	The Last Supper	
Byzantine Empire: Rome of the East	December 1983	Merle Severy	James L. Stanfield	Madonna art	

== 1984 ==
1984
Title^{a}	Date	Author	Photographer	Images^{b}	Ref
Southeast Alaska: An Incredible Feasting of Whales	January 1984	Al Giddings	Al Giddings	Humpback whale	
El Niño: Global Weather Disaster	February 1984	Thomas Y. Canby	Thomas Nebbia	Elephants at a water hole in Africa with researchers	
Laser: "A Splendid Light" For Man's Use	March 1984	Allen A. Boraiko	Charles O'Rear	3D Holography	
Hunting the Greenland Narwhal	April 1984	Ivars Stills	Ivars Stills	Dog sled team	
The Dead Do Tell Tales at Vesuvius	May 1984	Rick Gore	O. Luis Mazzatenta	Herculaneum skeleton	
Pakistan to Bangladesh: India By Rail	June 1984	Paul Theroux	Steve McCurry	Train in front of Taj Mahal	
Escape From Slavery: Underground Railroad	July 1984	Charles L. Blockson	Jerry Pinkney	Harriet Tubman	
Mexico City: An Alarming Giant	August 1984	Bart McDowell	Stephanie Maze	Mexican pilgrims	
Man and Manatee	September 1984	Alice J. Hall	Fred Bravendam	Manatee with diver	
Pollen: Breath of Life and Sneezes	October 1984	Cathy Newman	Martha Cooper	Bubble helmet	
Chocolate: Food of the Gods	November 1984	Gordon Young	James Stanfield	man with Chocolate Statue of Liberty	
Monsoons: Life Breath of Half the World	December 1984	Priit J. Visilind	Steve McCurry	Monsoon survivor man with sewing machine	

== 1985 ==
1985
Title^{a}	Date	Author	Photographer	Images^{b}	Ref
Koko's Kitten	January 1985	Jane Vessels	Ronald H. Cohn	Koko the Gorilla with kitten	
Greenland's 500-Year-Old Mummies	February 1985	Jens P. Hart Hanson; Jørgen Meldgaard; Jørgen Nordqvist	John Lee	Qilakitsoq child mummy	
Hazardous Waste: Storing Up Trouble	March 1985	Allen A. Boraiko	Fred Ward	Man in Hazmat suit	
When the Moguls Ruled	April 1985	Mike Edwards	Roland Michaud	Woman playing a Sitar, India	
Vietnam Memorial: To Heal a Nation	May 1985	Joel Swerdlow	Nick Sebastian	man placing flower at Vietnam Memorial	
Along Afghanistan's War-torn Frontier	June 1985	Debra Denker	Steve McCurry	Afghan Girl	
16th-Century Basque Whaling in America	July 1985	Robert Grenier; James A. Tuck	16th-Century Shipwreck with diver	Bill Curtsinger	
Our Restless Planet Earth	August 1985	Rick Gore	David Robert Austin	Jillaroo resting her horse	
Sichuan: China Changes Course	September 1985	Ross Terrill	Cary Wolinsky	Chinese couple holding a pig	
Arabia's Frankincense Trail	October 1985	Thomas Abercrombie	Lynn Abercrombie	Dye Motif on a woman's hand	
The Search For Early Man	November 1985	Richard Leakey; Alan Walker	American Bank Note Company	Fossil skull hologram	
How We Found Titanic	December 1985	Robert Ballard	Robert Ballard	RMS Titanic	

== 1986 ==
1986
Title^{a}	Date	Author	Photographer	Images^{b}	Ref
C.M. Russell: Cowboy Artist	January 1986	Bart McDowell	MacKay Collection	C.M. Russell watercolor	
Dilemma of Independence for South Africa's Ndebele	February 1986	David Jeffery	Peter Magubane	South African woman	
Secrets of the Giant Panda	March 1986	George B. Schaller	George B. Schaller	Zhen Zhen (panda)	
Río Azul: Lost City of the Mayah	April 1986	Richard E. W. Adams	William H. Bond	Río Azul	
The Serengeti: A Portfolio	May 1986	Mitsuaki Iwagō	Mitsuaki Iwagō	Lioness and her cub	
Tracking the Snow Leopard	June 1986	Rodney Jackson; Darla Hillard	Not stated^{f}	Snow Leopard	
Liberty: Her Lamp Relit	July 1986	Alice J. Hall	Robert Sacha	Statue of Liberty	
Oregon Trail: The Itch To Move West	August 1986	Boyd Gibbons	Denver Public Library	Settlers	
North to the Pole	September 1986	Will Steger	Jim Brandenburg	Dogsled explorer	
Soviets in Space	October 1986	Thomas Y. Canby	TASS	Leonid Kizim	
Our Search For the True Columbus Landfall	November 1986	Joseph Judge	Courtesy of British Library	1493 Italian Woodcut	
A Long Last Look at Titanic	December 1986	Robert D. Ballard	Woods Hole Oceanographic Institution	RMS Titanic	

== 1987 ==
1987
Title^{a}	Date	Author	Photographer	Images^{b}	Ref
Medicine's New Vision	January 1987	Howard Sochurek	Howard Sochurek	CT scan of a Tumor	
Iceland: Life Under the Glaciers	February 1987	Louise E. Levathes	Bob Krist	Icelandic girl Ingibjörg Björnsdóttir.	
North Dakota: Tough Times on the Prairie	March 1987	Bryan Hodgson	Annie Griffiths	Cropduster; Sunflowers; with plane	
Seals and their Kin	April 1987	Roger L. Gentry	Marty Sniderman	Anchovies; Sea lions	
At Home With the Arctic Wolf	May 1987	L. David Mech	Jim Brandenburg	Arctic Wolf	
The Patowmack Canal: Waterway That Led to the Constitution	June 1987	Author	Kenneth Garrett	A Bateau on the Patowmack Canal	
The Prodigious Soybean	July 1987	Fred Hapgood	Chris Johns (photographer)	Woman eating a soybean, Japan	
Africa's Stricken Sahel	August 1987	William S. Ellis	Steve McCurry	Sahel child crying	
Jade: Stone of Heaven	September 1987	Fred Ward	Fred Ward	Mayan mask	
Woman of Arabia	October 1987	Marianne Alireza	Jodi Cobb	Saudi mother and child on swing	
Süleyman the Magnificent	November 1987	Merle Severy	James L. Stanfield	Nomadic child with hand	
Oldest Known Shipwreck	December 1987	George F. Bass	Bill Curtsinger	Bronze Age Merchant ship	

== 1988 ==
1988
Title^{a}	Date	Author	Photographer	Images^{b}	Ref
One Hundred Years of Increasing and Diffusing Geographic Knowledge	January 1988	William H. Goetzmann	Not stated^{g}	Photomontage	
Australia: A Bicentennial Down Under	February 1988	Not stated^{e}	Michael O'Brien	Australian father and son	
Hello Anchorage, Goodbye Dream	March 1988	Larry L. King	Chris Johns	Windsurfing near Icebergs	
Ghosts of War	April 1988	Peter Benchley	David Doubilet	Japanese biplane underwater	
Wool: Fabric of History	May 1988	Nina Hyde	Cary Wolinsky	Shepherd wearing wool	
Guatemala: A Fragile Democracy	June 1988	Griffin Smith Jr.	James Nachtwey	Devout men of Antigua	
When the Moors Ruled Spain	July 1988	Thomas J. Abercrombie	Bruno Barbey	Moroccan woman	
Lemurs: On the Edge of Survival	August 1988	Alison Jolly	Frans Lanting	Lemurs	
100 Years: Reporting on "The world and all that is in it"	September 1988	Not stated^{d}	Not stated^{h}	Graphic lettering	
The Peopling of the Earth	October 1988	Staff writer^{i}	Alexander Marshack	Carving on Mammoth tusk	
Exploring the Earth	November 1988	William E. Garrett	Éric Valli	Nepalis Honey hunter	
Can Man Save This Fragile Earth?	December 1988	Gilbert M. Grosvenor	American Bank; Note Holographics	3D hologram of an Earth	

== 1989 ==
1989
Title^{a}	Date	Author	Photographer	Images^{b}	Ref
Ballet with Stingrays	January 1989	David Doubilet	David Doubilet	woman with Stingrays	
The Great Yellowstone Fires	February 1989	David Jeffery	Stephen Dowell	Yellowstone fires of 1988	
Faulkner's Mississippi	March 1989	William Albert Allard	William Albert Allard	Woman depicting A Rose for Emily	
Cry of the Loon	April 1989	Judith W. McIntyre	Michael S. Quinton	Loon	
The Baltic	May 1989	Priit Vesilind	Cotton Coulson	Kirov Ballet	
The March Towards Extinction	June 1989	Rick Gore	John Gurche	Dinosaurs	
France Celebrates its Bicentennial	July 1989	Staff writer^{i}	James L. Stanfield	Fireworks above Eiffel Tower	
Elephant Talk	August 1989	Katherine Payne	Frans Lanting	Elephants	
Retracing the First Crusade	September 1989	Tim Severin	Peter Essick	Yugoslavian woman praying	
La Ruta Maya	October 1989	Wilbur E. Garrett	Kenneth Garrett	Guatemalan teenagers	
Vietnam: Hard Road to Peace	November 1989	Multiple authors^{d}	David Alan Harvey	Vietnamese girl boating	
The Sistine Restoration	December 1989	David Jeffery	Adam Woolfit	Libyan Sibyl	

== See also ==
- National Geographic
- National Geographic Society
- List of National Geographic cover stories

== Notes ==
a. In some issues of National Geographic, the cover story would have one title on the cover and a different title (with the same meaning) on the headline of the actual article, or the title may appear different on the table of contents. Titles represented in this list, are taken from the cover and the citation represents the title listed in the table of contents.
b. Images could also be a painting or a drawing.
c. Two photographers are credited, it is not stated to which one took the photo.
d. Multiple articles with various authors.
e. This article was part of a supplement that came with the magazine. The supplement is not on the National Geographic archive website.
f. Uncredited Photograph, triggered by a hidden wildlife camera.
g. Multiple uncredited photographers. Photomontage of multiple past cover images. Collages by Fred Otnes
h. No photo represented. Graphic lettering only
i. Author not stated, usually a breakout article
