= Duplaix =

Duplaix is a surname. Notable people with the surname include:

- Nicole Duplaix (born 1942), French American zoologist, ecologist, and teacher
- Vikter Duplaix (born 1983), American singer-songwriter, producer, multi-instrumentalist, and DJ
- Daphnée Duplaix (born 1976), American actress and model
