= Jim Brandenburg =

Jim Brandenburg may refer to:

- Jim Brandenburg (basketball) (1935–2023), American college basketball coach
- Jim Brandenburg (photographer) (1945–2025), American photographer
