= Michael Nichols (photographer) =

American photographer

Michael "Nick" Nichols
- Born: 1952 (age 73–74); Muscle Shoals, Alabama, US
- Education: University of North Alabama
- Occupation: Photojournalist
- Years active: 1979–2015
- Known for: Editor-at-large for photography, National Geographic, 2008–15
- Spouse: Reba Peck
- Awards: Wildlife Photographer of the Year (2014)

Michael "Nick" Nichols (born 1952) is an American journalist, photographer and a founder of the LOOK3 Festival of the Photograph in Charlottesville, Virginia. His biography, A Wild Life, was written by Melissa Harris and published by Aperture.

== Biography ==
Nichols was born in 1952 in Muscle Shoals, Alabama. After studying at the University of North Alabama, where he met his mentor, former Life magazine photographer Charles Moore, Nichols began his photojournalism career in 1979, working for GEO magazine. Three years later he became a member of Magnum Photos where he worked until 1995. Starting from 1989 he has published more than 30 articles for the National Geographic and the same year was in collaboration with Jane Goodall to publish a book called Brutal Kinship. During Nichols' time with National Geographic, his stories have covered subjects including old growth Redwoods, the world's remaining tigers and the emotional relationship of the elephant family. His photo Surfing Hippos was named one of Time's Most Influential Images of All Time.

Later on, he traveled to Central Africa where he met with biologist J. Michael Fay and then went to Gabon where he visited 13 national parks, including the Ndoki forest which was featured in one of the NatGeo articles and in his The Last Place on Earth book. In 2012, he traveled to Tanzania on an assignment to document the life of lions in the Serengeti.

In November 2015, it was announced that Nichols would be one of around 180 lay-offs from National Geographic in the run-up to the magazine's acquisition by Rupert Murdoch's 21st Century Fox. Having been a staff photographer there since 1996 and editor-at-large since 2008, Nichols explained in an interview that he was preparing to retire at the start of 2016, but expressed regret for other colleagues losing their jobs and that he did not understand why the staff cuts were deemed necessary.

== Publications ==
- Gorilla: Struggle for Survival in the Virungas. New York: Aperture Foundation, 1989. Photographs by Nichols, essay by George B. Schaller. ISBN 9780747503958.
- Brutal Kinship. New York: Aperture, 1999. With Jane Goodall
- The Last Place on Earth. National Geographic Society, 2005. ISBN 978-0792238799.

== Awards ==
- 2014 Wildlife Photographer of the Year, Natural History Museum, London
- Nature & Wildlife Award at the Sony World Photography Awards

== Personal life ==
Nichols lives in Sugar Hollow, Virginia, with his wife, artist Reba Peck.
