= To Heal a Nation =

1988 film by Michael Pressman

- Based on: To Heal a Nation: The Story of the Vietnam Veterans Memorial by: Jan Scruggs; Joel Swerdlow
- Screenplay by: Lionel Chetwynd
- Directed by: Michael Pressman
- Starring: Eric Roberts
- Country of origin: United States
- Original language: English

Production
- Executive producers: Lionel Chetwynd; Frank von Zerneck; Stu Samuels
- Production companies: Lionel Chetwynd Productions; Orion Television; Von Zerneck-Samuels Productions

Original release
- Network: NBC
- Release: May 29, 1988

To Heal a Nation is a 1988 drama television film that tells the true story of Jan Scruggs (played by Eric Roberts), a decorated veteran of the Vietnam War. The film was directed by Michael Pressman.

The film was made available on video on January 6, 1993.

== Premise ==
In 1979, Scruggs is working for the U.S. Department of Labor. He becomes obsessed with the dream of erecting a monument to the people who died in Vietnam.

== Cast ==
- Eric Roberts as Jan Scruggs
- Glynnis O'Connor as Becky Scruggs
- Marshall Colt as Jack Wheeler
- Scott Paulin as Bob Doubek
- Lee Purcell as Sandle
- Brock Peters as Paul Turner
- Gloria Carlin as Monica
- Jordan Charney as Spreiregen
- Tamlyn Tomita as Maya Ying Lin
- Laurence Luckinbill as Senator Bob Mathias
- Linden Chiles as Senator John Warner
- James F. Kelly as Webb
- Tom Everett as Thompson
- Alley Mills as Sue, Stone Worker
- Conrad Bachmann as H. Ross Perot
- David Wells as James Watt
- Stuart Nisbet as Phil Burton
- Laura Owens as Elisa Wheeler
- Alan Hunter as D.J.
- Ron Roy as J. Carter Brown
- J.C. Wells as General Price
- Robert Patten as Colonel
- Ed Williams as Chaplin
- Naomi Stevens as Sam's Mother At Wall
- Theresa Karanik as Nurse
- Eloy Casados
- Gary Hershberger
- John Lafayette
