= Linda Donley-Reid =

American archaeologist

- Born: Linda Lucille Wiley; July 19, 1945; Evansville, Indiana, U.S.
- Died: January 9, 2020 (age 74)
- Occupation(s): Museum curator, archaeologist, clinical psychologist

Linda Lucille Wiley Donley-Reid (July 19, 1945 – January 9, 2020) was an American museum curator, archaeologist and clinical psychologist. She was the first curator of the Kitale Museum in Kenya, when it opened in 1973.

== Early life and education ==
Linda Lucille Wiley was born in Evansville, Indiana, and graduated from Evansville Central High School in 1963. She is the daughter of Gordon Wiley and Marjorie Upchurch Wiley. She attended Indiana University, where she was a member of Alpha Gamma Delta sorority, and she earned a degree in zoology at the University of Kentucky. She completed doctoral studies at Kings College, Cambridge, with her dissertation titled "The Social Uses of Swahili Space and Objects" (1984). She changed fields, and earned a master's degree in clinical psychology at San Francisco State University in 1990.

== Career ==
Donley-Reid was an ornithological research assistant at the Smithsonian Institution after college. She was a Peace Corps volunteer and museum curator in Kenya in the early 1970s, at the Kitale Museum and the Lamu Museum. She was the first curator at the Kitale Museum when it opened in 1973, under the supervision of Richard Leakey. She worked on Swahili ethnographic exhibitions at the Hearst Museum of Anthropology in 1984, at Cambridge University in 1984, and at the University of North Carolina at Greensboro in 1999.

As an archaeologist, Donley-Reid directed excavations in Kenya, including eighteenth-century traders' houses and slave dwellings on Lamu and Pate Islands. She reconstructed Toad Hall, a 1480s Suffolk wool trader's house, in Napa, California. She was a licensed pilot, and a fellow of the Royal Geographical Society.

Donley-Reid was a professional therapist in San Francisco from 1992.

== Publications ==
Donley-Reid's articles appeared in scholarly journalist including the African Archaeological Review and Archaeological Papers of the American Anthopological Association.

- "Come Visit! A report on the new museum of Western Kenya at Kitale" (1975)
- "Life in the Swahili Town House Reveals the Symbolic Meaning of Spaces and Artefact Assemblages" (1987)
- "The power of Swahili porcelain, beads and pottery" (1990)
- "A Structuring Structure: The Swahili House" (1990, with Susan Kent)
- "Dream Interpretation and Spirits on the Kenyan Coast" (2001)
- "Figurines, Wall Murals and Daggers: Objects and Art as Emotional Support for Cognitive Development and the Fear of Death" (2014)

== Personal life ==
Linda Wiley married physician Phillip Edward Donley in 1965. He died in a plane crash in 1971. She married physician Michael J. Reid during her time at Cambridge. She died in 2020, at the age of 74.
