= Gerd Ludwig =

German-American documentary photographer and photojournalist

Gerd Ludwig (birth name Gerhard Erich Ludwig, born March 17, 1947, in Alsfeld, Hesse, Germany) is a German-American documentary photographer and photojournalist.

== Biography ==
Gerd Ludwig initially studied German literature, political science, and physical education at the University of Marburg, before leaving prematurely to travel in Scandinavia and North America, supporting himself with jobs as a bricklayer, sailor, and dishwasher. Upon his return to Germany, he studied photography with Professor Otto Steinert at the Folkwang Hochschule (Folkwang Academy, now Folkwang University of the Arts) in Essen, graduating with a degree in Photo Design from the University of Essen in 1974. He co-founded VISUM, Germany's first photographer-owned photo agency in the same year. In 1978, he moved to Hamburg and began working for major international publications and advertising agencies.

He re-located to New York City in 1984. In the early 1990s, he signed on as a contract photographer for National Geographic Magazine, focusing on environmental issues and the changes following the dissolution of the Soviet Union. His work in the region resulted in his exhibition and book, Broken Empire: After the Fall of the USSR, a ten-year retrospective published by National Geographic in 2001. His ongoing coverage of post-Soviet Russia has garnered his distinction as being the western world's foremost color photographer documenting the region.

Gerd Ludwig is a veteran of the renowned A Day in the Life book series created by David Elliot Cohen and Rick Smolan. His work has been shown in museums such as the Natural History Museum in Vienna, Austria; at festivals such as the Visa pour L'Image Perpignan; and galleries.

Major awards include the 2006 Lucie Award for International Photographer of the Year, the 2014 Dr. Erich Salomon Award (Dr. Erich Salomon Preis), dedicated to Erich Salomon, a lifetime achievement award for photojournalists given by the German Society for Photography (DGPh), and the Missouri Honor Medal for Distinguished Service in Journalism from the Missouri School of Journalism in 2015.

Based in Los Angeles, California, Gerd Ludwig continues to photograph primarily for National Geographic Magazine while working on personal projects such as Sleeping Cars and bringing back into light work from his archive, such as early color portraiture of Joseph Beuys and Friedensreich Hundertwasser.

== Chernobyl coverage and crowdfunding ==
Gerd Ludwig first photographed the aftermath of the Chernobyl disaster for National Geographic Magazine in 1993, and again in 2005. In 2011, he created a kickstarter campaign that supported his return to the Chernobyl Exclusion Zone to continue his ongoing coverage of the aftermath of the world's worst nuclear disaster to date, becoming one of the first internationally recognized documentary photographers to utilize crowdfunding for a personal project. While the campaign was still in progress, the Fukushima Daiichi nuclear disaster brought renewed attention to Chernobyl, nuclear energy issues, and his project, eventually pushing the funding to nearly 200% of its initial goal.

The images resulting from Gerd Ludwig's return trip to Chernobyl have been published and exhibited globally including at the European Bank for Reconstruction and Development (EBRD) Headquarters in London; presented at the LOOK3 Charlottesville Festival of the Photograph in Virginia (Video on YouTube); and led to the creation of his iPad app (now discontinued), The Long Shadow of Chernobyl. In 2012, the app was awarded 1st place in the National Press Photographers Association's annual Best of Photojournalism contest in the Tablet division.

In 2013, he returned to the Zone to report on the cleanup efforts and the progress of the Chernobyl New Safe Confinement. Having covered the aftermath of the Chernobyl nuclear disaster for two decades, he teamed up with Austrian publisher Edition Lammerhuber to publish The Long Shadow of Chernobyl (essay by Mikhail Gorbachev, quotes by Svetlana Alexievich). The book received international acclaim and was awarded the Photobook of the Year award by POYi in 2015.

== Sleeping Cars ==
Sleeping Cars is the result of Gerd Ludwig's ongoing personal project documenting where cars in Los Angeles reside at night— tucked into driveways, proudly displayed in front of homes, glowing under street lamps, covered with tarps or simply left bare. The vehicles rest against backgrounds of varying ambient light on the winding streets of the Hollywood Hills to the flat gridded suburbs of the Valley. Nestled in the low-lying fog of these distinctly Los Angeles neighborhoods, the vehicles begin to take on personalities of their own. The project was published as a monograph by Edition Lammerhuber in 2016, with new images posted to the Sleeping Cars Instagram.

== Quotes ==
- "A great photograph touches the soul and broadens the mind."
- "Technique and composition in photography are equivalent to grammar and syntax in prose."

== Bibliography ==
- AO TEA ROA: Island of Lost Desire. Hundertwasser in New Zealand (Albrecht Knaus Verlag, 1979)
- BROKEN EMPIRE: After the Fall of the USSR (National Geographic Society, 2001)
- RUSSLAND — Eine Weltmacht im Wandel (National Geographic Society, 2001)
- The Long Shadow of Chernobyl (Edition Lammerhuber, 2014)
- minus 2/3 (Rocky Nook, 2016)
- Sleeping Cars (Edition Lammerhuber, 2016)
- Il Flash Invisibile (Apogeo, 2017)

== Anthologies ==
- What Meets the Eye — Images of Rural Poverty (International Fund for Agricultural Development, 2003)
- In Focus: National Geographic Greatest Portraits (National Geographic Society, 2004)
- Wide Angle: National Geographic's Greatest Places (National Geographic Society, 2005)
- Witness: The World's Greatest News Photographers (Carlton Books, Ltd, 2005)
- What Matters (Sterling, 2008)
- Visions of Paradise (National Geographic Society, 2008)
- National Geographic 50 Greatest Pictures (National Geographic Society, 2011)
- Festival La Gacilly-Baden, I Love Africa, Evelyn Schlag and Gerd Ludwig Artists in Residence (Edition Lammerhuber, 2019)

== National Geographic Stories ==
- "The Putin Generation" National Geographic: December 2016
- "Museums-Magie" National Geographic Germany: December 2015
- "On a Roll" National Geographic: July 2015
- "Two Cities" National Geographic: March 2015
- "Die Stadt, die immer wird" National Geographic Germany: November 2014
- "The Nuclear Tourist" National Geographic: October 2014
- "Searching for King Arthur" National Geographic Germany: January 2014
- "Tomorrowland" National Geographic Magazine: February 2012
- "Crimea: A Jewel in Two Crowns" National Geographic Magazine: April 2011
- "Soul of Russia" National Geographic Magazine: April 2009
- "Jakob der Reiche" National Geographic Germany: March 2009
- "Moscow Never Sleeps" National Geographic Magazine: August 2008
- "Send Me to Siberia" National Geographic Magazine: June 2008
- "Vitus Bering" National Geographic Scandinavia: October 2007
- "Vitus Bering" National Geographic Germany: February 2007
- "Marktl" National Geographic Germany: May 2006
- "The Long Shadow Of Chernobyl" National Geographic: April 2006
- "Napoleon In Germany" National Geographic Germany: November 2005
- "The Salton Sea" National Geographic: February 2005
- "Nibelungen" National Geographic Germany: December 2004
- "Russia Rising" National Geographic: November 2001
- "Russlands Seele" National Geographic Germany: November 2001
- "The Brothers Grimm – Guardians of the Fairy Tale" National Geographic: December 1999
- "A Comeback for the Cossacks" National Geographic: November 1998
- "Russia's Iron Road (Trans-Siberian Railroad)" National Geographic: June 1998
- "Moscow. The New Revolution" National Geographic: April 1997
- "Reinventing Berlin" National Geographic: December 1996
- "Toronto" National Geographic: June 1996
- "Soviet Pollution," National Geographic: August 1994
  - "Lethal Legacy: Pollution in the Former U.S.S.R."
  - "Chernobyl: Living With the Monster"
- "A Broken Empire" National Geographic: March 1993
  - "Russia: Playing by New Rules"
  - "Kazakhstan: Facing the Nightmare"
  - "Ukraine: Running on Empty"
- "Main-Danube Canal Links Europe's Waterways," National Geographic: August 1992.
- "The Morning After: Germany Reunited" National Geographic: September 1991.
