= Carol Beckwith =

American photographer, author and artist (born 1945)

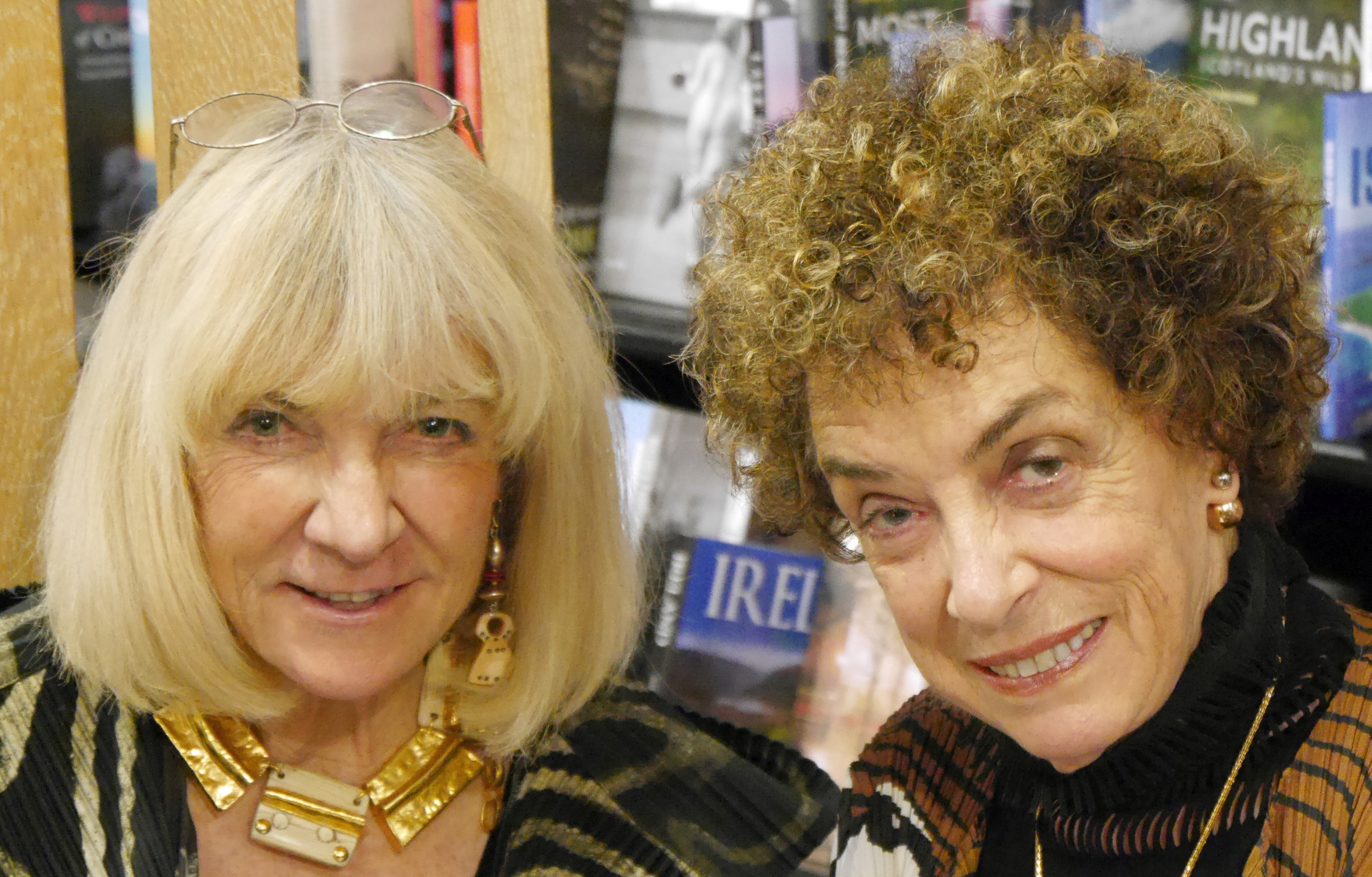
- Angela Fisher (left) and Carol Beckwith (right), Hatchards, London, November 2018
- Born: July 10, 1945 (age 81); Boston, Massachusetts, US
- Education: School of the Museum of Fine Arts, Boston
- Occupation: Photographer
- Notable work: Maasai, Nomads of Niger, African Ceremonies, Passages, Lamu, African Ark, Dinka

Carol Beckwith (born July 10, 1945) is an American photographer, writer, and artist known for her photojournalism documenting the indigenous tribal cultures of Africa, most notably in partnership with the Australian photographer Angela Fisher. Between them, Beckwith and Fisher have published 14 books, and have had their photos appear in National Geographic, Natural History, African Arts, The Observer Magazine, Time, Life, Vogue, Marie Claire and Elle.

They continue to exhibit and lecture at galleries and museums worldwide, including The American Museum of Natural History and The Explorers Club in New York City, The Smithsonian Institution in Washington, DC, and the Royal Geographical Society in London. They have also collaborated on four films about African traditions. Together they have received numerous accolades, including the United Nations Award for Excellence, the Royal Geographical Society's Cherry Kearton Medal, two Anisfield-Wolf Book Awards, The Explorers Club's Lowell Thomas Award, and the WINGS WorldQuest Lifetime Achievement Award.

== Biography ==
=== Early life ===
Carol Beckwith was born in Boston, Massachusetts, where she went on to attend both the School of the Museum of Fine Arts, Boston and Goucher College in Maryland. After obtaining her degree in Painting and Photography, she won a traveling fellowship from the Boston Museum, which let her travel to other countries for the first time.

She spent seven months in Japan, living in a Zen temple and studying calligraphic painting. She continued to travel through Southeast Asia and New Guinea, where she witnessed a "sing-sing", a gathering of 90,000 Highland warriors, in Mount Hagen, and paddled up Chambri Lakes in a canoe, an experience she called "one of the most wonderful, and in a way formative, experiences in my life."

Her first trip to Africa was in 1973, when she was invited to spend Christmas with a friend in Kenya. Beckwith bought a 45-day roundtrip ticket and ended up staying eight months. There she encountered the Maasai people who invited her to witness a female circumcision ceremony. Astonished by the ritual, she then determined to spend more time with the Maasai.

=== Career ===
Beckwith studied photography in college but had initially intended to become a painter. It was during her travels through New Guinea that she realized the advantages of photography, saying that "there was such a vast amount of exciting material that I began to photograph instead, approaching photography with the eye of a painter in terms of light, color, composition. I wanted the images to be multilayered experiences in a way that a painting is. . . [Photography] seemed to be a more suitable medium for the pace of travel."

Beckwith's first major collaboration was with Tepilit Ole Saitoti, an anthropologist and former Maasai warrior whom she met in Boston during one of her painting exhibitions. Their collaboration produced the book Maasai (Abrams, 1980). She also collaborated with anthropologist Marion van Offelen to produce Nomads of Niger (Abrams, 1983), a monograph on the Wodaabe cattle herders. Although she did not have formal training in anthropology, through working alone as well as with other anthropologists such as Saitoti, van Offelen and Linda Donley-Reid, she "was able to absorb techniques of interviewing, to learn what questions to ask in order to explore the many aspects of traditional African life."

=== Collaboration with Angela Fisher ===
Beckwith first heard about Angela Fisher through Fisher's brother Simon in 1974, during a hot air balloon ride in Maasai country. They met during Fisher's exhibition of traditional African jewelry in Nairobi, where they discovered they shared a passion for documenting traditional African cultures. Within one week, they were photographing a Maasai warrior ceremony together.

During more than three decades of collaboration, they produced African Ark (Abrams, 1990), African Ceremonies (Abrams, 1999), Passages (Abrams, 2000), Surma (Taller Experimental, 2002), Karo (Taller Experimental, 2002), Maasai, Himba, Hamar (Taller Experimental, 2002), Faces of Africa (Abrams, 2004), Lamu: Kenya's Enchanted Island (Abrams, 2009), and Dinka (Abrams, 2010). They are currently (2011) working on completing their pan-African study of the art of body painting for a book entitled Africa: Spirit of Paint, as well as on their third and final installation of African Ceremonies, titled African Twilight, scheduled for publication in 2013. Beckwith resides in New York City and Fisher in London.

== Media ==
=== Books ===
- 1980 Maasai (text by Tepilit Ole Saitoti.). USA: Abrams; UK, Germany and France: Abradale.
- 1983 Nomads of Niger (text by Marion van Offelen.). USA: Abrams; France: Abradale.
- 1990 African Ark: People and Ancient Cultures of Ethiopia and the Horn of Africa (co-authored with Angela Fisher and Graham Hancock). USA, UK, France, Germany and Italy: Abrams.
- 1999 African Ceremonies I (co-authored with Angela Fisher). USA, UK, France, Germany and Italy: Abrams. United Nations "Award for Excellence" for 1999.
- 1999 African Ceremonies II (co-authored with Angela Fisher). USA, UK, France, Germany and Italy: Abrams. United Nations "Award for Excellence" for 1999.
- 2000 Passages (co-authored with Angela Fisher). USA and France: Abrams.
- 2002 African Ceremonies Concise (co-authored with Angela Fisher). USA and France: Abrams.
- 2002 Surma (co-authored with Angela Fisher). Santiago, Chile: Taller Experimental.
- 2002 Karo (co-authored with Angela Fisher). Santiago, Chile: Taller Experimental.
- 2002 Maasai, Himba, Hamar (co-authored with Angela Fisher). Santiago, Chile: Taller Experimental.
- 2004 Faces of Africa (co-authored with Angela Fisher). USA and France: National Geographic Society.
- 2008 Dinka: 2008 (co-authored with Angela Fisher). Chile: R.E.Producciones; California, USA: Timeless Art Productions. HP Indigo Award.
- 2009 Lamu: Kenya's Enchanted Island (co-authored with Angela Fisher, David Coulson and Nigel Pavitt). USA: Rizzoli. ForeWord Reviews' "Book of the Year" Award for 2009.
- 2010 Dinka: Legendary Cattle Keepers of Sudan (co-authored with Angela Fisher). USA: Rizzoli.
- 2012 Painted Bodies: African Body Painting, Tattoos and Scarification. USA: Rizzoli
- 2018 African Twilight: The Vanishing Rituals and Ceremonies of the African Continent. USA: Rizzoli

=== Film and TV ===
- 1986 Way of the Wodaabe
- 1988 Nomads of Niger
- 1990 The Painter and the Fighter
- 1992 Millennium: Tribal Wisdom and the Modern World

== Awards and honors ==
- 1991: Anisfield-Wolf Book Award in race relations for "outstanding contributions to the understanding of cultural diversity and prejudice"
- 1999: United Nations Award for Excellence
- 2009: Book of the Year Award from ForeWord Reviews
- 2009: Image Award from Sociedad Geográfica Española
- Cherry Kearton Medal from the Royal Geographical Society of London for their "contribution to the photographic recording of African ethnography and ritual"
- 2010: Lowell Thomas Award from The Explorers Club honoring men and women who have distinguished themselves in the field of exploration
- 2010: Lifetime Achievement Award from WINGS WorldQuest honoring the accomplishments of visionary women
