= Sam Abell =

American photographer

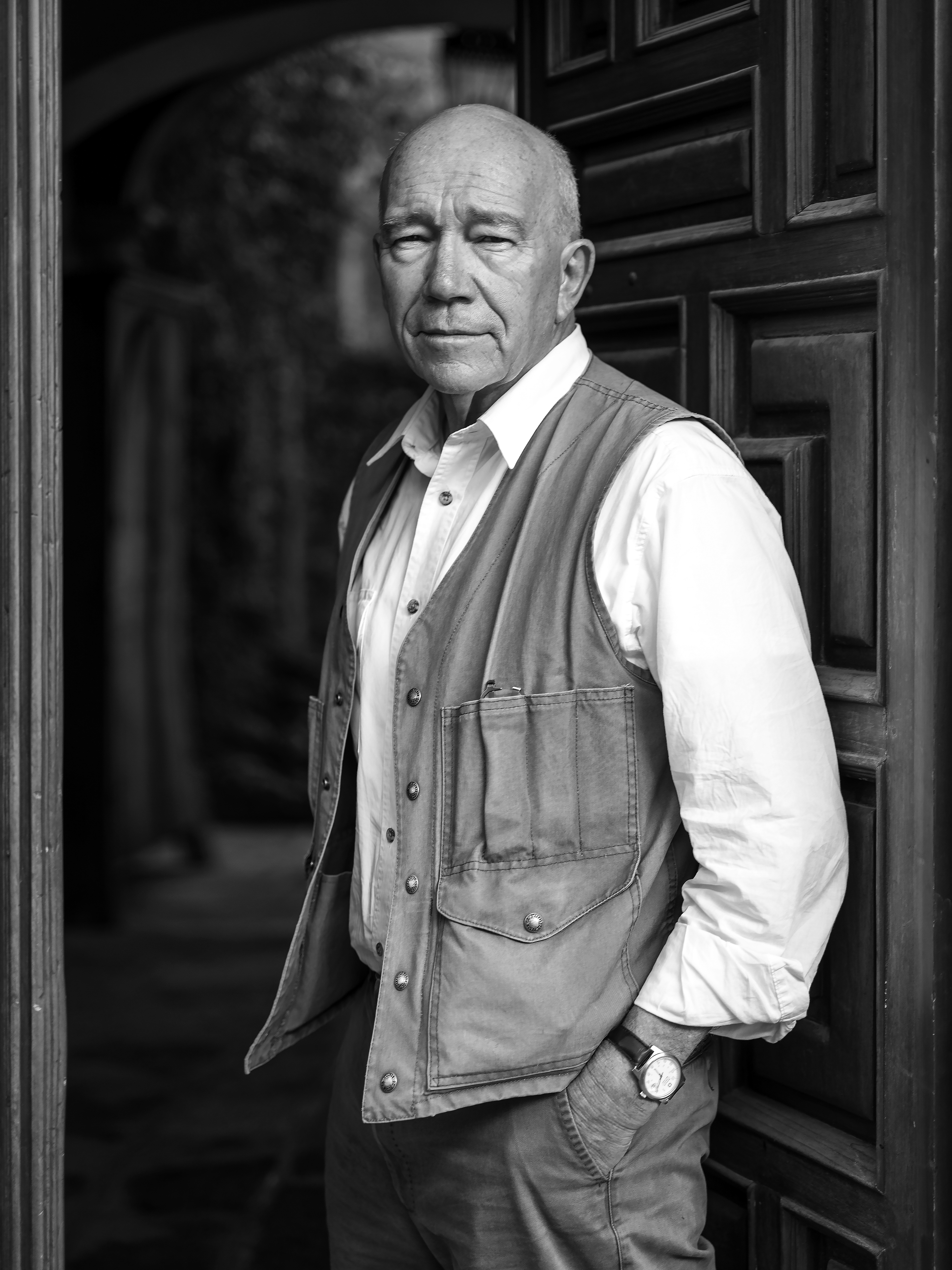
Sam Abell in San Miguel de Allende (2016)

Sam Abell (born February 19, 1945) is an American photographer known for his frequent publication of photographs in National Geographic.

== Life ==
Abell was born in Sylvania, Ohio. His father, a geography teacher, ran a photography club. In his book The Photographic Life, Abell mentions a photograph he made while on an outing with his father, a photograph that subsequently won a small prize in a photo contest. He credits that prize as being a major influence on the direction his life would take.

Abell graduated B.A. from the University of Kentucky in English in 1969. He is also a teacher, artist and author. He began to work for National Geographic in 1976. He received an honorary Doctor of Letters degree from the University of Toledo in 2009.

The Life of a Photograph is one of a three-volume series begun in 2000 with Seeing Gardens. It was followed in 2002 with The Photographic Life.

In 2024, Sam received the Lifetime Achievement Award from The Photo Society, and was inducted into the International Photography Hall of Fame.

== Publications ==
=== Publications by Sam Abell ===
- Amazonia, Sam Abell, 2010 ISBN 087114087X
- The Life of A Photograph, Sam Abell, 2008 ISBN 1426203292
- Seeing Gardens (National Geographic), Sam Abell, 2000 ISBN 0792279565

=== Collaborative Publications ===
- Stay This Moment: Photographs of Sam Abell, Sam Abell and Robert E. Gilka, 1990 ISBN 0934738726
