= Sugar Hollow =

Valley in Virginia, United States of America

Coordinates: 38°7′48.17″N 78°42′22.50″W

Sugar Hollow is located in the Blue Ridge Mountains of western Albemarle County, Virginia, United States. It is defined by the north and south forks of Moorman's River which drain into a reservoir built in 1947, that supplies water for the city of Charlottesville, Virginia. The Appalachian Trail runs north and south along the upper reaches of this beautiful natural area.

Sugar Hollow was once inhabited by members of the Monacan Indian Nation, a Native American tribe linguistically related to the Sioux. With the coming of Europeans in the early 18th century these groups departed westward over the mountain into the valley and beyond. They left behind such evidences as a burial mound and projectile points.

By the late 1920s Sugar Hollow was populated by hundreds of families, most of whom were subsistence farmers. They had erected schools, churches, mills, and various businesses that capitalized on the abundant timber resources of that area. The creation of Shenandoah National Park forced most of those families off their ancestral homelands. Shenandoah National Park was created entirely from private lands that were taken by the State of Virginia through the law of eminent domain. Residents in the upper reaches of this mountain hollow were forced to either move west, across the mountain into Augusta County, Virginia, or Rockingham County, Virginia, or else move farther down the Blue Ridge to the east. This physical human displacement forever changed the character of this mountainous region. Bitter controversy surrounded the establishment of Shenandoah National Park. Displaced family clans were splintered, their homes removed and many ancestral burying grounds were necessarily abandoned.

A well-maintained public road from the east, passing through the village of White Hall, Albemarle County, Virginia, now allows vehicular access into lower Sugar Hollow. An unpaved parking area above the reservoir, just outside the Shenandoah National Park boundary, gives day-hikers access to trails that parallel the river's forks. The personal sacrifices of an earlier generation provide nature-centered recreational opportunities today.
