= John G. Mitchell (editor) =

John G. Mitchell (b. Cincinnati, Ohio – died July 7, 2007 Albany, NY) was an American environmentalist and former editor of National Geographic from 1994 until 2004.
