= Richard Conniff =

American non-fiction writer

- Born: March 2, 1951 (age 75)
- Occupation: Non-fiction writer, journalist, television presenter
- Genre: Science writing, natural history, nature writing
- Subject: Human and animal behavior, wildlife, history

Website
- richardconniff.com

Richard Conniff (born March 2, 1951) is an American non-fiction writer, specializing in human and animal behavior.

== Career ==
Conniff also writes about wildlife, human cultures and other topics for Time, Smithsonian, Atlantic Monthly, The New York Times Magazine, National Geographic, Audubon Magazine, Yale Environment 360, Scientific American and other publications in the United States and abroad. His magazine work in Smithsonian won the 1997 National Magazine Award, and was included in The Best American Science and Nature Writing in 2000, 2002, and 2006. Conniff is also the winner of the 2001 John Burroughs Award for Outstanding Nature Essay of the Year, a 2007 Guggenheim Fellowship, and a 2009 Loeb Journalism Award.

Conniff has been a frequent commentator on NPR and has served as a contributing opinion writer for The New York Times. He has written and presented television shows for National Geographic Channel, TBS, Animal Planet, the BBC, and Channel Four in the UK. His television work has been nominated for an Emmy Award for distinguished achievement in writing, and he won the 1998 Wildscreen Prize for Best Natural History Television Script for the BBC show Between Pacific Tides.

== Honors and awards ==
- 1997 National Magazine Award
- Best American Science and Nature Writing (2000, 2002, and 2006)
- 2001 John Burroughs Award for Outstanding Nature Essay of the Year
- 2007 Guggenheim Fellowship
- 2009 Gerald Loeb Award for Online business journalism for "Middle Class Crunch"
- 2012 Alicia Patterson Journalism Fellow
- 2020 Alfred P. Sloan Foundation grant

== Writing ==
=== Books ===
- Ending Epidemics: A History of Escape from Contagion. MIT Press. 2023. ISBN 9780262047968.
- House of Lost Worlds: Dinosaurs, Dynasties, and the Story of Life on Earth. Yale University Press. 2016. ISBN 978-0-300-21163-4.
- The Species Seekers: Heroes, Fools, and the Mad Pursuit of Life on Earth. W. W. Norton & Company. 2010. ISBN 978-0-393-06854-2.
- Swimming with Piranhas at Feeding Time: My Life Doing Dumb Stuff with Animals. W. W. Norton & Company. 2009. ISBN 978-0-393-30457-2.
- The Ape in the Corner Office: How to Make Friends, Win Fights, and Work Smarter By Understanding Human Nature. Crown. 2004. ISBN 978-1-4000-5219-6.
- The Natural History of the Rich: A Field Guide. W. W. Norton & Company. 2002. ISBN 978-0-393-32488-4. "richard conniff."
- Rats!: the good, the bad, and the ugly, Crown Publishers, 2002, ISBN 978-0-375-91207-8
- Every Creeping Thing: True Trales of Faintly Repulsive Wildlife, (Henry Holt, 1998) ISBN 978-0-8050-5697-6
- Spineless Wonders: Strange Tales from the Invertebrate World (Henry Holt, 1996) ISBN 978-0-8050-4218-4
- Irish Walls (with photographer Alen MacWeeney) (Stewart, Tabori & Chang, 1986) ISBN 978-0-941434-78-2
- The Devil's Book of Verse: Masters of the Poison Pen from Ancient Times to the Present Day (Everest House, 1983) ISBN 978-0-89696-186-9 :

=== Selected magazine articles ===
- TIME: Head Man in the Boneyard (1990)
- TIME: Water Marketing A Deal That Might Save A Sierra (1989)
- The Atlantic: Darwin's Revenge (2008)
- The Atlantic: Heart of Darwin (2008)
- New York Times: Abolish All 'Taxes' (op-ed, 2008)
- The World Before Vaccines is a World We Can’t Afford to Forget (2019)
- Why Putting Solar Canopies on Parking Lots Is a Smart Green Move (2021)
- The Unsung Heroes Who Ended a Deadly Plague (2022)
