= Cotton Coulson =

Photographer known for his work for National Geographic magazine

Cotton Coulson (1952 – May 27, 2015 in Tromsø, Norway) was a photographer known for his work for National Geographic magazine.

== Professional life ==
Coulson graduated from New York University Film School in 1975, and was hired by National Geographic in 1976, after having begun contributing to them as a freelancer in 1975.

He also worked at The Baltimore Sun, where he was a director of photography, and at U.S. News & World Report, where he was an associate director of photography.

In 1996, he collaborated with Rick Smolan on Smolan's "24 Hours in Cyberspace" project; he subsequently joined CNET, where he was senior vice-president of creative services until 1999, at which point he was promoted to vice president and executive producer.

== Death ==
On May 24, 2015, Coulson was scuba diving in the waters of the Svalbard Archipelago as part of a photography assignment, when he signaled to his diving partner that he needed to surface immediately. By the time they emerged from the water, he was unresponsive; CPR was performed, but he died in hospital three days later, without having ever regained consciousness.

== Personal life ==
Coulson was married to fellow photographer Sisse Brimberg, who was also his professional partner; they met at a photography seminar in 1976.

He was named for Cotton Mather.
