= Cary Wolinsky =

American photographer (1947–2023)

Cary Wolinsky (October 14, 1947 - June 23, 2023) was a photojournalist and art photographer. He was best known for his photographic stories published regularly in National Geographic magazine starting in 1972.

== Early life and education ==
Wolinsky grew up in Jeannette, Pennsylvania, a glass-manufacturing town. His father was a photographer in Europe throughout World War II. At age twelve, Cary Wolinsky was making photographs of his hometown and creating prints in his basement darkroom.

In 1965, Wolinsky entered the photojournalism program at Boston University.

== Photography career ==
Wolinsky began working as a news photographer for The Boston Globe in 1968.

In 1972, he was a freelance photo-story provider to several magazines and became a contract photographer for National Geographic magazine in the mid 1980s.

For a 1988 story on wool published in National Geographic, he wanted to show what a season’s growth of wool on a sheep looked like. He commissioned a professional sheep shearer in Australia to carefully clip one side of a sheep to create a profile view to make the point. The first half-sheared, lopsided sheep toppled over. The 30th sheep shearing worked well and the photograph was used as the lead shot in the article.

Wolinsky's fine art prints have been acquired and exhibited by many museums including Boston’s Museum of Fine Arts, the Cleveland Museum of Art, and the Fogg Museum.
