= Joel Swerdlow =

American journalist

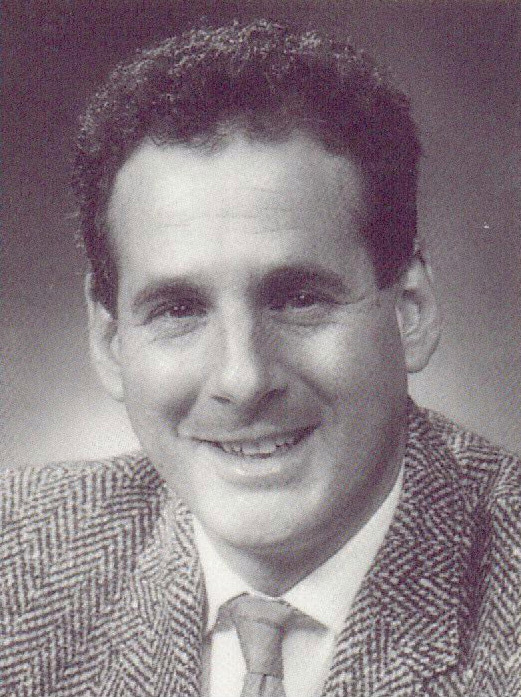
- Born: Washington, D.C.
- Occupations: Journalist, editor, teacher
- Spouse: Marjorie L. Share
- Writing career
- Notable works: Nature's Medicine: Plants that Heal; The Vietnam Veteran's Wall: To Heal a Nation (with Jan Scruggs)
- Website: jswerdlow.com

Joel L. Swerdlow is an American author, editor, journalist, researcher, and educator. His works include To Heal a Nation: The Story of the Vietnam Veterans Memorial, co-authored with Jan Scruggs, which became a 1988 NBC movie. His articles have been published in American newspapers and magazines, and international publications have translated his work into more than three dozen languages for international publication. For ten years, he worked as a senior writer and assistant editor of National Geographic, and was the lead writer for the magazine's 1998–1999 Millennium series.

== Life and work ==
Swerdlow was born in Washington, D.C., and raised in areas including Burma (the Union of Myanmar) and France. He received his undergraduate degree in political science (B.A., cum laude) from Syracuse University, and his M.A. in American government and Ph.D. from Cornell University in 1974. His doctoral dissertation examined voting behavior in presidential primary elections. It discussed the question: how representative of the general population are the views of people who vote in presidential primaries?

Swerdlow has taught at Georgetown University and Johns Hopkins University, and currently teaches at the Washington, D.C., campus of the University of Texas (UT) as an adjunct professor.

His UT course is entitled "Politics, Power and Poetry" and the textbooks are Walt Whitman's Leaves of Grass and Readings to Accompany Walks Across Washington (2010). At Johns Hopkins, he taught two graduate seminars: (1) "Notions of Progress," which grew out of his observation that throughout recorded history complex societies have adopted and then abandoned a technology on three times; (2) History of Communications Technologies, which put the advent of the Internet in the context of its evolution from previous technologies, beginning with writing. He served as Faculty Director for the Special Academic Honors Seminar for The Washington Center for Internships and Academic Seminars (2006).

He was a senior writer and assistant editor for National Geographic, and its lead writer for the 1998–1999 Millennium series. His articles have been included in two collections: Best of the Washington Post, and From the Field: Writing From National Geographic Magazine. He was a National Magazine Awards finalist for his December 1994 story, "America's Poet: Walt Whitman," and he was cited again in 2000, for general excellence. Additionally, his writing is included in books that present the "best of" articles from the Washington Post and National Geographic Magazine. A Washington Post critic praised his work as taking National Geographic Magazine into exploration that is "biological, anthropological, spiritual."

Swerdlow covered the White House and the Watergate conspiracy trial for National Public Radio (NPR). Referred to as a "debate historian" in an article about current debates (such as one focusing on the performance of Sarah Palin), he is quoted as saying that even "the Lincoln-Douglas encounters were popular mostly because they were excellent theater and not because what was said was particularly wise or revealing." He has written about and been interviewed about past political debates, especially Presidential debates, and is a frequent commentator and panelist on television specials on a wide range of topics, including the April 10, 2000 C-SPAN program The Future of Exploration, focusing on the goals of environmentalists, scientists, and explorers in the pursuit of "unraveling the mysteries" of our planet.

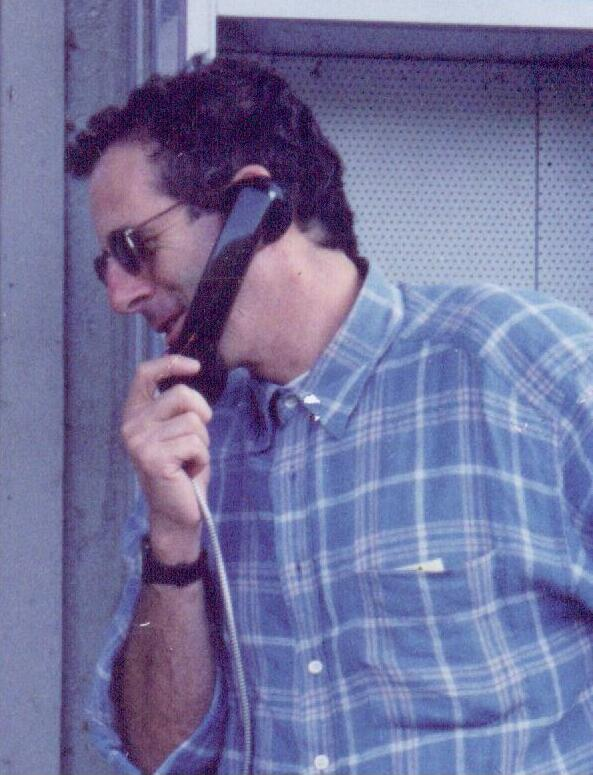
Joel Swerdlow

Before writing his doctoral dissertation, Swerdlow worked from the summer of 1971 to the fall of 1972 for the McGovern for President Committee; he joined the campaign as a field organizer when it had only $2500 in its campaign fund, with his efforts recounted in works such as Ted Van Dyk's "Heroes, Hacks and Fools: Memoirs from the political arena," and Hunter S. Thompson's Fear and Loathing on the Campaign Trail '72.

In 1974, he was the campaign manager of Mario Cuomo's unsuccessful campaign for lieutenant governor of New York in the Democratic primary on a ticket headed by Howard J. Samuels.

Swerdlow was the assistant producer and writer of the documentary The Gift of a Lifetime, on the subject of organ and tissue donation. He served as the University of Wisconsin Science Writer in Residence during the Fall of 2004. His residency included the delivery of the public lecture, "The Rest are Left to Die: Health Care Rationing and the News Media."

In addition to Swerdlow's work on the book and movie versions of To Heal a Nation: The Vietnam Veterans Memorial, he was on the Cornell University committee that created the 1993 university memorial to Cornell graduates who died in the Korean and Vietnam Wars.

His research has been supported by the Ford Foundation, the Wallace Foundation, and the U.S. Department of Defense. He has served as Guest Scholar at Smithsonian's Woodrow Wilson Center, where he studied how the news coverage of three instances in which the U.S. had to openly ration action to life-saving technologies: iron lungs from the 1920s-1940s; penicillin for civilians during World War II; and kidney dialysis in the 1960s and early 1970s.

He was a Senior Fellow and Director of Programs and Publications at the Washington Annenberg Program of the University of Pennsylvania and University of Southern California and later Northwestern University; adviser to the President of the Museum of Television and Radio; and consultant to the National Defense University; ABC News; United States Information Agency; Corporation for Public Broadcasting; U.S. Department of Commerce; U.S. Information Agency; National Endowment for the Humanities; and the Robert Wood Johnson Foundation.

Swerdlow's medical and science writing began as a writer for U.S. News & World Report books, He contributed, for example, to Blood: The River of Life, which was part of The Human Body series. He is coauthor of The Bug Stops Here: Force Protection and Emerging Infectious Diseases, published by the Center for Technology and National Security Policy of National Defense University in Washington, D.C. For the Robert Wood Johnson Foundation he wrote "Special Reports" on rural infant care, at-risk adolescents, and other topics related to the provision of health care, such as the 1986 report, "Four-year effort cuts infant deaths in isolated rural counties by medical school-public health linkages."

His academic articles and presentations include "A New Approach to Combating Infectious diseases," and "Lessons from Malaria," which argues that "malaria offers important lessons in the relationship between plants and human disease because two of the three broad categories of drugs that modern medicine now uses to treat and prevent malaria come from plants."

Swerdlow's essay, "Audience for the Arts in the Age of Electronics" analyzes how "growing intimacy with and dependency upon electronics" is changing virtually every form of artistic expression.

He has lectured at the Baylor College of Medicine, Smithsonian Institution, National Baseball Hall of Fame, the Massachusetts Institute of Technology, as an adjunct professor at American University, Notre Dame University and the International City Management Association. Topics have included: "1 Billion Cokes a Day: World Culture at the Millennium," "Everyone On Earth Could Fit Easily into Texas," Finding Geography in Surprising Places,""Why Do Some Plants Cure Cancer?," "Moving from Absurd to Obvious," and "The Rest are Left to Die: Health Care Rationing and the News Media."

Swerdlow decided to become a writer in part because he believed that power in American society, specifically, the ability to have a positive impact, was increasingly moving from political and governmental institutions to the mass media. In an August 1999 article entitled, "The Power of Writing," in National Geographic magazine, he wrote that "No other invention-perhaps only the wheel comes close-has had a longer and greater impact. ... Writing has an almost magical power: Words on paper, created by ordinary citizens, have overthrown governments and changed the course of history." He was the first to introduce the word and the concept "Internet" to National Geographic readers; he also was the first to tell National Geographic readers about E Ink, the technology that has made e-readers possible.

In Swerdlow's analysis entitled "Information Revolution" in the October 1995 issue of National Geographic he wrote of what he called "the growing cult-like faith in information." Swerdlow predicted that as we become more plugged it, what he called "Skin" time, that is, face-to-face contact with other people, would become more important. Swerdlow writes of the need to balance faith in technology with faith in ourselves, nothing that "What we hold most valuable--things like morality and compassion--can be found only within us," and that"while embracing the future, we can remain loyal to our unchanging humanity," saying that "we'll always need some skin."

Among his experiments as a writer include a "dual narrative" technique in which two voices take turns tell stories; these voices as be two different people (as in "Lullaby in Color") or the same person speaking from two different chronological points in his life (Horizon Beyond).

His writing has been reprinted and used as required reading in undergraduate and graduate courses in fields ranging from political science and journalism to history and religion: for example, "War and Revolution in the Western World," and "Writing about society." "To Heal a Nation" is frequently recommended in other works, such as Edward Linenthal's Sacred Ground: Americans and their Battlefields, which notes: "The sensitivity regarding martial monuments is perhaps best revealed in the celebrated controversies over the Vietnam Veterans Memorial. For a thorough introduction to this story, see Jan C. Scruggs and Joel L. Swerdlow, "To Heal a Nation: The Vietnam Veterans Memorial."

Swerdlow's internet blog, Larger Pie, uses "economic growth" as a lens through which to examine what Swerdlow describes as "democracy, morality, fairness, the American Dream, and what life is all about," and shares information that will ultimately be included in a future book, "Growing the Pie." He wrote a web documentary cited as "Web Worthy" in 2005 by the International Academy of Digital Arts and Sciences.

Swerdlow is on the board of the Global Initiative for Traditional Systems (GIFTS) of Health.

Swerdlow lives in Washington, D.C., with his wife Marjorie L. Share. They have two sons.

== Published writings ==
=== Books ===
Swerdlow is the author of nine books including one novel and is currently working on "Growing the Pie," about the "politics of economic growth." Additionally, he has contributed to a number of textbooks, either through original writing or with excerpts from larger works, in addition to articles included in collections such as "Best of the Washington Post" and "From the Field: Writings from National Geographic Magazine." His published books include:

- Beyond Debate: A Paper on Televised Presidential Debates (1974)
- Remote Control: Television and the Manipulation of American Life (with Frank Mankiewicz), (New York Times Books, 1978)
- Code Z (1979)
- To Heal a Nation: The Story of the Vietnam Veterans Memorial (Harper and Row, 1985)
- Presidential Debates: 1988 and Beyond (1987)
- Media Technology and the Vote: A Source Book (1988)
- Matching needs, saving lives: Building a comprehensive network for transplantation and biomedical research : a report on policy options (1989)
- Nature's Medicine: Plants That Heal: A chronicle of mankind's search for healing plants through the ages (National Geographic Books, 2000)

==== Nature's Medicine ====
For his 2000 book, "Nature's Medicine: Plants That Heal," Swerdlow spent five years traveling around the world, including Madagascar and India, to study plant-based medicine. With two siblings who were "Western-trained doctors," he reported that he started out his journeys as a "believer in Western, science-based medicine."

However, he is now convinced that there are non-Western approaches to medicine that must be taken seriously, to add to our arsenal of healing strategies. "I am not talking about herbal remedies," he said. But, "What I think we can do is invent a new kind of medicine." "Two-thirds of the world uses plant-based medicines because they simply don't have any choice." He believes Western medicine must consider drugs that have multiple active ingredients akin to the complex healing powers we find in the world of plants. "Opening up a plant and trying to find the part that heals is like opening up a radio and finding the part that makes the sound."

In a National Geographic News online release, Swerdlow described some ways that medicine is beginning to appreciate a new multi-faceted approach, along with an appreciation for the "billion years of evolution" that have produced today's plants and their healing properties:

In more than one billion years of evolution, plants have developed countless chemicals that help them ward off microbes such as bacteria, viruses, and fungi. These chemical combinations also give the plants protection from insects and herbivores.

"Most drugs have only one active ingredient," said Swerdlow commenting on current Western drug research focused on medicines that contain simple chemical compounds.

Swerdlow points out that some science-based medicines, such as the drug cocktail used to treat AIDS and a combination of chemotherapy drugs used to fight cancer, are using multiple active ingredient treatments.

Nature provides the most powerful cure-all drug, said Swerdlow. It has been scientifically proven to lower risks of heart disease, reduce chances of developing cancer, and prevent strokes (the three leading causes of death in the United States) all without side effects. This miracle drug is simply eating fruits and vegetables every day.

==== To Heal A Nation (with Jan Scruggs) ====
Howard K. Smith's introduction to this book begins with the impact of the Vietnam War as an "inflamed wound" on the body of American society:

Historians regard the civil war as America's most traumatic experience and the Great Depression as second most. A strong minority believes our scaring war in Vietnam is third, and some even think it should displace number two. The Depression was, after all, not very divisive; we were almost all in the same waterlogged boat, and hard times had a strangely unifying effect. Vietnam, on the other hand, is still an inflamed wound it hurts to touch, and partisans are still ready to tear at one another over the subject when it is resurrected from a dark place in our past.

With this "scarring war" as the backdrop to the idea of a memorial that could "heal a nation," Kay continues:

The sheer folly of the project that Scruggs and friends so boldly set for themselves makes this an adventure story with nearly as many unlikely escapes from extinction as an Indiana Jones adventure. First of all, they planned to achieve their purpose by erecting, of all things, a monument—in a city sinking under the weight of monuments and wanting no more.

As one newspaper review put it, "Using beautiful photographs and poignant letters from donors ... [this book] traces the story of ... [Jan Scruggs'] dream. "To Heal a Nation" is a moving account of how one man's idea grew into a national dream." A New York Times Sunday lead editorial cited the book's description of how opposition to the design of the memorial—called a "black gash of shame" and "Orwellian glop"—had dissipated with surprising speed.

In 1988 the book became a made-for-TV NBC movie.

==== Remote Control: Television and the Manipulation of American Life (with Frank Mankiewicz) ====
The review in the Washington Post's Book World called this book "provocative," noting that it "radically changes one's perception of events. ... the evidence builds up, and under the authors' skillful guidance one begins to see a clear pattern in television's influence on our lives. ... To an extent most of us do not realize, television has also taken hold on the minds of our children, accustomed a whole generation to instant solutions and to rapidly changing but disconnected events, changed our sense of reality (events must now be 'certified' by television), made us addicted to violence and, most important, is increasingly shaping the events which it pretends only to report."

=== Articles (partial list) ===
Many of the articles written by Swerdlow for National Geographic can be found on that magazine's website. His articles, both for National Geographic and other publications, include:

- "Chinese Boxes" (with Frank Mankiewicz), Harper's Magazine, October 1976.
- "A Question of Impact," The Wilson Quarterly, Winter 1981.
- "America's Poet: Walt Whitman," National Geographic, December 1994.
- "Vincent van Gogh: Lullaby in Color," National Geographic, October 1997.
- "Making Sense of the Millennium," National Geographic, January 1998.
- "New York's Chinatown," National Geographic, August 1998.
- The Power of Writing," National Geographic, August 1999.
- Changing America, National Geographic Magazine, September 2001
- Op-ed, with Frank Mankiewicz, "New Deal? New Frontier? The days of presidential slogans may be gone," Washington Post, July 16, 2010.
