= Flip Nicklin =

American nature photographer

Charles "Flip" Nicklin (born 1948) is a nature photographer best known for his underwater photographs of whales. He has been called "one of the world's leading whale photographers."

== Early life ==
Nicklin's father Chuck is an underwater cinematographer. He taught Flip and his brother how to scuba dive at a young age—by age 14, he was an assistant dive instructor to his father and teaching others how to dive. Nicklin's family owned a dive shop near Pacific Beach, San Diego called the Diving Locker.

== Work ==
=== Photography ===
Nicklin was one of the first photographers to capture images of whales by swimming with them in the wild. He has worked extensively with National Geographic, supplying their magazines with photographs of whales. In 1976, he began working with the National Geographic Society as a deckhand and diving assistant for underwater photographers Bates Littlehales and Jonathan Blair. In 1980, he submitted his first proposal for a whale story to National Geographic, which they rejected. He has since completed at least eighteen whale-related projects on their behalf, however.

Nicklin frequently photographs whales underwater via freediving rather than scuba gear. As a freediver, he is able to reach depths of 90 ft (27 m). Above the surface, he photographs them from boats, small airplanes, or helicopters. He believes that his work helps promote conservation of whales by illustrating the evolving relationship that humans have with them, as well as by highlighting whale research and researchers.

=== Books ===
Nicklin has written several books about his experiences photographing whales in the wild. In 2007, he coauthored Face to Face with Dolphins with Linda Nicklin, and in 2008, the two coauthored Face to Face with Whales. In 2011, a coffee table book written by Nicklin titled Among Giants: A Life with Whales was published.

== Activism ==
In 2001, Nicklin co-founded the whale research association "Whale Trust." Other co-founders are whale researchers Jim Darling and Meagan Jones.

== Awards and honors ==
In 2012, the North American Nature Photography Association (NANPA) named him "Outstanding Photographer of the Year." In 2015, he was a featured keynote speaker at the NANPA Summit.
