= Jack Unruh =

American commercial illustrator (1935–2016)

Jack Unruh (July 31, 1935 – May 16, 2016) was an American commercial illustrator whose works featured in advertising projects for all types of companies. Unruh won several awards from the Society of Illustrators. His work focuses primarily on the outdoors.

== History ==
Unruh was born July 31, 1935, in Pretty Prairie, Kansas and primarily resided in Dallas, Texas. He died May 16, 2016.

Unruh earned a B.F.A. from Washington University in St. Louis. Among his projects are illustrations for the Congo Gorilla Forest at the Bronx Zoo. He is a former instructor at East Texas State University where two of his students were Michael Schwab and Gary Panter.

A native of Pretty Prairie, Kansas and the son of an Air Force pilot, Jack lived in a variety of places while growing up. After graduating from Washington University in St Louis he settled and began his illustration career in Dallas, Texas.

Much of his work parallels an interest in the outdoors, while some of the more conceptual illustrations are a result of waiting for the hatch or watching the sunset over West Texas quail country.

The results have been published in Entertainment Weekly, Rolling Stone, Atlantic Monthly, Time, Sports Illustrated, Reader's Digest, New York, National Geographic, Sports Afield, Field and Stream, GQ, Road and Track and Texas Monthly. See the most recent article:

Annual reports include Borg Warner, MCI, Transamerica, Halliburton, Brinker International, Herman Miller, Sony, Hartford Financial Services, United Technologies, Entergy and Reader's Digest. IBM, Citicorp, Exxon/Mobil, Budweiser, American Airlines, Champion Paper, Interstate Batteries, Remington Firearms, Leatherman Tools, Avia, Georgia Pacific, The Bronx Zoo, Sage Rods, Kendall Jackson, Pac Bell are among Unruh's many advertising assignments.

Unruh has appeared in Communication Arts Illustration Annual since its inception and has been in numerous shows of American Illustration, Graphis, AIGA and Print. Graphis featured an article, "Jack Unruh, Quick on the Draw." in the 2002 Sept/Oct issue.

Awards include:

- Gold and Silver Medals - New York Society of Illustrators
- 1969 Art Director of the Year - Dallas Art Directors Club
- 1977 Golden Egg Award - Dallas Society of Visual Communications,
- 1988 Distinguished Alumni Award - Washington University
- 1998 Hamilton King Award - New York Society of Illustrators
- 2006 Illustrators Hall of Fame Induction - New York Society of Illustrators

== See also ==
- Illustrator
- List of illustrators
