= Robb Kendrick =

American photographer (born 1963)

Robb Kendrick (born 1963 in Spur, Texas) is an American photographer. He has photographed 16 feature stories for National Geographic magazine, and has published three photo books. In addition to his color documentary work, he makes images on tintype, a historical photo process that was popular in the mid-19th century. His portraits of modern-day cowboys on tintype have been compared to Edward Curtis' portraits of Native Americans. Robb Kendrick refrains from using social media focusing instead on his family.

== Books by Robb Kendrick ==
- Perfume (1999, National Geographic Society, ISBN 0-7922-7378-8)
- Revealing Character (2005, Bright Sky Press, ISBN 1-931721-57-2)
- Still: Cowboys at the Start of the 21st Century(2008, University of Texas Press, ISBN 978-0-292-71438-0)

== Exhibitions ==
- 2005-2008 Revealing Character-Touring Exhibition at eight museums within Texas.
- 2005 Revealing Character—Steven L. Clark Gallery, Austin, Texas.
