= Jan Scruggs =

American advocate for Vietnam veterans (born 1950)

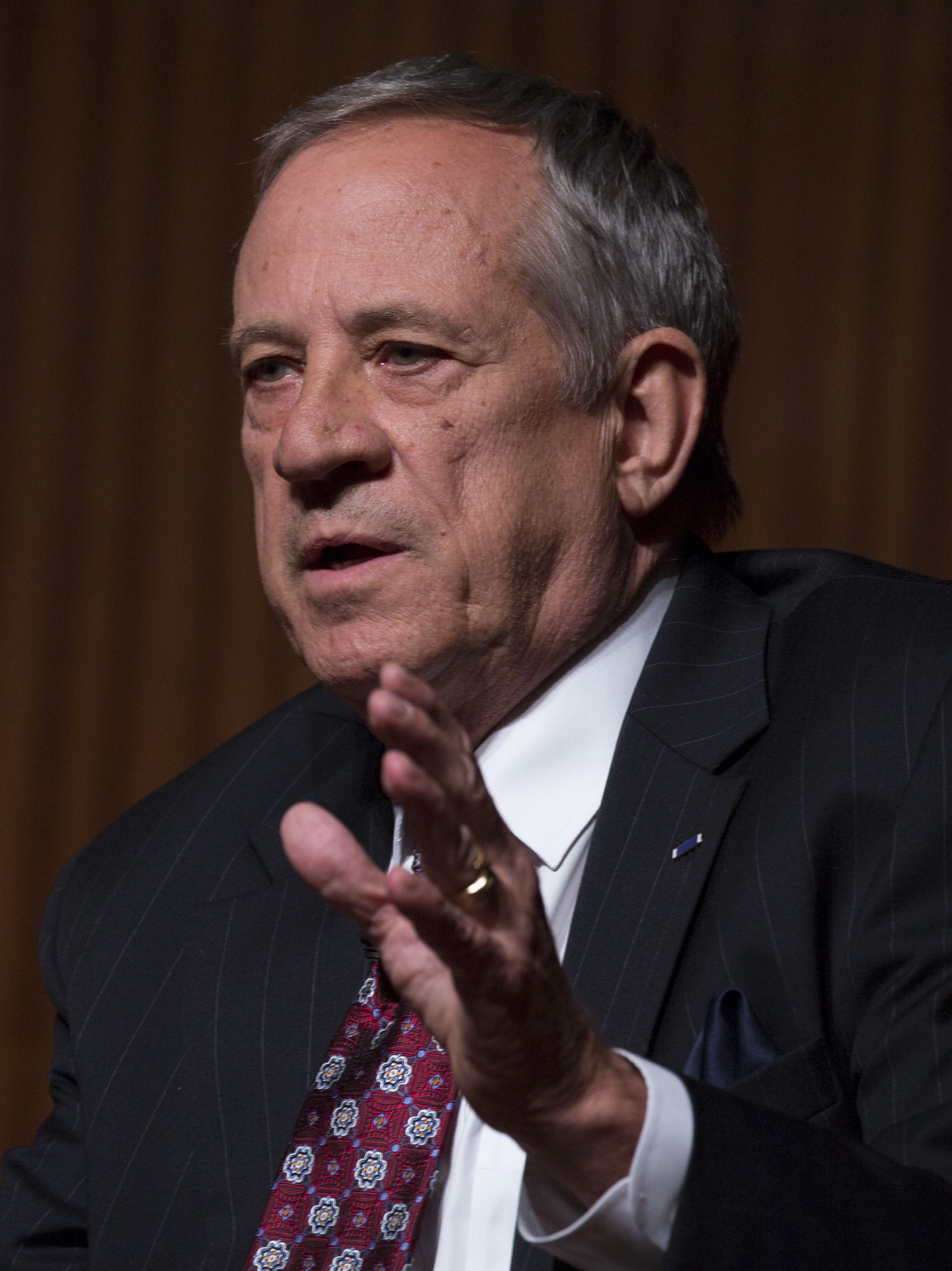
- Scruggs in 2016
- Born: Jan Craig Scruggs; March 11, 1950 (age 76); Bowie, Maryland, U.S.
- Occupation: Nonprofit foundation executive
- Known for: Conceiving and building the Vietnam Veterans Memorial
- Parent(s): James and Louise Scruggs

Jan Craig Scruggs (born March 11, 1950) is a United States Army veteran who served in the Vietnam War, and later founded the Vietnam Veterans Memorial Fund, which built the Vietnam Veterans Memorial in Washington, D.C., in the United States. Scruggs was the President of the foundation until 2015, when he retired.

== Early life and military career ==
Scruggs was born on March 11, 1950, in Bowie, Maryland to James and Louise Scruggs. He was the youngest of their four children. His father drove a taxicab and delivered milk door-to-door. His mother, who had dropped out of school in the eighth grade, worked as a waitress. His parents were from Alabama, where his older siblings were born, and moved to Maryland after World War II.

Scruggs' parents divorced when he was 14 years old. His mother moved away, and his father remarried when Scruggs was in his senior year in high school. The summer after he graduated from Bowie High School, he turned 19 years old. With his parents unable to afford college and feeling awkward at home around his newly married father and step-mother, he decided to leave home. He enlisted in the U.S. Army in August 1968, having given little thought to the fact that the Vietnam War was raging.

Trained as a mortarman, Scruggs was assigned to Company D, 4th Battalion, 12th Infantry Regiment, 199th Light Infantry Brigade. He was assigned to the 199th in Vietnam in April 1969 for a one-year tour of duty. In May 1969, his unit took up duty in the Xuân Lộc District northeast of Saigon. On May 27, 1969, his unit engaged the Viet Cong in a forested area. The next day, while leaving the jungle at about 9:30 AM, a rocket-propelled grenade attack left Scruggs wounded in his back, right arm, and both legs. Scruggs spent three months in the hospital, then returned to combat duty. Scruggs received the Purple Heart Medal for wounds received in combat.

In November 1969, Scruggs was involved in another firefight with the Viet Cong. During the battle, he retrieved a weapon from the battlefield while under fire, for which he was awarded an Army Commendation Medal, with 'Valor' device.

Scruggs signed up for a second one-year tour of duty in Vietnam. His unit was still serving in the Xuân Lộc District. On January 21, 1970, 12 of his comrades were killed when three mortar rounds accidentally exploded while being unloaded from a truck. (Note: The men were: Terrance Lee Drea, Thomas Mark Gaither, Pedro Acevedo Gonzalez, Roger Eugene Key, John Curtis Kroeger, Kenneth Richard Kroehler, Floyd Sanford McCreery, Larry Donnell Murray, John David Frederick Pies, Robert Hoyt Ruggles, Jerome Robert Sain, and Kerry Lamont Taylor.) Scruggs, who was more than 200 yards (180 m) away, was not injured in the blast, but the image of the explosion stayed with him.

Scruggs left the Army in March 1970 as a corporal, by which time he had also received three Army Commendation Medals, as well as the "V" device for Valor which is attached to the Army Commendation Medal.

== Vietnam Veterans Memorial work ==
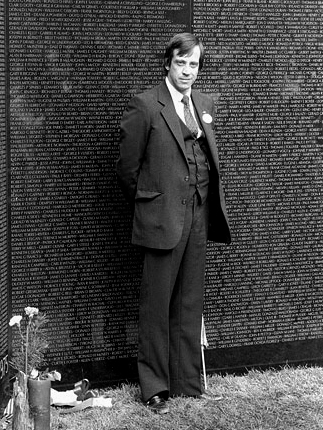
Scruggs at the Vietnam Veterans Memorial in 1982

=== Educational achievements ===
After leaving the Army, Scruggs returned to Maryland, where he obtained a job as a security guard at an apartment building and enrolled briefly at Prince George's Community College.

"[V]ery disillusioned and disenchanted" (Scruggs believes he was struggling with a mild form of posttraumatic stress disorder), Scruggs had difficulty adjusting to civilian life again. He quit his job and school, bought a motorcycle, and spent a year roaming the country, drinking heavily. During this time, he and another friend and veteran spent five months roaming southern California, drinking, goofing off, and visiting Native American reservations.

Returning to Maryland, Scruggs enrolled at American University in Washington, D.C. He met Becky Fishman at a 7-Eleven store late one night. They married in 1974. (Note: The Scruggs never had children.) Scruggs received his bachelor's degree from American University in 1975. He then enrolled in the graduate program in psychology, researching posttraumatic stress disorder. He received his master's degree in 1977.

Beginning in 1977, Scruggs began working as an investigator in the equal opportunity employment office at the United States Department of Labor. He was recognized as an expert on posttraumatic stress disorder, and testified before Congress on the issue.

=== Conceiving and building the Vietnam Veterans Memorial ===
In March 1979, Scruggs and his wife went to see The Deer Hunter, a drama about three friends whose experiences in the Vietnam War leave them badly emotionally scarred. That night, Scruggs began drinking and brooding over the film. About 3:00 AM, he began having flashbacks, particularly about the mortar truck accident that killed 12 of his friends. Toward dawn, the idea of a memorial with the names of American servicemembers who had died in the Vietnam War flashed into his mind. Scruggs told his wife about the idea the next morning. "I was a little worried about his mental health," she later said. "I wondered if he'd gone off the deep end." She also feared that he would pour their life savings into the idea, and leave them penniless.

Scruggs first raised the idea of a memorial at a local meeting of the Vietnam Veterans of America (VVA) shortly thereafter. He proposed an obelisk 30 feet (10 yd) high, erected without government funds, with the names of the dead inscribed on it. His idea was strongly opposed. Some felt the idea naive, while others argued it would distract the organization from winning better benefits for veterans.

Scruggs announced the formation of the Vietnam Veterans Memorial Fund (VVMF) on May 28, 1979, the start of Vietnam Veterans Week (a commemorative occasion organized by the VVA). He asked for and received permission from the Department of Labor for a week off to devote to his project. Scruggs soon quit his government job, spending 11 hours a day, six days a week running the VVMF. His wife, an administrative assistant for the Paralyzed Veterans of America, became the sole breadwinner in the family. (Note: She later became the office manager at a healthcare consulting firm.) After two months, Scruggs had raised just $144.50. About this time, CBS News weekend and weekday substitute anchorman Roger Mudd aired a report on the CBS Evening News ridiculing the fundraising effort. Mudd's brief report was used as material by late-night comedians.

Mudd's report, however, also raised the VVMF's profile, and soon Scruggs was raising thousands of dollars (most of the donations in the $5 and $10 range). Chuck Hagel, then deputy administrator of the United States Department of Veterans Affairs, became an early backer of the project, helping to steer even more donors the VVMF's way. John P. Wheeler III also saw the CBS News report. Wheeler, a Vietnam War veteran and attorney who led the drive to erect the Southeast Asia Memorial at the United States Military Academy (West Point), agreed to join the VVMF on a volunteer basis and help coordinate legislation, public relations and fundraising drive. Other graduates of West Point were crucial including Robert M Kimmitt, who later became the U.S. Ambassador to Germany. Scruggs gives credit for success of the endeavor to the graduates of West Point who volunteered their services and advice.

Over the next two years, Scruggs raised more than $8 million from private donors. He spearheaded the VVMF's legislative effort to get Congress to authorize the memorial and approve its location on the National Mall, and he shepherded the memorial's controversial design past the United States Commission of Fine Arts and other federal and local agencies. The work transformed Scruggs, says his wife, who "went from being a passive person to a very intense, ambitious man." Although Scruggs sometimes fell into a deep depression due to the constant criticism of the memorial effort and the memorial's design, he overcame the depression by calling up the memory of his 12 dead friends and by reading letters to the foundation written by veterans and their families.

The Vietnam Veterans Memorial was unveiled on November 13, 1982. He was interviewed in the book Boots on the ground by Elizabeth Partridge, where he talked about his experience in the war and in the making of the wall.

=== Post-Memorial work ===
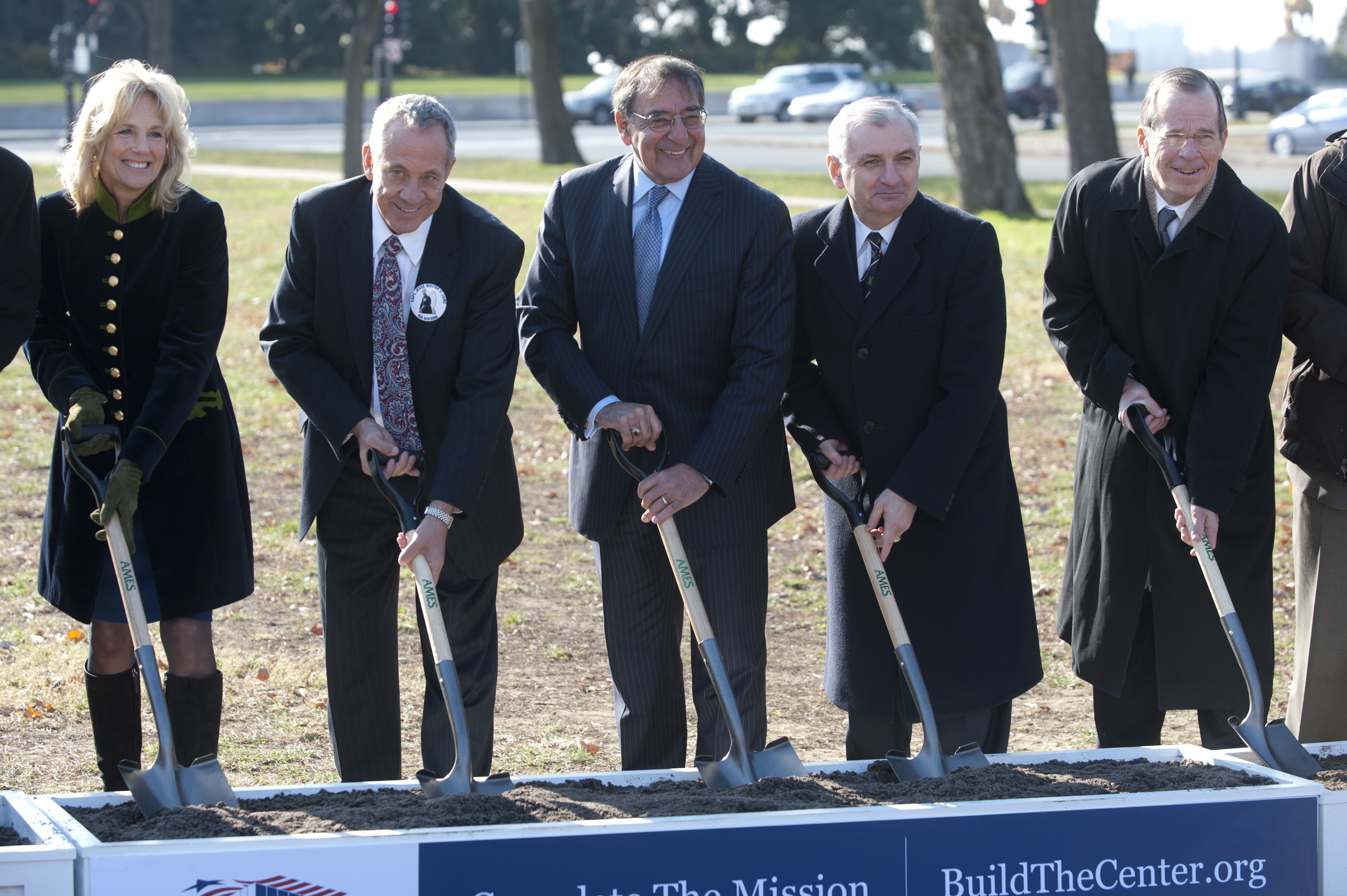
Scruggs, second from left, at the groundbreaking for the Education Center at Vietnam Veterans Memorial on November 28, 2012

Scruggs left the VVMF in 1985 to pursue other challenges. He sought a career as a corporate lobbyist, but found no one willing to hire him despite his success with the memorial. In the fall of 1987, Scruggs enrolled at the University of Maryland School of Law, graduating with a JD degree in 1990.

Unwilling to join a law firm and be managed by supervisors 15 years his junior, Scruggs rejoined the VVMF and began raising funds to celebrate the memorial's tenth anniversary. Although most memorial foundations fold once the memorial they support is completed, Scruggs made the decision to keep the VVMF going. In part, he was motivated by the neglect of the District of Columbia War Memorial, a structure on the National Mall which commemorates those individuals from the District of Columbia who lost their lives serving in World War I. Scruggs did not want the Vietnam Veterans Memorial to fall into disrepair, and felt that a strong VVMF would help avoid that. He and the Board of VVMF took note of groups like Friends of the Vietnam Veterans Memorial who were attempting to use the Memorial for sales of T-shirts.

In 2008, Scruggs underwent surgery to have a damaged valve in his heart replaced with an artificial one. Two years later, while driving home from a meeting in Richmond, Virginia, he passed out at the wheel of his automobile and ran off the road onto the shoulder. The artificial valve had become infected, and the infection caused him to black out. He underwent surgery again a short time later, replacing the artificial valve with a biological valve taken from a pig's heart.

Scruggs advocated for an "education center" to be built next to the Vietnam Veterans Memorial. His concern was that too few younger Americans knew much about the Vietnam War, and the memorial did little to educate them about the war or veterans' issues. By 2015, the VVMF had raised $27 million to build the education center, although Scruggs felt that millions more would be needed to complete and endow it. The current estimate is in the range of $100 million. Scruggs' tactics were successful, but created controversy among purists on the Mall issues. He remains hopeful that the center will find funding.

== Retirement ==
Scruggs retired from the Vietnam Veterans Memorial Fund at the end of June 2015. He told the newspaper Stars and Stripes that he intended to stay involved in charitable work. He is an advocate of a post-911 memorial, and is an advisor to the Global War on Terror Memorial Foundation. He also said he would indulge his hobbies of sailing, hiking, and skeet shooting. Scruggs was appointed Chairman of the National Appeals Board for Selective Service by President Obama on July 3, 2012.

Scruggs serves on the Vietnam War Commemoration administered by the Secretary of Defense. He also serves on the board of advisors of the Code of Support Foundation, a nonprofit military services organization.

Scruggs occasionally writes for Vietnam Magazine, Army Times and the New York Times.

== Book, awards and film ==
In 1983, Scruggs received the Samuel S. Beard Award for Greatest Public Service by an Individual 35 Years or Under, an award given annually by Jefferson Awards for Public Service.

In 1985, Scruggs published a memoir titled To Heal a Nation. The book was made into a 1988 television film, with Eric Roberts as Scruggs and Glynnis O'Connor as his wife, Becky.

== Bibliography ==
- Scott, Wilbur J. (2004). Vietnam Veterans Since the War: The Politics of PTSD, Agent Orange, and the National Memorial. Norman, Okla.: University of Oklahoma Press. ISBN 9780806135977.
