= Fred Ward (writer) =

African-Canadian writer and professor

Frederick Ward (1937–2017) was an African-Canadian poet, writer and professor. Born in Kansas City, Missouri in June 1937, he moved across different places including New Mexico, Detroit, Toronto and California before settling in Halifax, Canada in 1970. He studied at The Royal Conservatory of Music in Toronto, ON, the University of Kansas, and the University of Missouri before teaching at Dalhousie University in Halifax, NS and Dawson College in Montreal, QC. He studied jazz piano under Oscar Peterson. He wrote the script for the National Film Board feature, Train of Dreams (1987).

Ward's work has been examined in the following academic books: George Elliott Clarke's Directions Home: Approaches to African-Canadian Literature, which discusses why Ward has been excluded from literary anthologies and Winfried Siemerling's The Black Atlantic Reconsidered: Black Canadian Writing, Cultural History, and the Presence of the Past.

== Publications ==
=== Poetry ===
- Poems. Placitas, NM: Duende, 1966.
- Riverlisp. Plattsburgh, NY: Tundra, 1974.
- Nobody Called Me Mine. Plattsburgh, NY: Tundra, 1977.
- A Room Full of Balloons. Plattsburgh, NY: Tundra, 1981.
- The Curing Berry. Toronto, ON: Williams-Wallace, 1983.

=== Edited ===
- Anthology of Nine Baha'i Poets. Detroit, MI: Trans-Love Energies, 1968.
- Present Tense. Halifax, NS: New Options Press, 1972.
