= Sisse Brimberg =

Danish photographer

Marie Louise "Sisse" Brimberg (born 1948) is a Danish photographer who has completed some 30 photographic stories for National Geographic.

== Biography ==
After graduating from photography school in Denmark, Brimberg served an apprenticeship in a commercial studio. She then ran her own business in Copenhagen for five years, working in advertising. Thanks to a Danish grant, she was able to travel to the United States, where she studied photographic techniques at the National Geographic Society in Washington, D.C. In 1976, she became a National Geographic staff photographer, publishing more than 30 stories including features on Hans Christian Andersen, the Vikings and "Civilized Denmark". Her photographs of migrant workers earned her the Picture Story of the Year award from the National Press Photographers Association. Through her work with National Geographic, she traveled around the world photographing "city stories" in Oaxaca, Paris, Casablanca, and St. Petersburg, among many others. She has photographed in more than 70 countries, and the continent of Antarctica.

Brimberg is described as being based in Scotland but living in Copenhagen. Her late husband, former National Geographic colleague Cotton Coulson died in 2015. She has two children. Together they ran KeenPress, a company that provides photographs and videos for international companies, while contributing to National Geographic Traveler. The environment, climate and travel are among the topics covered by KeenPress.

Her advice for photographing people is to get close and make eye contact; many new photographers rely on their zoom lens too much. Oftentimes her husband and her would photograph as a pair; one interviewing while the other took the pictures. They found that really generated more trust during the street photography process.
