= Priit Vesilind =

Estonian-American writer and photographer (1943–2023)

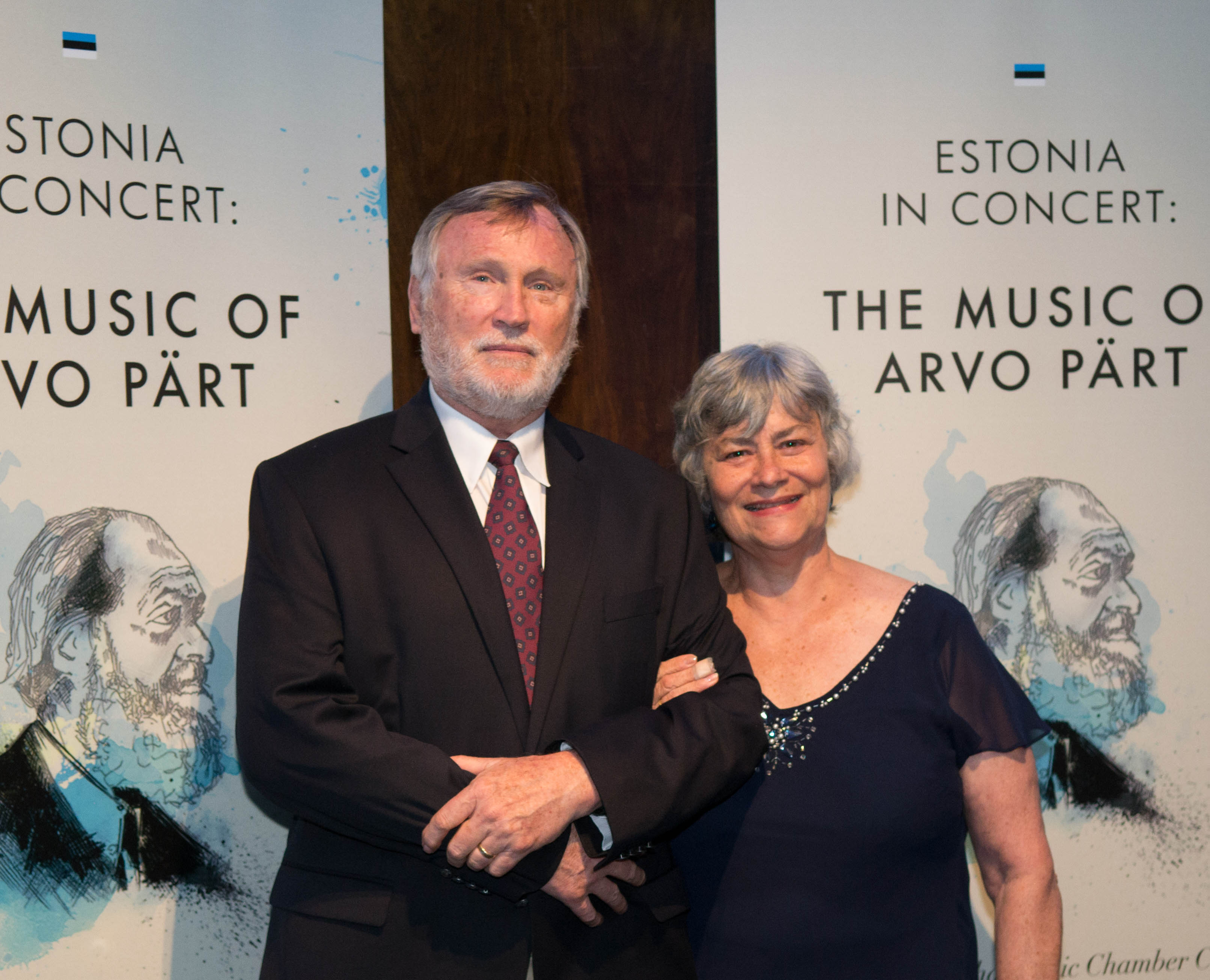
- Priit and Rima Vesilind in 2014
- Born: Priit Juho Vesilind; 4 January 1943; Tallinn, German-occupied Estonia
- Died: 3 November 2023 (aged 80); Manassas, Virginia, United States
- Occupations: Author, photojournalist
- Years active: 1965–2023
- Spouse: Rima Vesilind
- Awards: Order of the White Star, Third Class (Estonia), 2001

Priit Juho Vesilind (4 January 1943 – 3 November 2023) was an Estonian-born American senior writer and photojournalist of National Geographic magazine and an author of nonfiction.

== Early life and education ==
Vesilind was born during World War II in Tallinn, Estonia, then under German occupation as Generalbezirk Estland. His father, Paul Eduard Vesilind, was an engineer for an automobile manufacturer and his mother, Aino Vesilind (née Rebane), worked at a bank.

In 1944, when Priit was one and a half years old, Soviet Air Forces bombers struck Tallinn and the Red Army began an attack on the city as the Soviet Union sought to drive the Germans out and reestablish its own occupation of Estonia. Aino took Priit and his brother Aarne and fled by train to Czechoslovakia. Left behind in Estonia, Paul Eduard Vesilind later traveled by ship to Danzig and rejoined his wife and children in Czechoslovakia. From there they made their way along railway tracks westward across southern Germany, carrying Priit in a wheelbarrow, subsisting on dried bread, taking cover from Allied air attacks on the German railroads, and sheltering in the haylofts of barns. As the war ended in May 1945, they encountered United States Army troops advancing into Germany and came under the custody of the United States. The family then spent over four years in a displaced persons camp in Geislingen an der Steige, West Germany, with more than 4,000 other Estonians.

In September 1949, sponsored by a Lutheran church, the family emigrated to the United States, settling in Beaver, a small town in Western Pennsylvania where he spent his childhood. He was a 1964 graduate of the liberal arts college of Colgate University, located in the town of Hamilton in Madison County, New York, earning a Bachelor of Arts in English. After graduation, he served in the United States Naval Reserve, stationed at the Naval Communications Station Hawaii and rising to the rank of lieutenant. He later earned a Master of Arts in Communications Photography from Syracuse University in Syracuse, New York.

== Career ==
After leaving the Naval Reserve, Vesilind became a reporter and editor for the Syracuse Herald Tribune, a sportswriter and editor for the Atlanta Journal in Georgia, and then the outdoor editor for the Providence Journal in Rhode Island. He joined National Geographic in 1973 and moved to the suburbs of Washington, D.C. His first major assignment at National Geographic was to travel the entire length of the Ohio River and write about his experiences as he made stops along the way. During the journey, he worked on a towboat on the river and at a coal terminal in West Virginia and sold peanuts as a vendor at Riverfront Stadium in Cincinnati, Ohio, during a Cincinnati Reds baseball game.

Vesilind's career at National Geographic spanned more than thirty years and he rose to the position of the magazine's adventure and expeditions editor and senior writer, and he served as its European specialist. During his time at National Geographic, he dived to visit the wreck of the United States Navy battleship USS Arizona at Pearl Harbor, Hawaii, where the ship had been sunk during the Japanese attack on Pearl Harbor in December 1941. He also dived in fresh water in ancient Maya caves on the Yucatán Peninsula in Mexico, took part in Inuit seal hunts, retraced the voyages of the Vikings, and participated in storm chasing in which he pursued tornadoes in ten states on the Great Plains and in the southwestern United States.

In 1980, Vesilind made a risky trip on a tourist visa to the Estonian Soviet Socialist Republic, a part of the Soviet Union, to report on life behind the Iron Curtain in his original homeland. He recounted his trip in an April 1980 National Geographic article titled "Return to Estonia" that captured the desire of Estonians to be independent once more. Finding his article inspirational, Estonians secretly passed it between themselves after its publication. Vesilind later made additional trips to the Soviet bloc, and his articles helped Americans to understand the circumstances the population of the Baltic states faced under Soviet control. A National Geographic editor told The Washington Post that his reporting made him "like a national hero in Estonia" who "helped get the word out about what was happening there" under Soviet rule, and that he made the "Estonian people feel like they had not been forgotten."

In November 1989, Vesilind received word on short notice that the Berlin Wall was about to fall, and he immediately flew to West Berlin to report on the event. He used a sledgehammer to help knock the wall down and was photographed holding a piece of it with a broad smile on his face. "I started out as one of those people potentially stuck behind the Iron Curtain. And when I witnessed that [the fall of the wall], I thought, 'My God, it's finally over,'" he said in 2007. After the wall fell, he traveled the length of the inner German border between West Germany and East Germany, and wrote about his journey in the April 1990 National Geographic article "Berlin's Ode to Joy." Asked by the editors of the magazine whether the new National Geographic atlas scheduled for publication in 1990 should represent Germany as a single country or continue to show Germany as divided — a tricky decision because the magazine would not publish another atlas for several years — he advised them based on his visit to publish the atlas with a map of a united Germany. His advice was prescient: The atlas was published in July 1990 showing a single Germany, and Germany reunified in October 1990.

In November 1998, Vesilind descended in the Russian deep-submergence vehicle Mir-1 to a depth of 4 miles (6.4 km) in the Atlantic Ocean in search of the wreck of the Imperial Japanese Navy submarine I-52, sunk by U.S. Navy forces during World War II in June 1944. He wrote about the adventure in an October 1999 National Geographic article, "The Last Dive."

After leaving National Geographic, Vesilind worked as a freelance editor, writer, and photographer, living with his wife Rima in Manassas, Virginia, United States.

== Awards ==
In 2001, then-President of Estonia Lennart Meri presented Vesilind with the Order of the White Star Third Class.

== Family ==
In 1966, Vesilind married Rima Treviño Ford. The couple had two sons, Paul and William, a daughter, Emili, and six grandchildren.

== Death ==
Vesilind died in Manassas on 3 November 2023 at the age of 80 of complications from strokes and a cranial fistula following dementia.

== Published works ==
- National Geographic on Assignment USA, Publisher: National Geographic Books (1997), ISBN 0-7922-7011-8
- Horse People, Publisher: Bökforlaget Max Ström, Stockholm (2003), ISBN 91-89204-71-9
- Eestlane Igas Sadamas—An Estonian in every Port, Publisher: Varrak, Tallinn (2004), ISBN 9985-3-0837-9
- Lost Gold of the Republic: The Remarkable Quest for the Greatest Shipwreck Treasure of the Civil War Era, Publisher: Shipwreck Heritage Press (2004), ISBN 1-933034-06-8
- Eesti Aastal 1979—Estonia in the Year 1979, Publisher: Varrak, Talllinn (2006), ISBN 9985-3-1344-5, ISBN 978-9985-3-1344-2
- The Singing Revolution, Publisher: Varrak, Tallinn (2008), ISBN 978-9985-3-1623-8
- When the Noise Had Ended—Geislingen's DP Children Remember, Publisher: Lakeshore Press (2009), ISBN 978-1-61539-531-6: Co-author Mai Maddisson
