= Annie Griffiths =

American photographer (born 1953)

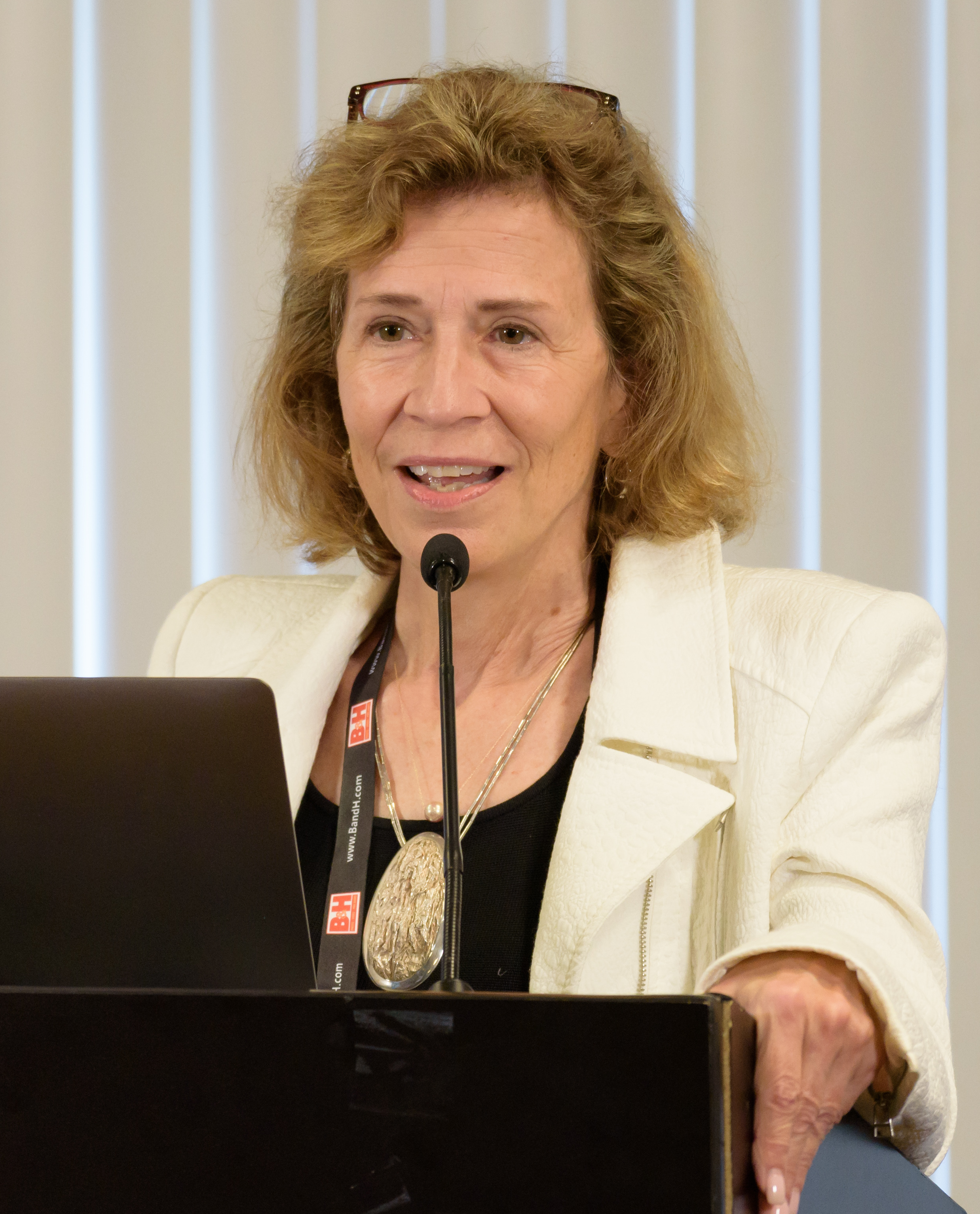
- Griffiths in 2019
- Born: 1953 (age 72–73); Minneapolis, Minnesota, U.S.
- Other name: Annie Griffiths Belt
- Occupation: Photographer

Annie Griffiths (born 1953) is an American photographer known for her work at National Geographic and a founder of Ripple Effect Images.

== Biography and career ==
Griffiths reflects on a 45-year career in a 2020 interview with the Voice of America.

Griffiths was born in Minneapolis, Minnesota. Hired at National Geographic in 1978, she was one of the first female photographers for the magazine. She is a fellow of the International League of Conservation Photographers (ILCP). She was one of the founders of Ripple Effect Images, a collective dedicated to providing storytelling resources to groups who wish to improve the lives of women worldwide.

Griffiths, a mother of two, would take her kids on worldwide assignments, one of her children visited 13 countries in utero. In 2008 she authored a book on the experiences that included such details as using diapers for packing her camera lenses. Griffiths teaches photography classes and workshops and was a visiting professor of photography at Ohio University.

She lives in Reston, Virginia, she has two kids, Lily and Charlie, and three grandkids. She is no longer married to her former husband Don Belt.

== Education ==
Griffiths graduated with a bachelor's degree in photojournalism from the University of Minnesota.

== Awards ==
Griffiths has received awards from the National Press Photographers Association, the Associated Press, the National Organization of Women, The University of Minnesota and the White House News Photographers Association. She was named one of the "Best of the Best Speakers" by the World Presidents' Association.

== Books ==
Griffiths' collaboration with Barbara Kingsolver produced a book called Last Stand: America's Virgin Lands, in 2002. Publishers Weekly, while critical of Griffiths' infrared photography, applauded the book for "capturing the essence of America the way we imagine it used to be," and continued saying "the book offers quiet evidence that there is still something better than a world where "children's adventures and glimpses of fox dwell only in books."

In 2008, she published her photo memoir, A Camera, Two Kids and a Camel, which described her life as a traveling mother with her two children. Publishers Weekly called the book, "charming and wise."

In October 2010 she edited National Geographic's archive under the theme of beauty, to create the book, Simply Beautiful Photographs.
