= Nicole Duplaix =

Nicole Duplaix (born 1943) is a French-American zoologist, ecologist, teacher, and photographer who specializes in studying otters.

== Biography ==
Duplaix first began working with otters while volunteering at the Bronx Zoo. She earned her master's degree at the University of Paris in 1966 and 1968. She later studied giant otters in South America. Over two years in this study she managed to identify 249 different individuals. She also helped Suriname officials learn how to preserve giant otters, though they still face endangerment there today and in the rest of South America.

She later returned to the University of Paris to complete her PhD. Her 1980 dissertation focused on the giant otters of Suriname's Kaboeri Creek and the phylogeny of the 13 species of otters. She also is a co-founder of TRAFFIC in 1973 which monitors the trade in wildlife worldwide. There are now over 16 TRAFFIC offices around the world which have played a major role in documenting and curbing illegal animal trade. In 1974 she created the IUCN-SSC Otter Specialist Group for the International Union of Conservation for Nature. Today the Group has over 300 members dedicated to global otter conservation.

Duplaix lives in Oregon and is a senior instructor at Oregon State University's Department of Fisheries and Wildlife.

== Awards ==
Sir Peter Scott Award for Conservation Merit (2019).
