= Rick Gore =

American writer and editor for National Geographic

- Citizenship: American
- Education: Northwestern University
- Occupations: Writer; Playwright
- Years active: 1969–Present
- Employers: National Geographic (1974–2001); Short North Stage (2010–Present)
- Known for: National Geographic articles
- Family: Christopher Gore

Rick Gore (born Richard Gore) is a former American writer, science editor and senior assistant editor for National Geographic. He is credited with nineteen cover stories with the magazine. Gore is also an executive producer of theatre and a playwright.

== Early life ==
Gore was born to Jack Gore, a former Fort Lauderdale News editor, and mother Betty Gore. He is the younger brother of the late Christopher Gore, who wrote the screenplay for the 1980 musical film, Fame, receiving an Oscar nomination for the Best Original Screenplay.

=== Education ===
Gore attended Northwestern University and received his master's degree in journalism. He also completed the John S. Knight Journalism Fellowships at Stanford in 1988

== Career ==
=== National Geographic ===
Before working for National Geographic, Gore was a reporter for Life magazine from 1969 to 1972. He joined the staff of National Geographic in 1974, where he remained until taking an early retirement in 2001.

Gore produced more than sixty feature articles, serving much of his career there as Science Editor and is credited with nineteen cover stories with the magazine.

Multiple articles were written by Gore on topics such as human evolution, for instance the August 2002 article titled "New Find", about the early expansions of hominins out of Africa. He also has written about several subjects on space such as the March 1981 article titled "When the Space Shuttle Finally Flies", about the first flight of the U.S. space shuttle orbiter.

=== Theatre ===
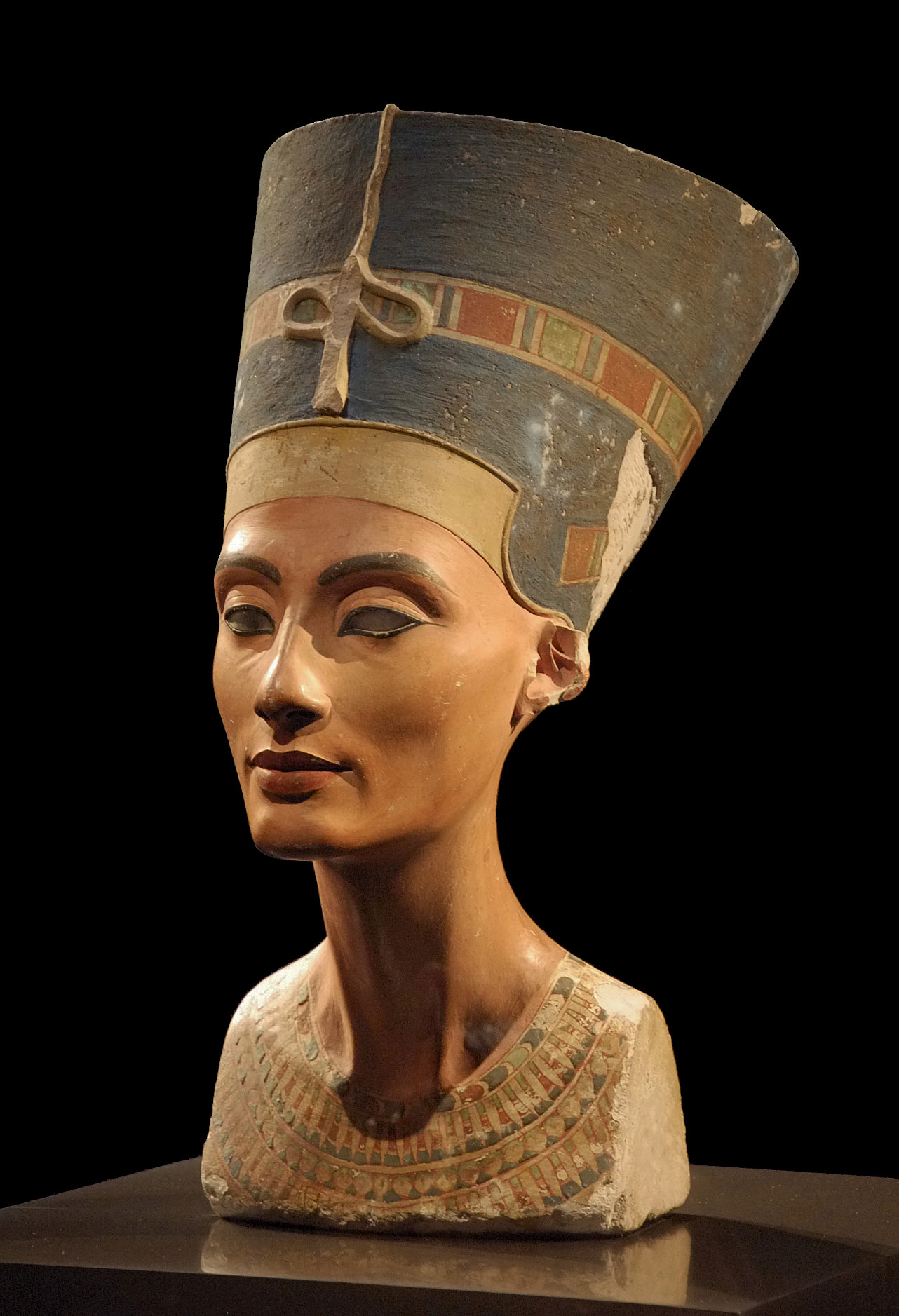
The bust of Nefertiti and the subject of Gore's 2005 play Nefertiti.

Following his brother's death in 1988 from AIDS, Gore diverted part time to theater, revising with composer David Spangler, Christopher Gore's 1977 musical Nefertiti. Several productions of Nefertiti resulted, in Key West, Chicago, Dayton, and a large scale production in Fort Lauderdale, Florida at the Parker Playhouse in 2005.

Throughout this period Gore and Spangler also worked on an original musical, Surviving the Moonlight, that was based on eight songs Christopher Gore had written for an unfinished musical based on the French film classic, Children of Paradise. Surviving the Moonlight was produced in 2022 at Short North Stage where Gore is a founding member and executive producer. Short North Stage is a theatre in Columbus, Ohio.

== Personal life ==
Gore was married to Mary Frances Whittier Gore in 1967. In 1990 Gore met his life partner Peter Yockel in Washington, D.C.. They were married in New York City in 2013.

== Bibliography ==
=== Playwright ===
- Moore, Kevin (Director). (2005). Nefertiti by David Spangler, Rick Gore and Christopher Gore [Play]. Parker Playhouse, Fort Lauderdale, Florida.
- Spangler, David (Director). (2022). Surviving the Moonlight by Rick Gore [Play]. Short North Stage, Columbus, Ohio.

=== National Geographic cover stories ===
Gore has nineteen published articles featured on the cover of National Geographic.

Cover stories
#	Title^{note}	Year	About	Location	Ref
1	Sifting For Life in the Sands of Mars	1977	Viking program	Mars	
2	Wild Nursery of the Mangroves	1977	Mangrove	Florida	
3	The Desert: An Age-Old Challenge Grows	1979	Deserts	Global	
4	Voyager Views Jupiter's Dazzling Realm	1980	Voyager program	Jupiter	
5	Journey to China's Far West	1980	Chinese culture	China	
6	When the Space Shuttle Finally Flies	1981	Space Shuttle Columbia	Florida	
7	Saturn: Riddles of the Rings	1981	Voyager program	Saturn	
8	The Once and Future Universe	1983	Universe	Outer space	
9	The Dead Do Tell Tales at Vesuvius	1984	Mount Vesuvius	Italy	
10	Our Restless Planet Earth	1985	Earth, water and fire	Global	
11	The March Towards Extinction	1989	Extinction	Global	
12	Between Monterey Tides	1990	Monterey Bay	California	
13	Dinosaurs	1993	Dinosaurs	Global	
14	Andrew Aftermath	1993	Hurricane Andrew	Louisiana Florida	
15	Neandertals	1996	Neandertals	Croatia	
16	Wrath of the Gods	2000	Earthquakes	Turkey	
17	Pharaohs of the Sun	2001	Akhenaten	Egypt	
18	The First Pioneer?	2002	Expansion of hominins	Republic of Georgia	
19	The Rise of Mammals	2003	Mammals	Global	

== Notes ==
a. In some issues of National Geographic, the cover story would have one title on the cover and a different title (with the same meaning) on the headline of the actual article, or the title may appear different on the table of contents. Titles represented in this list, are taken from the cover and the citation represents the title listed in the table of contents.
