= David Doubilet =

Underwater photographer and author

David Doubilet (born November 28, 1946) is an underwater photographer known primarily for his work published in National Geographic magazine, where he is a contributing photographer and has been an author for 70 feature articles since 1971. He was born in New York City and started taking photos underwater at the young age of 12. He started with a Brownie Hawkeye in a rubber anesthesiologist's bag to keep the water out of the camera. He lived with his family in New York City and spent summers in Elberon New Jersey exploring the Atlantic . He later worked as a diver and photographer for the Sandy Hook Marine Laboratories in New Jersey and spent much of his youth in the Caribbean as a teenage dive instructor in the Bahamas where he found his motivation to capture the beauty of the sea and everything in it. His wife is the photographer Jennifer Hayes.

== Photography ==
Doubilet's passion for underwater photography is inspired by environmentalism: "The desire to make an image that makes people think about, fall in love with, and protect the sea."

His goal as a photographer is to "redefine photographic boundaries" every time he enters the water. "We always try to add one more step, one more piece of vision, one more piece of technology. Where technology meets dreams, you make photographs," he explained during a 2011 interview. "How can I illustrate this? How can I make this picture something more than what we see, something more exciting and put it on the page that incorporates the poetry, and the environment, and the atmosphere of a place that you're shooting? I think that that's the biggest challenge."

In order to capture underwater wildlife, he takes several cameras, lenses and underwater strobes (flash systems) on each of his trips, primarily Nikon digital SLRs with ultra wide angle and Micro (macro) lenses, Sea & Sea strobes and SeaCam housings. Doubilet was one of the pioneers of underwater photography in respect to the split field image technique also called over/under images that include elements both above and below water in a single image, with both rendered in focus. This calls for an ultra wide angle lens used at a small aperture in a housing with a dome (not flat) port.

Doubilet graduated from Boston University College of Communication in 1970. He is a member of the Royal Photographic Society.

He has shot nearly 70 stories for National Geographic since his first assignment in 1971 about garden eels in the Red Sea. (Some of the articles were written and illustrated jointly with wife and photographic partner Jennifer Hayes, an aquatic biologist and photojournalist specializing in natural history and marine environments). He has authored 12 books to date, including David Doubilet: Water Light Time (Phaidon Press, 2016) which includes images made over the past 25 years. Doubilet's most recently published major assignment - completed with Jennifer Hayes - was a photo shoot in Cuban waters, which was published as Changing Cuba: The Caribbean's Crown Jewels, in the November 2016 issue of the magazine. The locations of other significant assignments over the past few years include the Great Barrier Reef, the Gulf of Mexico and the Gulf of St. Lawrence.

David Doubilet and Jennifer Hayes live in the small town of Clayton, New York in the Thousand Islands area of the St. Lawrence River, where they co-own a studio and stock photography company, Undersea Images Inc. that was formed in 1999. Doubilet owns a second home in the small coastal town of Dekolder, South Africa. Working as a team they co-produce illustrated articles for National Geographic and others in addition to marketing stock photos and doing speaking engagements.

Doubilet is a founding Fellow of the International League of Conservation Photographers. He has received many awards for his works, such as The Explorers Club's Lowell Thomas Awards and the Lennart Nilsson Award for scientific photography (2001) and others from the BBC, POY, and the American Academy of Achievement's Golden Plate Award. In 2000, Doubilet was awarded an Honorary Fellowship of the Royal Photographic Society. The latter is awarded to "distinguished persons having, from their position or attainments, an intimate connection with the science or fine art of photography or the application thereof."

== See also ==
- Nature photography – Photography genre
- Underwater photography – Genre of photography
