= Chris Johns (photographer) =

American photographer (born 1951)

- Born: April 15, 1951 (age 74); Medford, Oregon, U.S.
- Occupation(s): Photographer, chief editor of National Geographic Magazine (2005–2014)

Chris Johns (born April 15, 1951) is an American photographer and former editor-in-chief for National Geographic Magazine, a role he held from January 2005 to April 2014. After an internal reorganization at the organization, in April 2014, Johns was named chief content officer of National Geographic Society. He spent many years in Africa for the magazine and is the first photographer to have been named its editor-in-chief. He started his journalism career at daily newspapers.

== Biography ==
Prior to becoming the Beyond Yellowstone Program leader of the National Geographic Society, Johns served as executive director of the Society's Centers of Excellence and chief content officer, overseeing the expression of National Geographic's editorial content across various media platforms. He was the ninth editor-in-chief of National Geographic from January 2005 to April 2014. During his editorship, Johns' focus on excellence in photography, cartography and reporting was recognized with 63 nominations, resulting in 23 National Magazine Awards from the American Society of Magazine Editors. In 2008, Johns was named Magazine Editor of the Year, and in 2011 National Geographic was named Magazine of the Year.

Born in Medford, Oregon, United States, Johns began his career in photojournalism when he joined the Topeka Capital-Journal as a staff photographer in 1975; in 1979 he was named National Newspaper Photographer of the Year. In 1983, after three years on the Seattle Times as a staff member, he embarked on a freelance career and worked for Life, Time and National Geographic magazines. Johns became a National Geographic contract photographer in 1985 and joined the magazine staff in 1995.

Before taking over as National Geographic's editor-in-chief, Johns served as senior editor for illustrations and as associate editor. As a photographer, he produced more than 20 articles for National Geographic, eight of which were cover stories. His defining images are of Africa and its wildlife. He has taken readers down the Zambezi River, examined the Bushmen's ongoing struggle for cultural survival and provided important documentation of Africa's endangered wildlife. He was named one of the world's 25 most important photographers by American Photo magazine in 2003.

Johns' books include Valley of Life: Africa's Great Rift (1991), Hawaii's Hidden Treasures (1993) and Wild at Heart: Man and Beast in Southern Africa (2002). The forward for Wild at Heart: Man and Beast in Southern Africa was written by Nelson Mandela. He wrote the foreword for In Focus: National Geographic Greatest Portraits (2004) and the introduction to the National Geographic book 100 Days in Photographs: Pivotal Events That Changed the World (October 2007).

== Education ==
Johns was awarded an honorary doctorate from Indiana University in 2010. He studied photojournalism at the University of Minnesota and holds a bachelor's degree in technical journalism with a minor in agriculture from Oregon State University.

== Personal life ==
He lives in the Blue Ridge Mountains of Virginia with his wife Elizabeth, his daughters Noel and Louise, and his son Tim.
