= Jim Brandenburg (photographer) =

American photographer (1945–2025)

- Born: November 23, 1945; Luverne, Minnesota
- Died: April 4, 2025 (age 79)
- Education: Minnesota West Community and Technical College
- Occupation: Photographer

Jim Brandenburg (November 23, 1945 – April 4, 2025) was an American environmentalist and nature photographer and filmmaker based near Ely, Minnesota. His career included over 10 years as a newspaper photojournalist, over 30 years as a contract photographer for the National Geographic Society, and commissions from such groups as the United States Postal Service, NHK, and the BBC.

Brandenburg attended Minnesota West Community and Technical College, then called Worthington Junior College. He worked as a part-time photographer at the Worthington Daily Globe, with future author and conversationist Paul Gruchow, and later returned to the newspaper as a full-time employee. Brandenburg valued his work at the Globe, because of editors' willingness to put art and photographs at the forefront of the newspaper.

Jim Brandenburg was a Fellow of the International League of Conservation Photographers.

Brandenburg died April 4, 2025, at the age of 79.

== Recognition ==
In 1991, for his work with the Wolf Ridge Environmental Learning Center, his creation of the Concerts for the Environment non-profit organization, his work with the Nature Conservancy, and other achievements, Brandenburg was awarded the Global 500 Environmental World Achievement Award. This United Nations sponsored recognition was presented to him by the King of Sweden Carl XVI Gustaf.

In 2006 Brandenburg was awarded an honorary degree, Doctor of Humane Letters, by the University of Minnesota Duluth.

Four of Brandenburg's images were chosen for inclusion in a collection that represents the 40 most important nature photographs of all time. The Top Forty nominations include the work of 25 photographer. The images selected were: Oryx on Namib Desert, Namibia, southwest Africa; Gray Wolf near BWCAW, Ely, Minnesota; Leaping Arctic wolf, Ellesmere Island, Canada; and Bison on Frozen Landscape, Blue Mounds State Park, Luverne, Minnesota. They were chosen by members of the International League of Conservation Photographers (iLCP).

Brandenburg's image of the leaping Arctic wolf was named one of 100 most important photos in Canadian history and was included in the book 100 Photos that Changed Canada.

== Publications ==
Title	ISBN	Date Published
White Wolf: Living With an Arctic Legend	ISBN 0-942802-95-0	1988
Minnesota: Images of Home	ISBN 9991161295	1990
Brother Wolf: A Forgotten Promise	ISBN 1-55971-210-4	1993
To the Top of the World: Adventures with Arctic Wolves	ISBN 0-8027-8219-1	1993
Sand and Fog: Adventures in Southern Africa	ISBN 0-8027-7476-8	1994
American Safari: Adventures on the North American Prairie	ISBN 0-8027-8319-8	1995
Scruffy: A Wolf Finds His Place in the Pack	ISBN 0-8027-8445-3	1996
Chased By The Light: A 90-Day Journey	ISBN 1-55971-671-1	1998
Looking for the Summer	ISBN 1-55971-838-2	2003
Face to Face with Wolves	ISBN 1-4263-0242-8	2008
