= List of National Geographic cover stories (2000s) =

National Geographic logo

National Geographic is an American magazine that is noted for its cover stories and accompanying photography. Throughout the 2000s National Geographic's cover stories showcased global historical events such as the 1906 San Francisco earthquake and Hurricane Katrina. Cover stories included articles written by notable writers such as David Quammen, Peter Hessler and Andrew Marshall. Cover photos were published by notable photographers such as Élisabeth Daynès, Kenneth Garrett and Ira Block.

The 2000s saw articles written and photographed at locations around the globe featuring wildlife like the June 2001 issue titled "Asia's Last Lions", written and photographed by Mattias Klum with a photo on the cover of a lion cub. Articles featured on the cover of the magazine also included human-interest stories such as "Africa's Ragged Edge", written by Paul Salopek and photographed by Pascal Maitre featuring a turbaned horseback rider in the April 2008 issue. Many geographical locations were featured including Yellowstone National Park in the August 2009 article "Yellowstone Supervolcano", written by Joel Achenbach with photographs by George Steinmetz.

In the April 2007 issue, Fen Montaigne wrote the cover story titled "Saving the Sea Bounty", about the dangers that marine life face. The photo on the cover of the magazine featured a swordfish caught in a net, photographed by Brian Skerry.

== 2000 ==
2000
Title^{a}	Date	Author	Photographer	Images^{b}	Ref
Celebrations of Earth and Beyond...	January 2000	Joel Achenbach	NASA	Hubble Space Telescope image	
Orphan Gorillas	February 2000	Michael McRae	Michael Nichols	Baby gorilla	
Madidi	March 2000	Steve Kemper	Joel Sartore	Macaws	
Inside the Great White	April 2000	Peter Benchley	David Doubilet	Great white shark	
In Search of Vikings	May 2000	Priit Vesilind	Sisse Brimberg	Icelander bonfire	
Indus: Clues to an Ancient Civilization	June 2000	Mike Edwards	Randy Olson	Egret headdress	
Wrath of the Gods	July 2000	Rick Gore	Reza	Stone statue of Antiochus I	
Sydney: Olympic City	August 2000	Bill Bryson	Griffiths Belt	Sydney Opera House	
Rana Tharu	September 2000	Staff writer^{d}	Éric Valli^{c}; Debra Kellner^{c}	Rana Tharu woman	
Wild Gliders of Borneo	October 2000	Tim Laman	Tim Laman	Wallace's flying frog	
Libya	November 2000	Andrew Cockburn	Reza	Muammar Gaddafi	
Polar Bears: New Cubs on the Ice	December 2000	Norbert Rosing	Norbert Rosing	Baby polar bear	

== 2001 ==
2001
Title^{a}	Date	Author	Photographer	Images^{b}	Ref
2001: The Body in Space	January 2001	Arthur C. Clarke	Ira Block	Space suit prototype	
Jewel Scarabs	February 2001	Ronald D. Cave	David Hawks	Jewel scarab	
Extreme Africa	March 2001	David Quammen	Michael Nichols	Mandrill	
Pharaohs of the Sun	April 2001	Rick Gore	Kenneth Garrett	Akhenaten	
Marco Polo: Venice to China	May 2001	Mike Edwards	Michael Yamashita	Muslim woman	
Asia's Last Lions	June 2001	Mattias Klum	Mattias Klum	Lion cubs	
Grizzly: Cornered	July 2001	Douglas H. Chadwick	Joel Sartore	Grizzly bear	
Public Lands Are Going Public	August 2001	John G. Mitchell	Melissa Farlow	Woman at Burning Man	
How Old is it?	September 2001	Zahi Hawass	Bill Ellzey	Egyptian pyramid	
Tracking the Leopard	October 2001	Kim Wolhuter	Kim Wolhuter	Leopard	
Russia: Ten Years After	November 2001	Fen Montaigne	Gred Lugwig	Russian man	
Abraham: Father of Three Faiths	December 2001	Tad Szulc	Rembrandt	The Sacrifice of Isaac	

== 2002 ==
2002
Title^{a}	Date	Author	Photographer	Images^{b}	Ref
Wolf to Woof	January 2002	Karen E. Lange	Robert Clark	Wolf; Dog	
Etna Ignites	February 2002	Marco Pinna	Carsten Peter	Mount Etna erupting	
Diamonds: The Real Story	March 2002	Andrew Cockburn	Cary Wolisnky	Diamonds	
Found	April 2002	Cathy Newman	Steve McCurry	Sharbat Gula	
The Race to Save Inca Mummies	May 2002	Guillermo A. Cock	Ira Block	Incan mummy	
Untold Stories of D-Day	June 2002	Thomas B. Allen	Mark Thiessen	USS Corry's American flag	
Bald Eagles: Majesty in Motion	July 2002	John L. Eliot	Norbert Rosing	Bald eagle	
The First Pioneer?	August 2002	Rick Gore	Mauricio Antón	Early Hominid skull	
Meerkats Stand Tall	September 2002	Tim Clutton-Brock	Mattias Klum	Meerkat	
Death on the Nile	October 2002	A.R. Williams	Kenneth Garrett	Maya	
Unmasking Skin	November 2002	Joel Swerdlow	Sarah Leen	Realistic face mask	
The Magic of Snowy Owls	December 2002	Lynne Warren	Daniel J. Cox	Snowy owl	

== 2003 ==
2003
Title^{a}	Date	Author	Photographer	Images^{b}	Ref
Inside Egypt's Secret Vaults	January 2003	Zahi Hawass	Kenneth Garrett	Death mask	
Discovering the First Galaxies	February 2003	Ron Cohen	Ralf Kahler; Tom Abel	Star formation	
Dinosaurs	March 2003	Joel Achenbach	Robert Crark	Tyrannosaurus skull	
The Rise of Mammals	April 2003	Rick Gore	Robert Clark	Mother and child	
Life and Death on Everest	May 2003	Sir Edmund Hillary	Yousuf Karsh	Sir Edmund Hillary	
Unearthing Siberian Gold	June 2003	Mike Edwards	Sisse Brimberg	Gold stag	
Divided Korea	July 2003	Tom O'Neil	Michael Yamashita	South Korean soldier	
Hidden Tribes of the Amazon	August 2003	Scott Wallace	Nicolas Reynard	Matis tribesman	
Zebras!	September 2003	Andrew Cockburn	Anup and Manoj Shah^{c}	Zebras	
Kingdom on Edge: Saudi Arabia	October 2003	Frank Viviano	Reza	Mishaal bin Abdulaziz Al Saud	
Guardian of the Sun God's Treasure	November 2003	Alain Zivie	Kenneth Garrett	Egyptian tomb wall	
The Future of Flying	December 2003	Michael Klesius	Joe McNally	F-22 Raptor	

== 2004 ==
2004
Title^{a}	Date	Author	Photographer	Images^{b}	Ref
Mars: Is There Life in the Ancient Ice?	January 2004	Oliver Morton	Kees Veenenbos	Mars	
Great Whites of the North	February 2004	John L. Eliot	Norbert Rosing	Polar bears	
Harp Seals: The Hunt for Balance	March 2004	Kennedy Warne	Brian Skerry	Harp seal pup	
Chasing Tornados	April 2004	Priit Vesilind	Carsten Peter	Tornado	
Change of Heartland	May 2004	John G. Mitchell	Jim Richardson	Boy and his dogs	
The End of Cheap Oil	June 2004	Tim Appenzeller	Sarah Leen	Rush hour traffic	
Sun Bursts	July 2004	Curt Suplee	SOHO; EIT; ESA; NASA	Solar flare	
The Heavy Cost of Fat	August 2004	Roff Smith	Karen Kasmauski	Obesity	
Global Warming	September 2004	Daniel Glick	Peter Essick	Alaska wildfire	
Red Hot Hawaii	October 2004	Jennifer S. Holland	Frans Lanting	Puʻu ʻŌʻō lava flow	
Was Darwin Wrong?	November 2004	David Quammen	Robert Clark	Jamaican lizard	
Searching the Stars for New Earths	December 2004	Time Appenzeller	Dana Berry	Moon and a planet	

== 2005 ==
2005
Title^{a}	Date	Author	Photographer	Images^{b}	Ref
Why We Love Caffeine	January 2005	T. R. Reid	Bob Sacha	A cup of coffee	
The Great Grey Owl	February 2005	Lynne Warren	Daniel J. Cox	Great grey owl	
What's In Your Mind	March 2005	James Shreeve	Cary Wolinsky	Brain sensors	
Lost World of the Little People	April 2005	Mike Morwood; Thomas Sutinka; Richard Roberts	Kenneth Garrett^{c}; John Gurche^{c}	A new species of Hominid	
Poison: 12 Toxic Tales	May 2005	Cathy Newman	Cary Wolinsky	Tarantula	
The New Face of King Tut	June 2005	A.R. Williams	Kenneth Garrett^{c}; Élisabeth Daynès^{c}	Re-creation of King Tut	
Stem Cells	July 2005	Rick Weiss	Max Aguilera-Hellweg	Dyed stem cell cluster	
After Oil: Powering the Future	August 2005	Michael Parfit	Sarah Leen	Vintage gas pumps	
Africa: Whatever You Thought, Think Again	September 2005	David Quammen	WorldSat	Africa	
The Next Killer Flu	October 2005	Tim Appenzeller	Lynn Johnson	Kanta Subbarao	
The Secrets of Living Longer	November 2005	Dan Buettner	David Mclain	Yoga handstand	
Sea Monsters	December 2005	Virginia Morell	DamnFX	Prehistoricsea monster	

== 2006 ==
2006
Title^{a}	Date	Author	Photographer	Images^{b}	Ref
Our Grandest Canyon	January 2006	Virginia Morell	John Burcham	Toroweap Overlook	
Love: The Chemical Reaction	February 2006	Lauren Slater	Pablo Corral Vega	A couple embracing	
The Greatest Journey Ever Told	March 2006	James Shreeve	Chris Johns	Juǀʼhoansi peoples	
Quake: The Next Big One	April 2006	Joel Achenbach	UC Berkeley	1906 earthquake	
Selling Alaska's Frontier	May 2006	Joel K. Bourne Jr.	Joel Sartore	Polar bear	
Why the World Loves Soccer	June 2006	Sean Wilsey	William Albert Allard	Young football player	
Panda, Inc.	July 2006	Lynne Warren	Michael Nichols	Mei Xiang and her cub	
Killer Hurricanes	August 2006	Ernest J. Gaines	Ray Sterner; Steve Babin	Hurricane Katrina	
China Rising	September 2006	Brook Larmer	Fritz Hofmann	Model worker statue	
Places We Must Save	October 2006	Lynne Warren	Michael Melford	Glen Canyon	
Found: Earliest Child	November 2006	Christopher P. Sloan	Kennis & Kennis	Early Hominid baby	
Saturn as You've Never Seen It	December 2006	Bill Douthitt	NASA/JPL	Saturn	

== 2007 ==
2007
Title^{a}	Date	Author	Photographer	Images^{b}	Ref
Amazon: Forest to Farms	January 2007	Scott Wallace	Alex Webb	Farm in Pará	
Healing the Heart	February 2007	Jennifer Kahn	Robert Clark	Heart	
Defending a Forgotten Herd	March 2007	Michael Fay	Michael Nichols	Elephants	
Saving the Sea Bounty	April 2007	Fen Montaigne	Brian Skerry	Swordfish in a net	
Jamestown: The Real Story	May 2007	Karen E. Lange	British Museum	Native Americans	
The Big Thaw	June 2007	Paul Nicklen	James Balog	Iceberg meltwater	
Malaria	July 2007	Michael Finkel	David Scharf	Mosquito	
Mya: How a Great Culture Rose and Fell	August 2007	Guy Gugliotta	Simon Norfolk	Temple of the Great Jaguar	
Islam's Fault Line: Pakistan	September 2007	Don Belt	Reza	Pakistani pilgrim	
Growing Fuel	October 2007	Joel K. Bourne Jr.	Robert Clark	Corn	
Memory: Why We Remember, Why We Forget	November 2007	Joshua Foer	Maggie Steber^{c}; Rebecca Hale^{c}	Photographs	
Big Bad Bizarre Dinosaurs	December 2007	John Updike	DamnFX	Pachycephalosaurus	

== 2008 ==
2008
Title^{a}	Date	Author	Photographer	Images^{b}	Ref
Indonesia's Ring of Fire: Volcano Gods	January 2008	Andrew Marshall	John Stanmeyer	Mount Merapi	
The Black Pharaohs	February 2008	Robert Draper	Gregory Manchess	Taharqa	
Inside Animal Minds	March 2008	Virginia Morell	Vincent J. Musi	Border Collie	
Africa's Ragged Edge	April 2008	Paul Salopek	Pascal Maitre	Turbaned riders	
China: Inside the Dragon	May 2008	Peter Hessler	Rob Harrell	Chinese jade dragon	
Secrets of Stonehenge	June 2008	Caroline Alexander	Ken Geiger	Stonehenge	
Who Murdered the Mountain Gorillas	July 2008	Mark Jenkins	Brent Stirton	Gorilla	
Ancient Iran	August 2008	Marguerite Del Giudice	Simon Norfolk	Stone relief of a Royal guard	
Where Food Begins	September 2008	David Quammen	Mark Thiessen	Soybean plant	
The Other Humans: Neanderthal Revealed	October 2008	Stephen S. Hall	Joe McNally	Neanderthal woman	
The End of Night: Why We Need Darkness	November 2008	Verlyn Klinkenborg	Jim Richardson	Chicago nightscape	
The Real King Herod	December 2008	Tom Mueller	Michael Melford	Masada	

== 2009 ==
2009
Title^{a}	Date	Author	Photographer	Images^{b}	Ref
Gold	January 2009	Brook Larmer	Robert Clark	Gold facial	
What Darwin Didn't Know	February 2009	David Quammen	Mattias Klum	Ololygon littoralis	
Saving Energy: It Starts at Home	March 2009	Robert Kunzig	Tyrone Turner	Infrared photo of a house	
The She-King of Egypt	April 2009	Chip Brown	Kenneth Garrett	Hatshepsut	
Ice Baby: Secrets of a Frozen Mammoth	May 2009	Tom Mueller	Francis Latreille	Baby mammoth	
The Christian Exodus from the Holy Land	June 2009	Don Belt	Ed Kashi	Deir Mar Musa	
Angkor	July 2009	Richard Stone	Robert Clark	Ta Prohm	
Yellowstone Supervolcano	August 2009	Joel Achenbach	George Steinmetz	Grand Prismatic Spring	
Before New York: Rediscovering the Wilderness of 1609	September 2009	Peter Miller	Markley Boyer; Robert Clark	Manhattan with trees	
The Tallest Trees	October 2009	Joel K. Bourne	Michael Nichols	Redwood trees	
Egypt's Animal Mummies	November 2009	A.R. Williams	Richard Barnes	Egyptian mummified cat	
Are We Alone?	December 2009	Timothy Ferris	Dana Berry	Planet Gliese 581e	

== See also ==
- National Geographic
- National Geographic Society
- List of National Geographic cover stories

== Notes ==
a. In some issues of National Geographic, the cover story would have one title on the cover and a different title (with the same meaning) on the headline of the actual article, or the title may appear different in the table of contents. Titles represented in this list are taken from the cover and the citation represents the title listed in the table of contents.
b. Images could also be a painting, drawing or a computer rendering.
c. Although two photographers are credited, it is not stated to which one took the photo.
d. Uncredited author: No author associated with article.
