= Consuming Spirits =

- Film poster
- Directed by: Chris Sullivan
- Written by: Chris Sullivan
- Produced by: Chris Sullivan
- Cinematography: Chris Sullivan
- Edited by: Chris Sullivan
- Release date: 12 December 2012 (New York City)
- Running time: 136 minutes
- Country: United States
- Language: English

Consuming Spirits is a 2012 American animated drama film directed by Chris Sullivan in his directorial debut. Partially autobiographical, the film was released on December 12, 2012 in New York City and employs a diverse mixture of different animation styles to tell the stories of three different characters and the anguish they face in their everyday lives.

== Synopsis ==
The movie follows the lives of three residents of the fictional town of Magguson, all of whom work at the town's newspaper, The Daily Suggester. While at first the interactions between the three people appear to show a superficial working relationship between them, as the movie progresses the viewer learns that there is a deeper relationship between them all and that all of them have hidden secrets.

== Cast ==
- Nancy Andrews as Gentian Violet (voice)
- Chris Sullivan as Victor Blue (voice)
- Judith Rafael as Mother Beatrice Elastica (voice)
- Mary Lou Zelazny as Ida Blue (voice)
- Chris Harris as Peabody Shampling (voice)
- Robert Levy as Earl Gray (voice)

== Reception ==
Critical reception for Consuming Spirits has been predominantly positive and the film holds a score of 81 on Metacritic (based on 12 reviews) and 89% on Rotten Tomatoes (based on 18 reviews). Despite this, a Swiss site reported that most of the audience left the theater during a showing at the Fantoche animated film festival in Baden, Switzerland. A reviewer for NPR recommended the film and called it "emotionally raw, thoroughly original".

=== Awards ===
- Chicago Award at the Chicago International Film Festival (2012, won)
