= Christopher P. Sloan =

American paleontologist

Christopher P. Sloan (born September 28, 1954) is an artist, science communicator, art director, author, and avocational paleontologist. He describes himself as a conceptual realist and is an advocate for Art for Our Sake, a term he uses to distinguish art with a purpose from art for art's sake. He teaches modern approaches to science art, animal anatomy, and information visualization online for the Academy of Art University in San Francisco, and the Maryland Institute College of Art (MICA). Sloan is a four-time award-winning author of children's books written for the National Geographic Society. Sloan started a science media and exhibitions company, Science Visualization, in 2010. He closed the company in 2021 to pursue his art interests. He served as executive director of the Allegany Arts Council in Cumberland, Maryland from 2014 to 2018. He was appointed to the Maryland State Arts Council by Maryland Governor Larry Hogan in 2021.

== Background ==
In the 1970s, Sloan studied zoology at Oregon State University, became a freelance graphic designer and scientific illustrator, and attended art and design classes in New York City at several prominent schools including, Pratt Institute, Parsons School of Design, and National Academy of Design. From 1981- 1989, Sloan was Art Director at the Financial Executives Institute and designed Financial Executive magazine. From 1989 to 1992, he held the same position at Changing Times magazine, which he later redesigned as Kiplinger’s Personal Finance Magazine.

In 1992, Sloan joined National Geographic Magazine as one of its four art directors. In 1994, Sloan became the chief Art Director and served as the Senior Editor for archaeology and paleontology. In 2007 he left the Art Department to start a new department where he was Director of Mission Projects, a liaison role between the magazine and the National Geographic Society's research grantees. While at National Geographic, Sloan was responsible for conceiving most of the stories about paleontology and archaeology and art directed much of the art that appeared in those stories. He wrote two feature articles, including a cover story about the discovery of a juvenile Australopithecus afarensis in Ethiopia, “The Origin of Childhood.” Sloan left National Geographic in 2010.

In 1999, Sloan published a feature article called “Feathers for T. Rex?” for National Geographic Magazine, which continued the magazine's coverage of the dinosaurian origin of birds. The article contained information about a fossil called Archaeoraptor that Stephen A. Czerkas (d. 2015) was studying in Blanding, Utah. A photo caption in the story described the fossil found in China as "a missing link between terrestrial dinosaurs and birds that could actually fly." It was discovered later that the fossil, illegally exported from China, was a forged composite fossil of a new dinosaur species, Microraptor zhaoianus, and an Early Cretaceous bird. Sloan, Stephen A. Czerkas (d. 2015), and his wife, Sylvia Czerkas were instrumental in convincing the American owners of the fossil to return it to China.

In 2003, Sloan was selected to be a distinguished member of the EXPOSÉ Advisory Committee by the Computer Graphics Society. He is a four-time winner of the National Science Teacher Association and Children's Book Council “Outstanding Science Trade Book” award (2012, 2006, 2005, 2002).

After leaving National Geographic, Sloan co-authored, with Dr. Rick Potts, the exhibition companion book for the opening of the Smithsonian National Museum of Natural History's Koch Hall of Human Origins, "What Does It Mean to Be Human?"

In 2010, Sloan founded Science Visualization with anthropologist Dr. Christina Elson. The firm focuses on creating and promoting content related to science, environment, history, art and design through exhibitions, television, digital media, and books. Sloan was the chairman of the Lanzendorf Paleo-Art Committee of the Society of Vertebrate Paleontology from 2007 to 2013. He won the Lanzendorf Prize for Digital Modeling and Animation in 2014.

Sloan is a lifelong artist, but began his career as a professional artist in 2019. In 2019 he was a fellow at the Hopkins Extreme Materials Institute Extreme Arts program, a program run in conjunction with MICA.

== Projects and Fieldwork ==
While Art Director as well as paleontology and archaeology editor at National Geographic, Sloan traveled to numerous field sites and worked with many researchers. Projects included a series called "The Human Story," and stories on ancient cultures, such as the Maya, ancient Chinese dynasties, and ancient Egypt. Sloan was involved in orchestrating the reconstructions of numerous three-dimensional models for the magazine. These included Ötzi the Iceman, the australopithecine AL-444-2, and Homo floresiensis all by paleoartist John Gurche; the australopithecine Selam by the Kennis brothers; and Pharaoh Tutankhamun by Élizabeth Daynès. He led the reconstruction of the Bonampak murals with Dr. Mary Miller and artist Doug Stern. In 2007, he led an editorial team on a 2,500-mile road-trip through Iran, which resulted in a National Geographic cover story on ancient Iran.

While working with Editor-in-Chief Bill Allen, Sloan led National Geographic's coverage of paleontology. This included the magazine's close following of the Dinosaur Renaissance and the dinosaur-bird hypothesis. Sloan was responsible for National Geographic being the first mass media to show photos of the feathered dinosaurs Sinosauropteryx, Caudipteryx, Sinornithosaurus, and Beipiaosaurus. He led National Geographic's efforts to support scientists in revealing the feather colors of Anchiornis huxleyi, the second dinosaur to have this distinction.

Sloan participated in paleontological fieldwork in Alberta, Canada, and Xinjiang, China. In 2004, while on a dig in western China led by Xu Xing and James Clark, Sloan discovered the fossilized remains of a new genus of prehistoric crocodile, which now bears the name Junggarsuchus sloani. On the same expedition Sloan discovered the fragmentary remains of Kryptodrakon progenitor, the earliest and most primitive pterodactyloid.

== Art ==
Sloan describes himself as a conceptual realist. He is a leading advocate of "Art for Our Sake," which he describes as art that has a purpose. Specifically, he suggests that in a time of global crises, the role of artists should be to direct their talents toward raising public awareness and realizing change. This is in sharp distinction to an "art for art's sake" perspective which he sees as a Victorian era construct used to encourage an anti-science or anti-progress perspective. His artwork as fellow at the Hopkins Extreme Materials Institute Extreme Arts program focused on conceptual explorations of molecular or subatomic interactions. His 2020 solo show, Salient Points: Thoughts on the Future of Humanity, included his work from the Extreme Arts program and also focused on the mass extinction crisis and technology.

== Gallery and Studio ==
In 2024, Sloan and Elson purchased a building at 47 Baltimore Street in Cumberland, Md. to create the Arcadian Gallery. The Arcadian Gallery opened in late May 2025 after extensive renovations. Arcadian Gallery has a sister business, The Arcadian, at the same address, which offers imported wines and light snacks. The theme of the artwork and aesthetic of the Arcadian Gallery is nature.

The Arcadian Gallery features a mixture of local art and art from nationally-known, or internationally-known artists. These include Mauricio Antón, Raul Martín, Carel Pieter Brest van Kempen, Peep Ainsoo, Zoe Fitchet, Terry Miller, Kim Diment, and Chris Bacon.

The Arcadian Gallery held its first competition and show, the American Wildlife Art Competition and Exhibition, in October of 2025. The juror was wildlife artist Carel Pieter Brest van Kempen. Its second show was Vanishing Point, the Art of Logan Hartlaub, a local biologist and bird enthusiast. In May 2026, the Arcadian Gallery opened The Appalachian Nature Art & Photography Competition and Exhibition, which featured Appalachian nature-themed art and photography from artists and photographers living in West Virginia, Virginia, Pennsylvania, Maryland, and Washington, D.C.. The juror for photography was Steven David Johnson and the juror for art was Terry Miller. Ten percent of the gallery sales proceeds from these exhibitions was donated to a conservation cause.

Sloan has a studio at the Arcadian Gallery where he paints in oils. The gallery and wine bar hours are Thursday through Saturday from 2 pm to 8 pm.

== Selected publications (books) ==
- Baby Mammoth Mummy: Frozen in Time: A Prehistoric Animal's Journey into the 21st Century (2011), ISBN 9781426308659 (Winner, 2012 National Science Teacher Association and Children's Book Council “Outstanding Science Trade Book”)
- What does it mean to be Human? (2010), written with Dr. Rick Potts, ISBN 9781426206061
- Mummies: Dried, Tanned, Sealed, Drained, Frozen, Embalmed, Stuffed, Wrapped, and Smoked...and We're Dead Serious (2010), ISBN 9781426306952
- Bizarre Dinosaurs: Some Very Strange Creatures and Why We Think They Got That Way (2008), written with Drs. James Clark and Cathy Forster, ISBN 9781426303302
- How Dinosaurs Took Flight: The Fossils, the Science, What We Think We Know, and Mysteries Yet Unsolved (2005), written with Dr. Xu Xing, ISBN 9780792272984 (Winner, 2006 National Science Teacher Association and Children's Book Council “Outstanding Science Trade Book”)
- The Human Story: Our Evolution from Prehistoric Ancestors to Today (2004), written with Drs. Meave and Louise Leakey, ISBN 9780792263258 (Winner, 2005 National Science Teacher Association and Children's Book Council “Outstanding Science Trade Book”)
- Bury The Dead: Tombs, Corpses, Mummies, Skeletons & Ritual (2002), written with Dr. Bruno Frolich, ISBN 9780439555852
- SuperCroc and the Origin of Crocodiles (2002), written with Dr. Paul Sereno, ISBN 9780792266914 (Winner, 2003 National Science Teacher Association and Children's Book Council “Outstanding Science Trade Book”)
- Feathered Dinosaurs (2001), written with Dr. Phillip Currie, ISBN 9780439262828
