= Michael Melford =

Michael Melford may refer to:

- Michael Melford (journalist), English sports journalist
- Michael Melford (photographer), American photographer
- Michael Melford (rugby union), English rugby union player
