= Mary Lou Zelazny =

American painter

Mary Lou Zelazny (b 1956, Chicago, IL, USA): American painter and educator. Adjunct Professor in the Department of Painting and Drawing at the School of the Art Institute of Chicago (SAIC), 1990-present.

== Biographical background ==
Zelazny was born in the Logan Square neighborhood in Chicago and was primarily raised by her mother and Polish immigrant maternal grandmother. Her father, a Polish national, immigrated to America as a WW2 displaced person. He was kidnapped (ca.1944) in the Nazi Heuaktion program of child abduction, enslavement and forced labor, which affected many tens of thousands of Polish and Ukrainian children.

Zelazny’s life in a community of recent immigrants and displaced persons resulted in certain ambivalences; do I reject or embrace my origins? The Chicago northwest-side Polish children of migrants were often subject to cruel ethnic jokes, degrading stereotypes and mockery of their ‘foreign’ styles of dress, unfamiliar food and anomalous self-presentation that did not conform to approved 50s American cultural homogenization. This inspired Zelazny’s early interest in ‘bad’ aesthetics, low-brow culture and the adoption of ironic, against the grain styles of eccentric fashions and faux pretensions of affluence. These directions also led to an interest in unfashionable genres of art-making. Her attitudes were also strongly influenced by her immigrant grandmother, who embodied a rural central European thrift linked to a joyous instinctive creativity, wherein all manners of American cast-off objects were reconfigured into original home decor and other decorative experiments.

== Education ==
While still in high school, Zelazny was enrolled in the Young Artists Program at the School of the Art Institute of Chicago (SAIC). After matriculating as a Bachelor of Fine Art (BFA) student she gravitated towards old master techniques and pre-modern art historical subjects. She studied under Bauhaus-influenced professors Elizabeth Rupprecht and Richard Keane. Alfred Jakstas, head conservator at the Art Institute of Chicago, mentored her in historical painting technique which at the time was becoming overlooked in the academy. Other influential faculty painters were Ray Yoshida, Tony Phillips, Frank Piatek, Barbara Rossi, Elizabeth Ockwell, Hollis Sigler and Karl Wirsum, who all had passionate and unconventional teaching styles that emphasized individuality and self-discovery. Zelazny was awarded a BFA from SAIC in 1980.

== Early work: 1980–1989 ==
After graduating, Zelazny primarily worked in a two dimensional format of mixed media, collage (usually derived from print sources), and oil and/or acrylic paint. She was influenced by the 80’s bricolage movement and her work from this period was allegorical and often referenced faux historical tableaux and reimagined canonical genre paintings. Frequent themes from this period depict the instruments, devices and concatenations of technological stuff that was exponentially proliferating during the expanding consumer society of 80s America.

History of Tools, an exhibition of 14 collage-paintings by Zelazny, all from 1987, was shown at Peter Miller Gallery in Chicago and was reviewed by Artforum in the February 1988 issue. In 1989, an extensive fire destroyed an entire city block – bordered by the Chicago north-side streets Huron, Sedgwick, Orleans and Superior. The River North Fire totally incinerated nine art galleries and many other properties. The entirety of Zelazny’s work stored at the Peter Miller Gallery was burned. No artwork was recoverable and subsequent litigation for fair compensation was widely perceived as inadequate.

In 1989, Chicago's MCA hosted Chicago Artists in the European Tradition. Curated by Lynne Warren, the exhibition featured 55 works by 10 contemporary Chicago artists, including Zelazny, and ran from February 25-April 9, 1989.

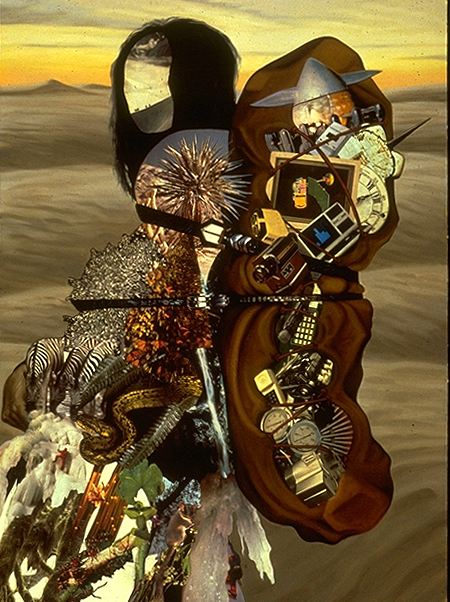
Amazon Papoose, 1988, oil, collage, panel, 48" x 35"

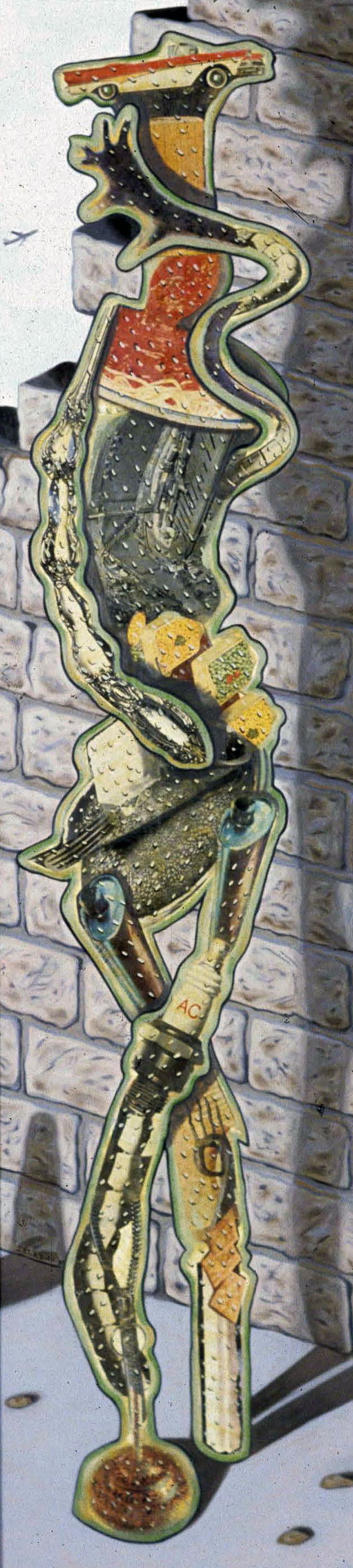

== Mid-career: 1990–2015 ==
To review Zelazny’s oeuvre over several decades reveals a mind that will not tolerate stasis. Her interests evolve and change in creative cycles that may span months or years. The paintings pair historical motifs and influences with contemporary concerns or aesthetic experiments originating from inchoate impulses. Some themes explored during this period are allegories on women, underwater fantasy seascapes involving women, ritualistic dance and watercraft that visit the Narrenschiff motif. Her ‘eyed tree’ series combines monoprint fragments as collage elements to produce large plein air landscapes.

In 2009, the first retrospective dedicated to the work of Mary Lou Zelazny, Altogether Mutable, was presented in Chicago, Illinois. Curated by Allison Peters Quinn, Director of Exhibitions at Hyde Park Art Center, this exhibition presented a comprehensive selection of Zelazny's work featuring over 70 collaged paintings and paint studies made between 1980 and 2008.

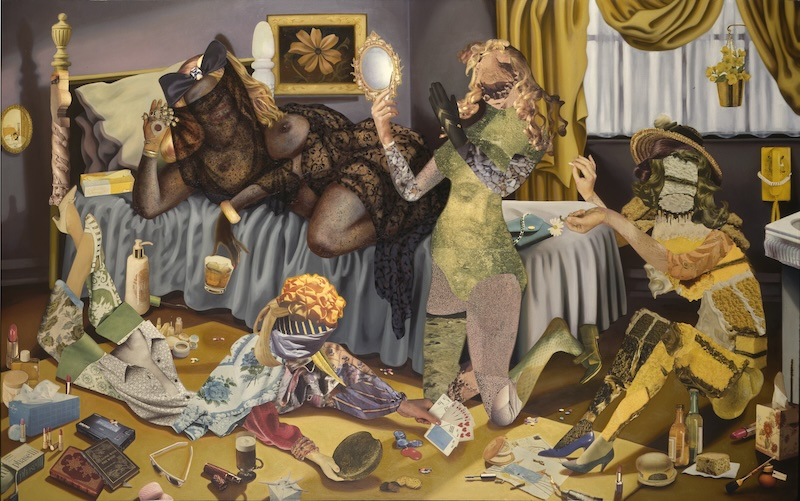
The Slumber Party, 1991, oil, collage on canvas, 55.5" x 89"

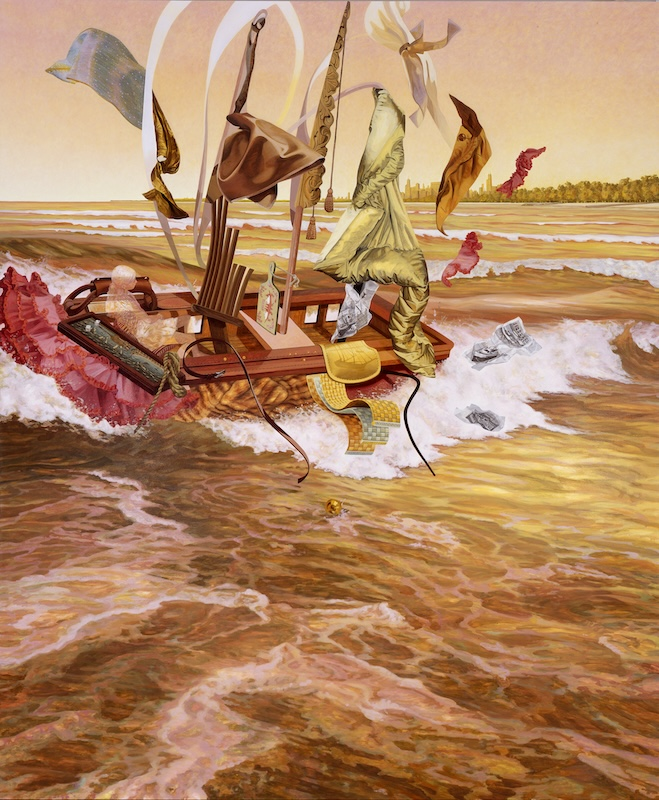
I Heart I Go, 2007, acrylic, collage on canvas, 107" x 88"

== Current work: 2016–2026 ==
Well into her fourth decade of continuous art production, Zelazny continues to combine collage techniques and acrylic and/or oil paint to invent allegories, multi-figure narratives, still life, and landscapes that reflect pre-modern painting influences and thematic preoccupations with modern life and existence often larded with varying degrees of humor and irreverence. Her work has changed over the decades with an increased use of decalcomania, composed of monoprint collage elements that inject a spontaneous and abstract quality to the completed work. Significant categories of work from this period are large scale tree paintings, still life work, a twenty painting series exploring the nocturnal phantasms that accompany insomnia, a series of eleven large portraits of fictitious accomplished women, and several paintings that resurrect characters from earlier work where new and old combine to depict a bizarre reunion.

The solo exhibition Mary Lou Zelazny: Rendezvous was presented at Zolla/Lieberman Gallery in Chicago from January 9 through February 7, 2026. The Koehnline Museum of Art on the Des Plaines campus of Oakton College will present a solo exhibition, Mary Lou Zelazny: Spontaneous Generation, from May 13 through June 25, 2027.

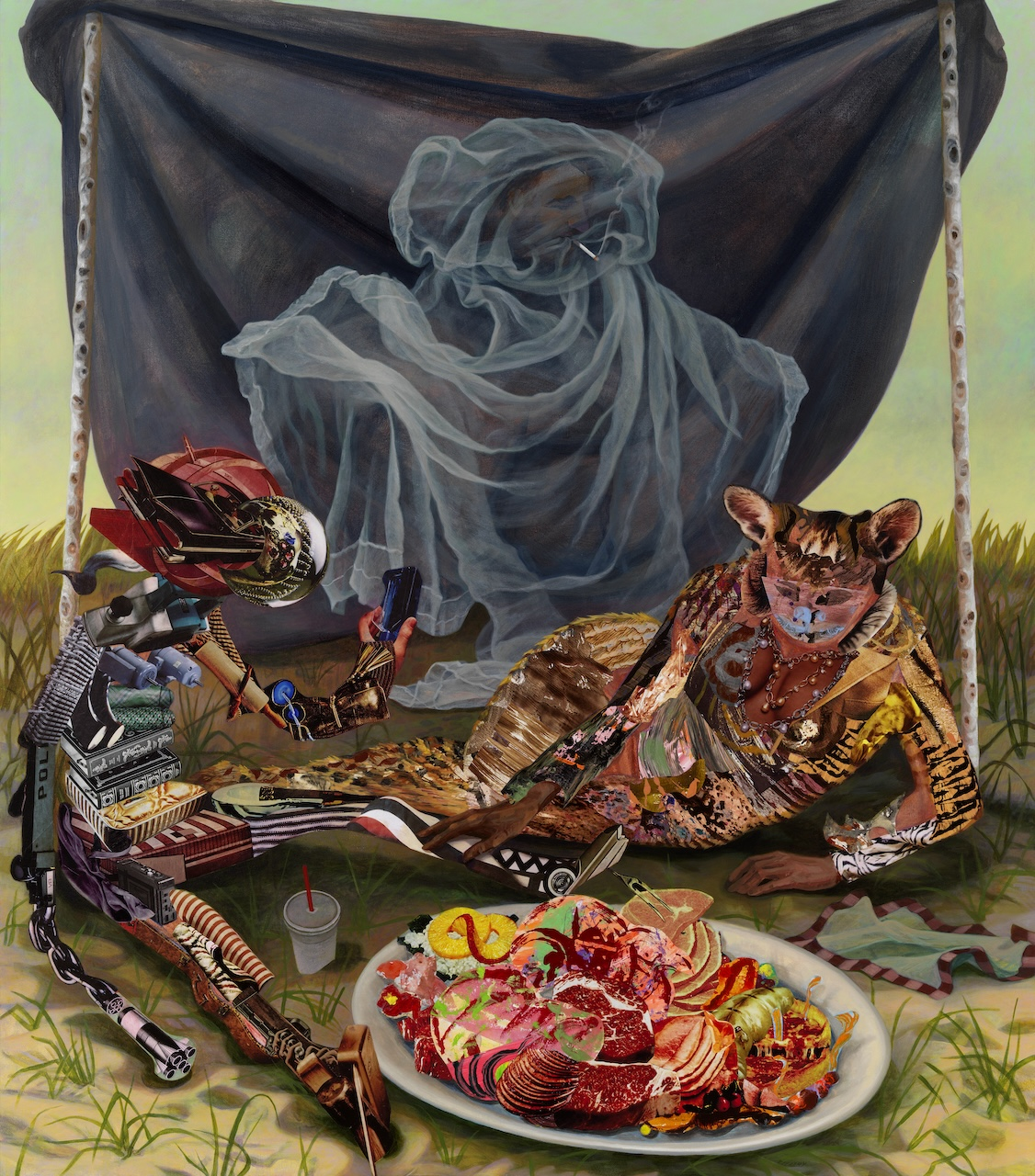
Under the Tarpaulin, 2024, acrylic, oil and collage on canvas, 62” x 54”

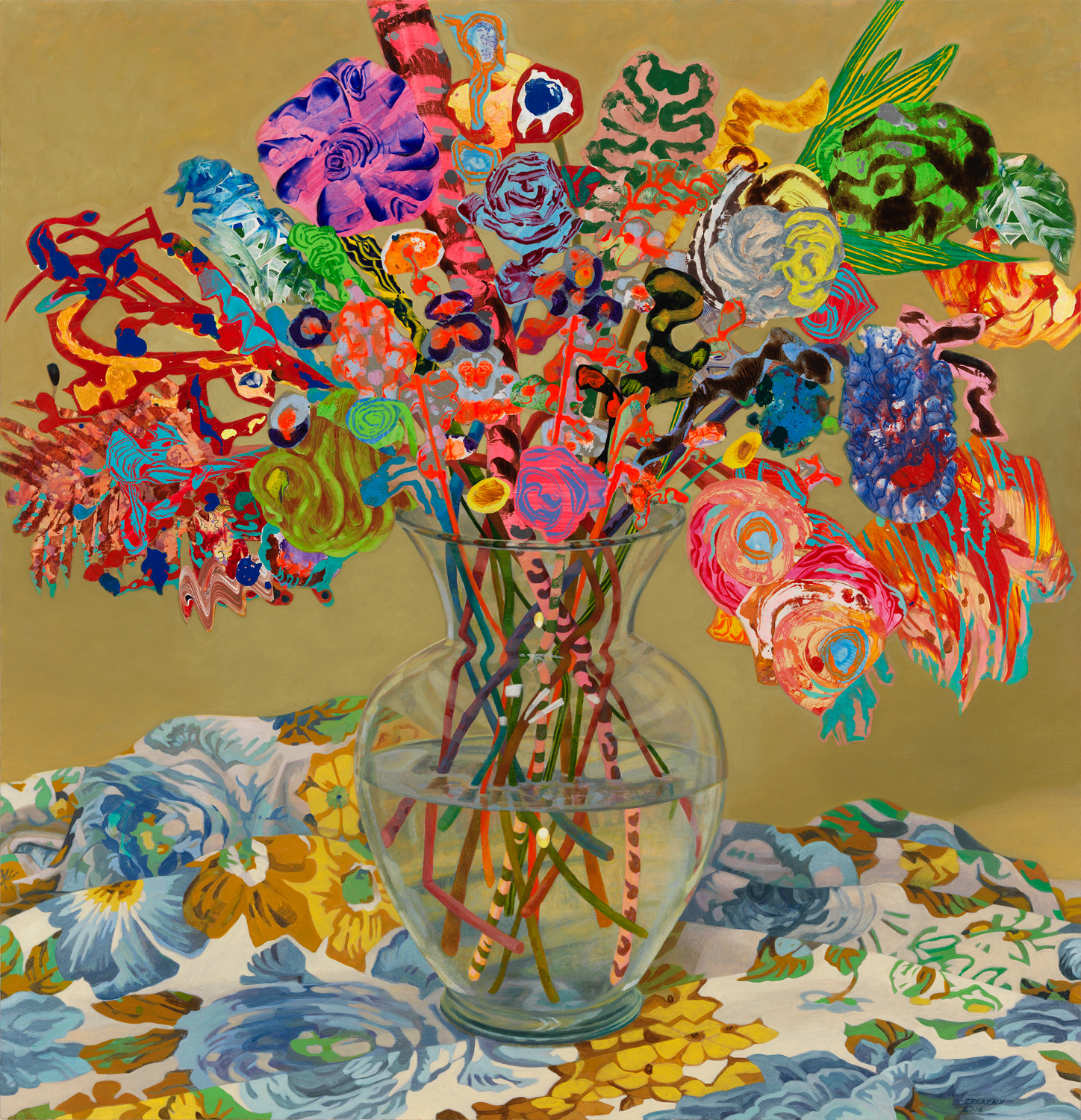
Blushing Shoots, 2016, acrylic, collage, oil on canvas, 48" x 46"

== Further research ==
As of 2026, Zelazny continues her interests in studio practice, gallery exhibition and art education. Her curriculum vitae, updated information on her artistic activities and a comprehensive overview of her past and current artwork can be seen at www.marylouzelazny.com

== Public collections ==
- City of Chicago Public Art Collection: 19th District Chicago Police Department
- Elmhurst College Art Collection, Elmhurst, Illinois
- First Chicago Bank, Chicago
- Kemper National Insurance Companies
- The Museum of Contemporary Art, Chicago
- Nagin and Associates, Miami, FL
- Prudential Insurance Company, Newark, NJ
- Rockford Art Museum, Rockford, IL
- The Elmhurst Art Museum, Elmhurst, IL
- Weichman and Associates, Munster, IN
- The McCormick Place Art Collection, Chicago IL
