= Montclair Kimberley Academy =

School in Montclair, New Jersey, US

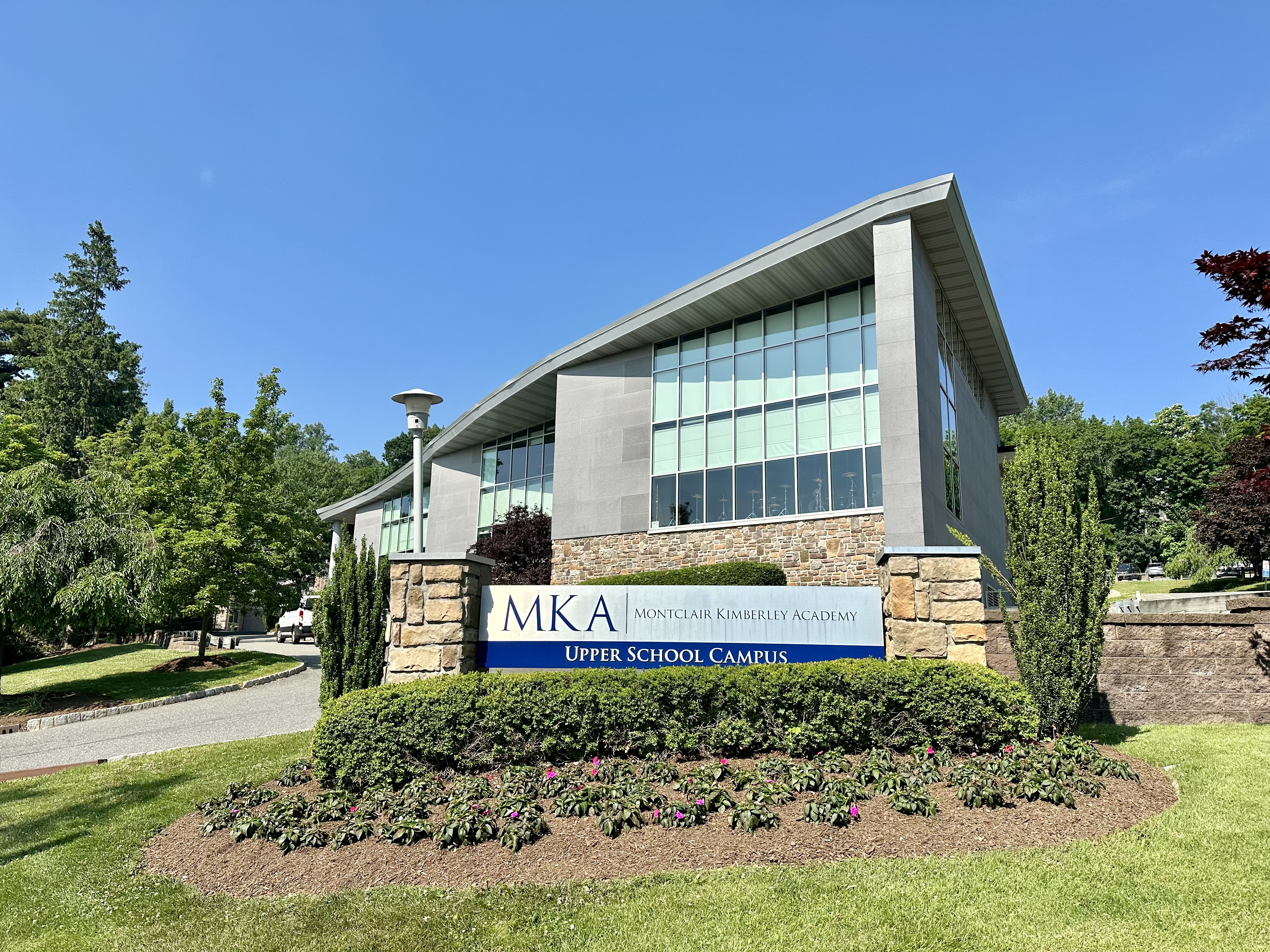

Location
- 201 Valley Road; Montclair, Essex County, New Jersey 07042; United States
- 40.821477°N 74.226614°W

Information
- Type: Private, coeducational
- Motto: Knowledge, Vision, Integrity
- Established: 1974
- NCES School ID: X0869116
- Head of school: Nigel D. Furlonge
- Faculty: 171.4 FTEs
- Grades: PreK–12
- Enrollment: 1,034 (plus 31 in PreK, as of 2023–24)
- Student to teacher ratio: 6:1
- Colors: Green, blue, and white
- Athletics conference: Super Essex Conference
- Team name: Cougars
- Accreditation: Middle States Association of Colleges and Schools
- Newspaper: The Academy News
- Endowment: $47 million
- Tuition: $48,550 (grades 9-12 for 2023-24)
- Signature programs: Character Education; The MKA Core; Writing Challenge; May Term; Global Experience Program; 1:1 technology
- Awards: 2013–15 Apple Distinguished School; 2003 National School of Character Award
- Website: mka.org

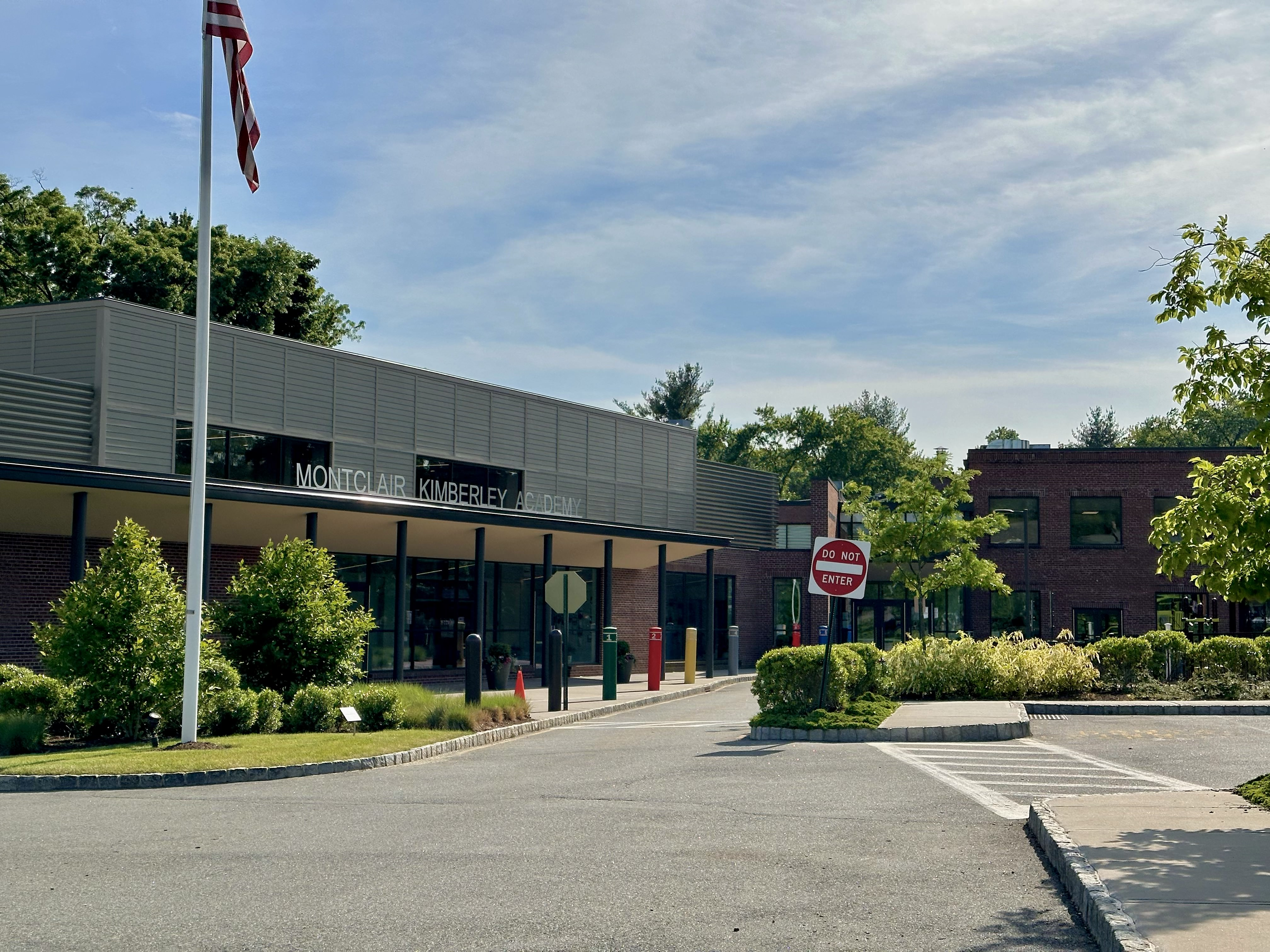
Brookside campus (MKA's primary school)

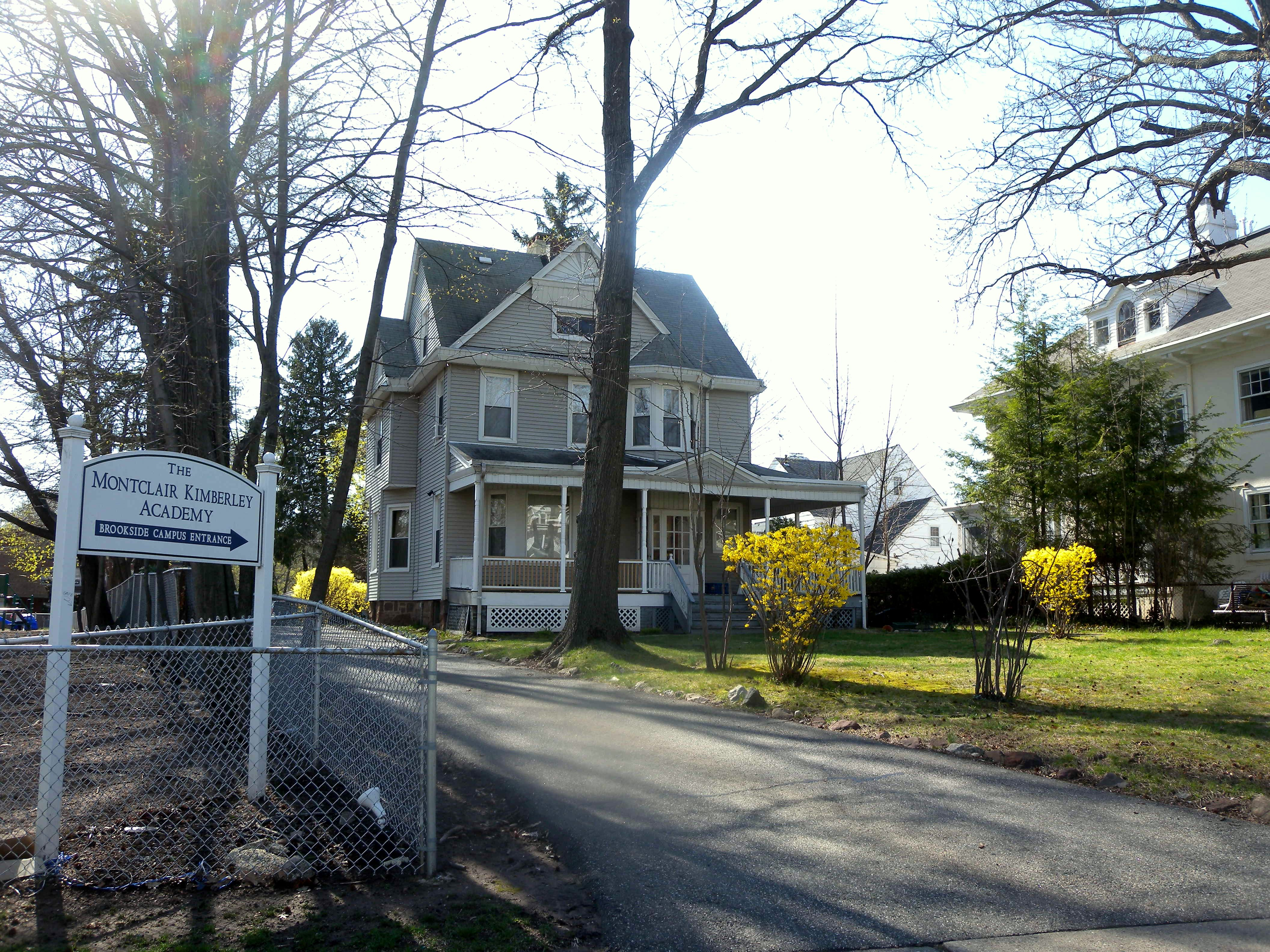
Brookside campus

Montclair Kimberley Academy (MKA) is a co-educational private school for students in pre-kindergarten through twelfth grade located in Montclair in Essex County, in the U.S. state of New Jersey. The school was established in 1974 as the result of the merger of three separate schools: Montclair Academy, a boys' school founded in 1887; The Kimberley School, a girls' school founded in 1906; and Brookside, a coed school founded in 1925.

As of the 2023–24 school year, the school had an enrollment of 1,034 students (plus 31 in PreK) and 171.4 classroom teachers (on an FTE basis), for a student–teacher ratio of 6:1.

The school has been accredited by the Middle States Association of Colleges and Schools Commission on Elementary and Secondary Schools since 1987 and is accredited until January 2025.

== History ==
Montclair Academy was founded in 1887 by a group of local citizens, as a college preparatory school for boys with an enrollment of 32 boys. In 1891, the school expanded to include a boarding facility and was renamed the Montclair Military Academy, though the name reverted to Montclair Academy after the end of the First World War. By 1925 the enrollment was close to 300 boys. The school was owned and run at that time by Dr. Walter Head.

Kimberley Academy was founded in 1906 as Miss Waring's School and Studio. The enrollment in the first year was 46 students, with 10 teachers led by Mary Kimberley Waring. In 1909, Mary Jordan joined Waring as co-principal, and the school was renamed The Kimberley School. The two women ran the school for profit for more than 30 years, until it incorporated as a nonprofit institution in 1941.

Brookside School was founded in 1925 by a group of local parents, as a progressive, coeducational primary school. Enrollment that first year was 30 students, with six teachers.

During the 1930s, all three schools suffered declines in enrollment, but the schools expanded again in the post-World War II era. In 1950, a group of trustees of Montclair Academy purchased the Brookside School in order to create a co-ed feeder for the academy. The Kimberley School also purchased and renovated the old Montclair Athletic Club. In 1963 Montclair Academy purchased land for a new campus, which today houses the MKA Upper School (grades 9-12), while the old Montclair Athletic Club houses the MKA Middle School (grades 4-8).

In 1968, Montclair Academy and The Kimberley School began to merge, offering cross-registration for classes and shared social events. In 1974, the two schools were combined as Montclair Kimberley Academy.

=== Principals ===
- John MacVicar, first principal of Montclair Academy (1887-?)
- Mary Kimberley Waring, first principal of Kimberley School (then Miss Waring's School and Studio) (1906-1941)
- Mary Jordan, co-principal of Kimberley School (1909-1941)
- Walter Head, owner and headmaster of Montclair Academy (1920s)
- Richard Ward Day, first principal of MKA (1968-1979)
- Frances R. O'Connor (1979-1991)
- Peter R. Greer (1992-2005), headmaster.
- Thomas W. Nammack (2005- )

== Curriculum ==
MKA offers a college prep curriculum featuring Signature Programs in Ethics, Writing, and the MKA Core – works of western and non-western literary, artistic, musical, historical or mathematical significance. Each graduating senior is required to complete May Term. Choices for May Term include internships and travel opportunities in Europe and Asia. French and Spanish are offered from Pre-K onwards; Latin and Chinese in 6th grade. The school has advanced technology, science labs supporting research-based learning, four gymnasiums, a swimming pool, auditoriums, a black box theatre, and the Upper School both a $3 million arts wing and a multimillion-dollar academic and technology wing. There is an interscholastic athletic program, and fields competitive teams in over 25 sports that have won over 100 championships in the past 10 years. Students have access to fine and performing arts opportunities ranging from a tri-campus Strings Program, to mounting a full Shakespeare production in 7th grade, to making movies in the Upper School. Numerous community service opportunities exist at each campus, as well as extensive extracurricular offerings. 100% of students go on to college, with an 87% acceptance rate to one of their first three colleges of choice.

The school is a member of the New Jersey Association of Independent Schools.

== Campus ==
MKA has three academic campuses: Brookside (the primary school), the middle school, and the upper school.

=== Middle School campus ===
The Middle School houses students in grades 4–8. The building was formerly the Kimberley School, prior to the MA–TKS merger in 1974. Educational facilities include a gymnasium, auditorium, and library. Outdoor facilities include a tennis court, playground, and turf field, which houses the Upper School baseball and softball teams, and the Middle School baseball, softball, soccer, and football teams.

=== Upper School campus ===
The Upper School, formerly Montclair Academy, houses students in grades 9–12. Educational facilities include:

The Johnson Family Academic Center - A library and educational hub, opened in January 2016. It consists of 3 collaborative study rooms, a quiet study, a technology center, an idea lab classroom, and general seating. The center earned a LEED Silver Certification in 2017. A green roof on top of the Johnson Family Academic Center has a garden, composter, weather station, and learning space for students.

Peter R. Greer Arts Center - A 15,000-square-foot (1,400 m^{2}) arts wing. It houses the Weiss auditorium, art and photography studios, and an orchestral band room.

Deetjen Theatre - A blackbox theatre that hosts the school's fall and spring plays.

Fairleigh S. Dickinson Gymnasium - The Upper School's main gymnasium. Opened in 1968, it consists of a basketball court, weight room, trainer’s room, and a pool.

Inquiry and Innovation Center - A 27,000-square-foot (2,500 m^{2}) STEM facility completed in 2025. The center contains seven science laboratories, nine math, computer science, and health classrooms, and access to a green roof. The building also houses facilities for robotics, engineering, and research.

== Awards and recognition ==
For 2013–15, MKA was recognized as an Apple Distinguished School for its use of technology in education.

In 2009, Montclair Kimberley Academy was voted Best NJ Private School by parents in Bloomberg Businessweek.

In 2010, the school was designated a Johns Hopkins School of Excellence.

In 2003, Montclair Kimberley Academy was recognized as a National School of Character by the Character Education Partnership, one of ten schools selected nationwide.

Montclair Kimberley Academy was recognized by the US Department of Education as a Blue Ribbon School for 1999–2000, and the Upper School was also recognized as a Blue Ribbon School for 1994–1996.

== Arts ==
Montclair Kimberley Academy has an extensive program for both performing and visual arts. The Fine and Performing Arts department is run by Nicole Hoppe. The school puts on four productions each academic year, including one large-scale musical. On average, up to a quarter of the student body participates in the musical in some capacity. The school additionally puts on an arts showcase in September, and one to two plays each year, in the fall and in the spring. Every other year in the spring, the play is replaced by a film made by students with the help of a professional film crew.

The department oversees the production of an arts newsletter, The Informer, published several times each semester. The Informer covers topics from current productions, to artist spotlights, and artistic opportunities and events in the community.

Each year, students are recognized for their work on stage and in the fine arts. Montclair Kimberley Academy students are frequent recipients of Scholastic Art and Writing Awards. In 2016, two students have won Rising Star Awards from the Paper Mill Playhouse.

== Athletics ==
The Montclair Kimberley Academy Cougars compete in the Super Essex Conference, which is comprised of public and private high schools in Essex County and operates under the supervision of the New Jersey State Interscholastic Athletic Association (NJSIAA). Prior to the NJSIAA's 2010 realignment, the school had previously participated in the Colonial Hills Conference which included public and private high schools covering Essex County, Morris County and Somerset County in west Central Jersey. With 335 students in grades 10-12, the school was classified by the NJSIAA for the 2019–20 school year as Non-Public B for most athletic competition purposes, which included schools with an enrollment of 37 to 366 students in that grade range (equivalent to Group I for public schools). The school was classified by the NJSIAA as Non-Public Group B (equivalent to Group I/II for public schools) for football for 2024–2026, which included schools with 140 to 686 students.

MKA's longtime rival is Newark Academy, including a notable soccer rivalry. There is also a rivalry with Montclair High School, Montclair's public high school. Some of the school's more successful athletic teams include girls' tennis, boys' tennis, boys' soccer, softball, ice hockey, golf, varsity and junior varsity baseball, boys' lacrosse, girls' volleyball, field hockey and boys cross country.

The girls fencing team was the overall state champion in 1980-1983 and 1985-1990. The program's 10 state titles and nine individual titles are both ranked second in the state.

The ice hockey team won the Gordon Cup in 1982, won the Handchen Cup in 1992, won the McInnis Cup in 2011, 2012, 2014 and 2015, and the Kelly Cup in 2023.

The boys tennis team was Non-Public B/C state champion in 1983 (defeating Mater Dei High School in the final match of the tournament), 1984 (vs. Gloucester Catholic High School), 1989 (vs. Moorestown Friends School) and 1990 (vs. Morrestown Friends). The 1984 team won the parochial state championship against Christian Brothers Academy and went on to win the overall state championship, defeating runner-up Princeton High School 4-1. The boys tennis team was the 2009 Prep B state co-champion. The team also made it to the finals of the 2007 North Non-Public B state championship where they lost to Newark Academy 3–2. The 2008 team would repeat their 2007 success by making it back to the finals of the North Non-Public B state championship in which they lost 3–2. The 2008 team also won the Colonial Hills Conference and Essex County Championships. The county tournament win was the first in the school's history.

The girls tennis team won the Non-Public B state championship in 1986 (defeating runner-up Wildwood Catholic Academy in the tournament's final round), 1990 (vs. Moorestown Friends School), 1994 (vs. Moorestown Friends), 2003 (vs. Holy Spirit High School), 2004 (vs. Holy Spirit), 2005 (vs. Moorestown Friends), 2006 (vs. Sacred Heart High School) and 2012 (vs. Gill St. Bernard's School); the program's eight state titles are tied for seventh-most in the state. The 2004 team won the Tournament of Champions against runner-up West Morris Mendham High School. The team won their fourth consecutive Parochial B state championship in 2006 and won the 2007 Colonial Hills Conference championship. The 2004 team finished the season with a 24-0 record after defeating West Morris Mendham 4-1 to win the ToC.

The baseball team has won four Prep B state titles since 1991, most recently in 2009, and six Colonial Hills Conference Championships, the most recent was in 2009 when the Cougars were named the Colonial Hills Conference Co-Champions. The MKA baseball has also won three Non Public B North crowns, in 1997, 2002 and 2009. In 2002 the Cougars were led by Frank Herrmann who pitched in MLB for the Cleveland Indians. The Cougars' head baseball coach since 1991, Ralph Pacifico, won his 300th game in 2007. In 2009 MKA Baseball captured both the conference title and the Prep B championship. Pacifico was named Coach of the Year in the Colonial Hills Conference. On June 2, 2009, MKA defeated St. Mary of Rutherford by a score of 7–3 to win the North Non-Public B crown and clinch a spot in the overall state title game.

The boys fencing team won the overall state championship in 1993.

The softball team won the Non-Public B state championship in 1999 (defeating Sacred Heart High School in the tournament final), 2000 (vs. St. Joseph High School of Hammonton), 2002 (vs. Gloucester Catholic High School), 2004 (vs. Sacred Heart), 2005 (vs. Holy Spirit High School), 2006 (vs. Gloucester Catholic), 2007 and 2009 (vs. St. Joseph - Hammonton both years). The eight state championships is tied for second-most among schools in the state and the 10 finals appearances are the fourth most, while the streak of four consecutive titles from 2004 to 2007 is tied for second longest. The 1999 team finished the season with a 24-6 record after winning the Parochial B title with a 5-0 win in the championship game against Sacred Heart. The 2007 team finished the season with a record of 21-6 after winning the Non-Public B state title with a 2-0 win against St. Joseph of Hammonton by a score of 2-0 in the championship game. The team won ten straight Colonial Hills Conference championships from 1999 to 2008.

The girls swimming team won the Non-Public Group B state championship in 2000 and 2001.

The field hockey team won the North I Group I state sectional championship in 2001 and 2012. In 2009, the team was NJSIAA Prep B state champions with a 2–1 win over Stuart Country Day School. In the 2005–06 season the MKA Wrestling team won their first Prep B state championship in the history of the school.

The boys soccer team won the Non-Public Group B state championship in 2006 (against Wildwood Catholic High School in the finals of the tournament), 2011 (vs. Gill St. Bernard's School) and 2012 (vs. Gill St. Bernard's) The boys' soccer team were Prep B State Champions and NJSIAA sectional finalists, and won North Parochial B and overall Non-Public B championship in 2006, the school's first-ever wins in the tournament. The 2007 and 2009 teams also won the Prep B state championship. The 2011 team finished the season with a 21–2–2 record, winning the Prep B state championship and earning the NJSIAA Non-Public B state championship with a 1–0 overtime win against Gill St. Bernard's School.

The Cougars' boys' lacrosse team won the 2007 Prep B state title, ending Morristown-Beard School's five-year win streak.

The girls' volleyball team won the 2006 and 2007 Colonial Hills Conference Championship. The Cougar volleyball coach Mike Tully was also recently named the 2008 New Jersey State Coach of the year.

In 2007, the team had a 19–1 record, winning the 2007 Colonial Hills Conference Championship, came in 2nd in the 2007 Essex County Tournament and won the 2007 Prep B state championship. The MKA golf team finished the 2010 season as Parochial Non Public B State Champions and NJISAA Prep B state champions.

In 2008, Coach Tony Jones led the boys' basketball team to the school's first Prep B championship for the sport, defeating Collegiate School 82–59. Kyrie Irving, who was a Sophomore at the time, became the school's second 1,000 point scorer two days earlier in the semi-final game against top seeded and defending champion Solomon Schechter. In 2010, they were named SEC Independence Division Champions.

The boys lacrosse team won the Non-Public Group B state championship, defeating Pingry School in the tournament final.

MKA boys cross country through 2014–2017 won four consecutive Prep B state championships, including a Non-Public B championship in 2014 and top 3 finishes in 2015 and 2017. This dominance not matched nearly by any other MKA sports program was led by coach Thomas Fleming until his death in the spring of 2017 where he suffered from a heart attack during a track meet. He later died at the hospital.

The girls soccer team finished the 2017 season with a 17-4-5 record, after winning the Non-Public Group B state title as co-champion with Moorestown Friends School after a 3-3 tie in the finals of the tournament.

The girls spring / outdoor track team won the Non-Public B state championship in 2021.

== Notable alumni ==
- Virginia Hamilton Adair (1913–2004, class of 1929), poet and educator
- Kerry Bishé (born 1984), actress (her father taught at MKA)
- Spruille Braden (1894–1978, class of 1910), U.S. Ambassador to Colombia (1939–42), Cuba (1942–45), Argentina (1945)
- Jessica Bruder, journalist who writes about subcultures and teaches narrative writing at Columbia Journalism School
- Robert L. Clifford (1924–2014, class of 1942), New Jersey Supreme Court justice
- Bob Cottingham (born 1966, class of 1984), Olympic fencer who competed in the sabre events at the 1988 and 1992 Summer Olympics.
- Jim Courter (born 1941), represented New Jersey in the United States House of Representatives from 1979 to 1991.
- Fairleigh Dickinson Jr. (1919–1996, class of 1937), President of Becton, Dickinson & Co.
- Lewis Williams Douglas (1894–1974, class of 1912), U.S. Ambassador to Great Britain (1947–50).
- Wayne Dumont (1914–1992), politician who served in the New Jersey Senate from 1951 to 1990 (with a two-year gap).
- Hal Ebersole (1899–1984), American football guard who played one season for the Cleveland Indians of the National Football League.
- Theodore Miller Edison (1898–1992), only child of his inventor father who graduated from college; went on to become an inventor with over 80 patents.
- Philip L. Fradkin (1935–2012; class of 1953), author and Pulitzer Prize-winning journalist.
- Tom Galligan (born 1955, class of 1973), lawyer, legal scholar, administrator and educator who is currently the dean and professor of law of Louisiana State University's Paul M. Hebert Law Center.
- Homer Hazel (1895–1968), football player and coach who became one of the inaugural inductees into the College Football Hall of Fame in 1951.
- Frank Herrmann (born 1984), Major League Baseball pitcher for the Cleveland Indians.
- Tim Howard (born 1979), former United States men's soccer team and Everton goalkeeper
- George Hrab (born 1971; class of 1989), musician, podcaster, orator and author
- Whip Hubley (class of 1975), actor who appeared in Top Gun.
- Kyrie Irving (born 1992, transferred), professional basketball player for the Dallas Mavericks.
- Charles Samuel Joelson (1916–1999), lawyer and politician who served as the Representative for New Jersey's 8th congressional district from 1961 to 1969.
- Jim Johnson (born 1960, class of 1979), politician, attorney and community activist, who was formerly an Assistant Secretary of the Treasury and Under Secretary of the Treasury for Enforcement.
- Elizabeth Jones (born 1935, class of 1953), Chief Engraver of the United States Mint from 1981 to 1991.
- Sean Jones (born 1962), NFL defensive end and Super Bowl XXXI Champion (MKA '80).
- Garret Kramer (class of 1980), author and performance coach.
- Lisa Lindahl (born 1948), writer, artist, activist and inventor.
- Ellen Malcolm (born 1947, class of 1965), founder of EMILY's List.
- Charlie Nothing (1941–2007, class of 1959), musician, musical instrument maker and writer.
- Peter N. Perretti Jr. (1931–2016; class of 1949), Attorney General for the State of New Jersey, Academy Trustee.
- Michael J. Pollard (1939–2019), actor best known for playing the character C. W. Moss in the 1967 crime film Bonnie and Clyde.
- Dan Seymour (1914–1982), radio and television announcer who performed in the 1938 The War of the Worlds radio drama of a Martian invasion.
- Polly Smith (born 1949), designer, inventor and creator of the sports bra, who was a costume designer for The Muppet Show and Sesame Street.
- Thomas Stockham (1933–2004, class of 1951), scientist who developed one of the first practical digital audio recording systems.
- Isaiah J. Thompson (born 1995), jazz pianist, bandleader and composer
- Dallas Townsend (1919–1995, class of 1936), CBS News journalist.
- Brandon Uranowitz (born 1986), stage and screen actor best known for his roles as Adam Hochberg in the musical An American in Paris and as Mendel Weisenbachfeld in the 2016 Broadway revival of Falsettos.
- Michael Wolff (born 1953, class of 1971), writer and journalist best known his book Fire and Fury.
- Michael Yamashita (born 1949, class of 1967), photographer known for his work in National Geographic and his multiple books of photographs.

== Notable faculty ==
- Richard W. Day (1916–1978), principal of Montclair Academy who was the 10th principal of Phillips Exeter Academy.
- Thomas Fleming (1951–2017), winner of the New York City, Tokyo, Cleveland International, and Los Angeles marathons.

== Alumni Association Awards ==
Every year, the Alumni Association awards a notable MA, TKS or MKA alum the Distinguished Alumni Award.
