= Garret Kramer =

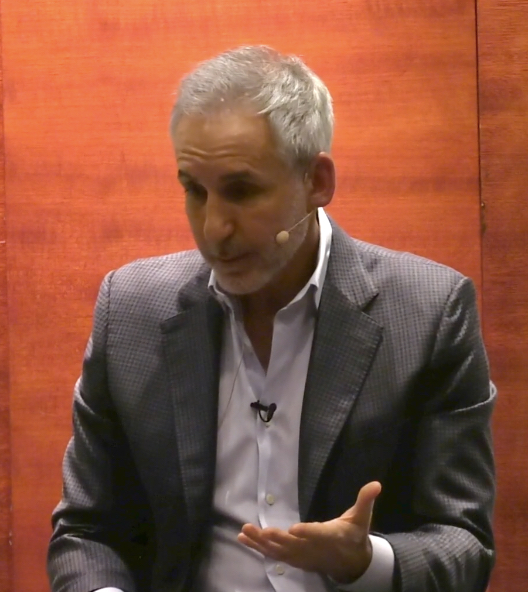
- Born: Paterson, New Jersey, United States
- Education: Hamilton College
- Occupations: Author, Speaker, Coach, Teacher
- Spouse: Elizabeth Mack (m. 1990)
- Children: 3
- Website: garretkramer.com

Garret Kramer is an American author, speaker, coach, and teacher. He is the founder and managing partner of Inner Sports, a Morristown, New Jersey, firm specializing in non-duality and its relevance to performance, happiness, and sports psychology.

During the COVID-19 pandemic, Kramer claimed that the germ theory of disease lacks scientific evidence and asked that his audience explore for themselves before getting the vaccine.

== Early life and background ==
Born in Paterson, New Jersey and raised in nearby Clifton, Kramer graduated in 1980 from the Montclair Kimberley Academy, a secondary school in Montclair, New Jersey, where he played varsity ice hockey from 1977 to 1980. In the latter year, Kramer was the leading scorer in the New Jersey State Interscholastic Athletic Association and a first-team All-State selection. In 2008, he returned to Montclair Kimberley as head coach of the team.

Kramer earned a bachelor's degree in 1984 from Hamilton College in Clinton, New York, where he continued playing ice hockey. He then coached the junior varsity team at Hamilton for one year. Following his time at Hamilton, Kramer began to compete in the game of golf as an Amateur and qualified for four (4) USGA Championships: The 89th U.S. Amateur Championship at Merion Golf Club in August 1989, The 9th U.S. Mid-Amateur Championship at Crooked Stick Golf Club in September 1989, The 10th U.S. Mid-Amateur Championship at Troon Golf & Country Club in October 1990 and the 23rd U.S. Mid-Amateur Championship in October 2003.

== Career ==
In 1995, Kramer founded an organization called Inner Sports, which mentors performers, athletes, coaches, and organizations on one's true nature, or Consciousness, and its bearing on performance. Kramer often conducts seminars and day-long workshops for the general public about exploring the nature of Self and its implications. Kramer has appeared WFAN, WOR, ESPN, FOX, NBC, Golf Channel, CBS, and CTV.

== Authorship ==
Kramer is the author of three books, Stillpower: Excellence With Ease in Sports and Life (ISBN 978-1582703886), which argues that knowing thyself is more important [in performance] than having a command of the skills and behaviors needed, The Path of No Resistance: Why Overcoming Is Simpler Than You Think (ISBN 978-1-62634-117-3), and True Self: Notes on the Essence of Being (ISBN 978-1626347779).

All-star ice hockey player Zach Parise wrote the foreword to Stillpower and told Sports Illustrated in 2010 that he often seeks Kramer's counsel about handling the ebb and flow of life on and off the ice.

== Personal ==
Kramer lives in New Jersey with his wife and three children.

== Bibliography ==
- Kramer, "8 Surprising Characteristics of Winners at the London Olympics", Forbes, August 8, 2012
- "The Psychology Behind Coaches Like Mike Rice: Kramer television interview on "what drove the disgraced Rutgers basketball coach to lash out and abuse his players", On the Hunt, Fox News, April 4, 2013
- Kramer, "Feeling the Fall of Lance Armstrong, BigThink.com, January 28, 2013
- Kramer, "How Your Thoughts Influence Performance—On or Off the Playing Field," About.com
- Kramer, "Do You Set Expectations for Your Organization? Here's Why They're Not Working," Lifehack.com
- Kramer, "Deal With Failure: How to Turn Epic Fails Into Epic Wins," AskMen.com
- "Stillpower: The True Path to Flow, Clarity, and Responsiveness," Garret interview with Jake Cook, 99U.com
