= Hal Ebersole =

American football player (1899–1984)

Profile
- Position: Guard

Personal information
- Born: September 24, 1899; St. Louis, Missouri, U.S.
- Died: September 25, 1984 (aged 85); Atlanta, Georgia, U.S.
- Listed height: 6 ft 3 in (1.91 m)
- Listed weight: 190 lb (86 kg)

Career information
- High school: Montclair Academy
- College: Cornell

Career history
- Cleveland Indians (1923)

Career NFL statistics
- Games played: 2
- Games started: 1
- Stats at Pro Football Reference

Harold Leon "Hal" Ebersole (September 24, 1899 – September 25, 1984) was an American football guard who played one season for the Cleveland Indians of the National Football League (NFL). He went to college at Cornell.

Ebersole was born on September 24, 1899, in St. Louis, Missouri. He went to high school at Montclair Academy (since renamed as Montclair Kimberley Academy) in New Jersey. He went to college at Cornell from 1919 to 1922. Ebersole was the only Monclair Academy attendee to ever play professionally and was one of only 39 pro Cornell players. In 1923, Ebersole played one season for the Cleveland Indians, making two appearances. He also made one start. His weight was 190 pounds while his height was 6–3. Ebersole played the guard position. He died on September 25, 1984, in Atlanta, Georgia, at the age of 85. It was only one day after his 85th birthday.
