= Mike Edwards (American journalist) =

American editor and writer (1931–2016)

- Born: Michael Williams Edwards; December 26, 1931; Marietta, Georgia, US
- Died: January 24, 2016 (aged 84); Arlington, Virginia, US
- Education: University of Georgia (AB)
- Occupations: Journalist, editor
- Years active: 1951–2010
- Employer(s): National Geographic; Peace Corps; Atlanta Journal-Constitution; New York Herald Tribune
- Awards: Foreign Correspondents Association (1988); U.S. Civil War Centennial Commission's Centennial Award (1961)

Michael Williams Edwards (December 26, 1931 – January 24, 2016) was an American journalist, writer, and senior editor with National Geographic. Over his 34 years with National Geographic, Edwards was known for his expeditions into Asia as well unstable or dangerous regions such as the former Soviet Union. He is perhaps best remembered for his eight–month journey retracing Marco Polo's 6,000 mile route along the Silk Road. A history of National Geographic noted, " Author Mike Edwards's ability to weave history with travelogue made him the ideal storyteller.

Edwards also co–wrote the award-winning, multi–year series, "The Atlanta Century," created for The Atlanta Journal-Constitution and evolving to an NBC radio segment.

== Background ==
Edwards was born in Marietta, Georgia. He attended Marietta High School, graduating in 1948. His senior year, he was editor of student newspaper, The Pitchfork, which won numerous awards from Georgia Scholastic Press Association in a statewide competition, including the Athens Banner–Herald Trophy for General Excellence and the Journal Constitution Magazine Award for Feature Handling. Edwards, was called "an outstanding journalism student" by The Atlanta Constitution.

He enrolled in the University of Georgia, graduating with a degree in journalism. While at the University of Georgia, Edwards was president of his senior class and editor of The Red & Black student newspaper in 1951. He also wrote for The Atlanta Constitution.

== Career ==
=== Newspapers ===
After graduating from college, Edwards was a staff writer for The Atlanta Constitution. Next, he headed to New York City where he worked for the New York Herald Tribune. He returned to Georgia and became state editor for The Atlanta Journal. He also wrote a feature on "Antiquities of Afghanistan" for The New York Times.

=== Atlanta Century ===
Starting in March 1960 for the centennial of the Civil War, Edwards and Norman Shavin wrote a one-page weekly supplement for the Sunday edition of The Atlanta Journal-Constitution called "The Atlanta Century." It was also inserted in the Columbia Record and the Miami Herald. The supplement featured original, nonpartisan accounts of that week from 100 years ago, published in the style of a period newspaper. The project involved writing original articles after researching contemporary newspapers and modern, historical sources, as well as consulting with an historian. Edwards said they had to "guard against hindsight influencing the preparation of copy".

Letters praising the series were sent by Bruce Catton, Otto Eisenschiml, Harry Golden, Major General Ulysses S. Grant III, Carl Sandburg, and Bell I. Wiley. Pulitzer Prize winning poet and journalist Carl Sandburg wrote, "I catch myself reading one news story after another, one little item after another, and getting the feel of the days a century ago when history every day was portentous and ran hot and cold. I shall follow your series with interest."

The Idaho State Journal wrote, "Period typefaces and illustrations are used to give a feeling of the time. Modern news writing and headlines are employed, however, with incisive effect." They also noted, "The writers are better-equipped than the average re-write man to give proper weight to the significant and discard immaterial." In 1961, the trade journal Southern Printer and Lithographer featured an article about Edwards and Shavin, stating, "Their product is unusual in that it is truly national in scope and content." "The Atlanta Century" had 500,000 readers, including subscribers in 50 states and 25 countries. It was used by history and journalism classes in universities and secondary schools, and every elementary and high school in Georgia received copies for free.

On March 6, 1960, Edwards and Shavin discussed "The Atlanta Century" on Press Gallery, a show on WSB-TV. WSB–TV would go on the feature the supplement in a twice–weekly series. NBC's national radio show, Monitor, did a newscast based on "The Atlanta Century" for a full year. Managing editor of the radio show, Bruce Buck said, "It is safe to say that this series is one of the most popular...that has even been on Monitor. …It is the longest nonentertainment series we have ever run." Monitor also interviewed Edwards and Shavin about their project on January 16, 1961.

Originally planned as a year-long series, "The Atlanta Century" was so popular that the paper expanded its run for the full five years of the Civil War era and reissued past editions as a premium for new subscribers. Edwards left the Atlanta Journal in 1962 but continued working on "The Atlanta Century" until August 1963. At the end of its run, the series was turned into a book by the same name, The Atlanta Century. Former President Truman added the book to the Harry S. Truman Presidential Library.

=== Peace Corps ===
Edwards worked as an administrator for the Peace Corps from 1962 to 1968. In 1962, he was their information officer, based out of Washington, D.C. In August 1963, he went to Jamaica to serve as the deputy country director. His next position was out of Kabul from 1966 to 1967, where he was deputy country director for Afghanistan. He returned to Washington, D.C. and briefly worked on the Peace Corps' Latin American desk.

=== National Geographic ===
In 1968, Edwards became a staff writer for National Geographic, advancing to assistant editor, then senior editor, by 1979. Some of his earliest articles with bylines were history and Southern-related, such as "The Virginians" in November 1974 and "Thomas Jefferson: Architect of Freedom" in February 1976. He gradually advanced to United States-adjacent countries with "Dream On, Vancouver" in October 1978 and "Mexico: New Era of Challenge" in May 1978. However, once he began working on assignments abroad as with "An Eye for an Eye: Pakistan's Wild Frontier" in January 1977, foreign assignments were common.

Edwards often traveled to war-torn areas, resulting in articles such as "Honduras: Eye of the Storm" in November 1983, "Nicaragua: Nation in Conflict" in December 1985, "El Salvador Learns to Live in Peace" in 1995, "Central Africa's Cycle of Violence" in 1997, and "Eyewitness Iraq" in 1999. The latter included visiting armed camps to see the issues faced by the Kurds firsthand. He also used his experience from the Peace Corps, returning to Afghanistan to write "Kabul, Afghanistan's Troubled Capital" in April 1985 and "Central Asia Unveiled" from February 2002.

He had fifteen assignments in the former Soviet Union, including "Chernobyl—One Year After" in May 1987, "The Gulag Remembered" in March 1990, "Ukraine" in May 1987, "The Fractured Caucasus" in February 1996, "Searching for the Scythians" in September 1996, and "A Comeback for the Cossacks" in November 1998. Recalling his first trip to Ukraine in 1987, Edwards said, "The trick back then was getting an honest story despite the government minders. It really got exciting in '89. Suddenly people would talk to you. They weren't afraid anymore."

Edwards also covered China's past and present: "Shanghai: Muscle and Smoke Born-Again Giant" in July 1980, "Boom Times on the Gold Coast of China" in March 1997, and "Han Dynasty: A Chinese Empire to Rival Rome" in February 2004. In contrast, he wrote about the American west numerous times, including "Should They Build a Fence Around Montana?" in May 1976 and "Along the Great Divide" in October 1979, "Colorado Dreaming" in August 1984, "Battle For a Bigger Bob" in May 1985, "Washington State: Riding the Pacific Tide" in December 1989, "Colorado Plateau" State of Rock" in May 2005, and "Rock of Ages: Canyonlands" in March 2007. He also wrote "A Land Apart – The Monterey Peninsula", published in November 1972.

In 1999, Edwards and National Geographic staff photographer Michael Yamashita began an expedition to prove that Marco Polo's travels to Asia were true, as told in Polo's book A Description of the World. For this story, Edwards spent eight months in the field across four years. He traveled more than 6,000 miles, retracing Polo's path from Venice along the Silk Road through Iran, Iraq, Afghanistan, China and back again. When their long journey was over, the result was unprecedented 82 pages article in National Geographic that spanned May, June, and July 2001 issues. However, retracing Marco Polo's steps almost became impossible when the ruling Taliban militia denied the team entry to Afghanistan. Edwards and Yamashita flew in on an old Soviet-era helicopter to northeastern Afghanistan, which was controlled by the anti–Taliban Northern Alliance. They called upon Northern Alliance commander Ahmad Shah Massoud who served them tea and "gave them a safe-conduct pass for their two-week stay in his territory," along with the offer of food, housing, and an armed escort.

After 34 years, Edwards retired from National Geographic in 2002. His final article as staff was published in June 2003—it was also his 50th article for National Geographic, "good for a second place among the magazine's living writers". His cover stories for the magazine include "Broken Empire: Ukraine Running on Empty" in March 1993, "Genghis Khan: Lord of the Mongols" in December 1996, "Indus: Clues to an Ancient Civilization" in June 2000, "The Adventures of Marco Polo, Part I: Venice to China" in May 2002, and "Masters of Gold" in June 2003

In his retirement, Edwards was a freelance writer for National Geographic, taking his total article count for them to 54. In 2002, Edwards led a National Geographic Expeditions tour for members called "Explore China" that went to see the Forbidden City, the Great Wall of China, the tomb of China's first emperor, the Three Gorges of the Yangtze, and other sites.

=== Other publications ===
In the late 1970s through the 1990s, National Geographic News Service distributed features for newspapers in the United States and Canada via AP Newsfeatures; these were sometimes published as Compass Point National Geographic. Edward had numerous articles selected and published with a bi–line of Mike Edwards/National Geographic. The selections were usually topical to current events, and also related to articles Edwards had or would write for National Geographic, such as Afghan tribesmen in 1979, Kabul in December 1980, life in a Chinese commune in 1980, Mount St. Helens in 1989, Ukraine in 1989, Yalta in 1989, and Soviet prison reform in 1990.

After retirement, Edwards wrote for various publications. In 2004, he contributed a lengthy feature about elder care in other countries for AARP: The Magazine. He also wrote articles for Smithsonian such as "Capturing Warsaw at the Dawn of World War II" in December 2010, "One to Warsaw" in November 2010, and "Wonders and Woppers" in July 2008.

== Awards ==
In 1961, the Congressionally appointed United States Civil War Centennial Commission gave their highest honor, the Centennial Award, to Edwards and Norman Shavin for "The Atlanta Century," a weekly series published by the Atlanta Journal-Constitution. The commission selected "The Atlanta Century" for the first recipient of this medal "because of its objectivity, its appealing style, and its tremendous achievement in promoting both at home and abroad, a better understanding of the great American conflict..."

In 1988, the Foreign Correspondents Association gave Edwards a citation (first runner-up) for best magazine reporting from abroad for "Chernobyl: One Year After, " written for National Geographic.

== Personal ==
Edwards served in the United States Army and remained in the reserves. He married, and later divorced, Evelyn Ketterson. They had two children: Michael Edwards Jr. and Meridith Edwards. His second wife was Jennifer C. Urquhart, a writer for National Geographic Traveler and author of children's books for the National Geographic Society.

He lived in Washington, D.C. Edwards died of cancer at the age of 84 in the Capital Caring Hospice in Arlington, Virginia on January 24, 2016.

== Publications ==
=== National Geographic articles ===
- "Shenandoah, I Long to Hear You", April 1970
- "Mexico to Canada on the Pacific Crest Trail". June 1971
- "A Land Apart – The Monterey Peninsula", November 1972.
- "Hiking the Backbone of the Rockies", June 1973
- "The Virginians", November 1974
- "Thomas Jefferson: Architect of Freedom", February 1976
- "Should They Build a Fence Around Montana?", May 1976
- "An Eye for an Eye: Pakistan's Wild Frontier", January 1977
- "The Danube River of Many Nations, Many Names", October 1977
- "Mexico: New Era of Challenge", May 1978
- "Dream On, Vancouver", October 1978
- "Along the Great Divide", October 1979
- "Tunisia Sea, Sand, Success", February 1980
- "Shanghai: Muscle and Smoke Born-Again Giant", July 1980
- "Honduras: Eye of the Storm", November 1983
- "Colorado Dreaming", August 1984
- "Paradise on Earth: When the Moguls Ruled India", April 1985
- "Kabul, Afghanistan's Troubled Capital", April 1985
- "Battle For a Bigger Bob", May 1985
- "A Short Hike with Bob Marshall", May 1985
- "Nicaragua: Nation in Conflict", December 1985
- "Chernobyl—One Year After", May 1987
- "Ukraine", May 1987
- "Washington State: Riding the Pacific Tide", December 1989
- "Siberia", March 1990
- "The Gulag Remembered", March 1990
- "Mother Russia on a New Course", February 1991
- "Puskin", September 1992
- “After the Soviet Union’s Collapse", March 1993
- "Broken Empire: Ukraine Running on Empty", March 1993
- "Lethal Legacy: Pollution in the Former Soviet Union", August 1994
- "El Salvador Learns to Live in Peace", 1995
- “The Fractured Caucasus”, 1996
- "Searching for the Scythians", September 1996
- "Genghis Khan: Lord of the Mongols", December 1996
- "Joseph Rock" January 1997
- "The Great Kahns", February 1998
- "Boom Times on the Gold Coast of China", March 1997
- "Hong Kong", March 1997
- "Central Africa's Cycle of Violence", June 1997
- "A Comeback for the Cossacks", November 1998
- "Eyewitness Iraq", November 1999
- "Indus: Clues to an Ancient Civilization", June 2000
- “The Adventures of Marco Polo, Part I: Venice to China", May 2001
- “The Adventures of Marco Polo, Part II: Marco Polo in China Part June 2001
- “The Adventures of Marco Polo, Part III: Journey Home." July 2001
- "Central Asia Unveiled", February 2002
- "Masters of Gold", June 2003
- "Han Dynasty: A Chinese Empire to Rival Rome", February 2004
- "Colorado Plateau" State of Rock", May 2005
- "Rock of Ages: Canyonlands", March 2007

=== Smithsonian articles ===
- "Wonders and Whoppers", July 2008
- "One to Warsaw", November 2010
- "Capturing Warsaw at the Dawn of World War II", December 201.

=== Newspaper articles ===
- "The Atlanta Century" series with Norman Shavin. The Atlanta Journal-Constitution, 1960 through 1962
- "Antiquities of Afghanistan", The New York Times, January 14, 1968

=== Other articles ===
- “As Good As It Gets.” AARP: The Magazine, 2004
