= Buzançais =

- Commune
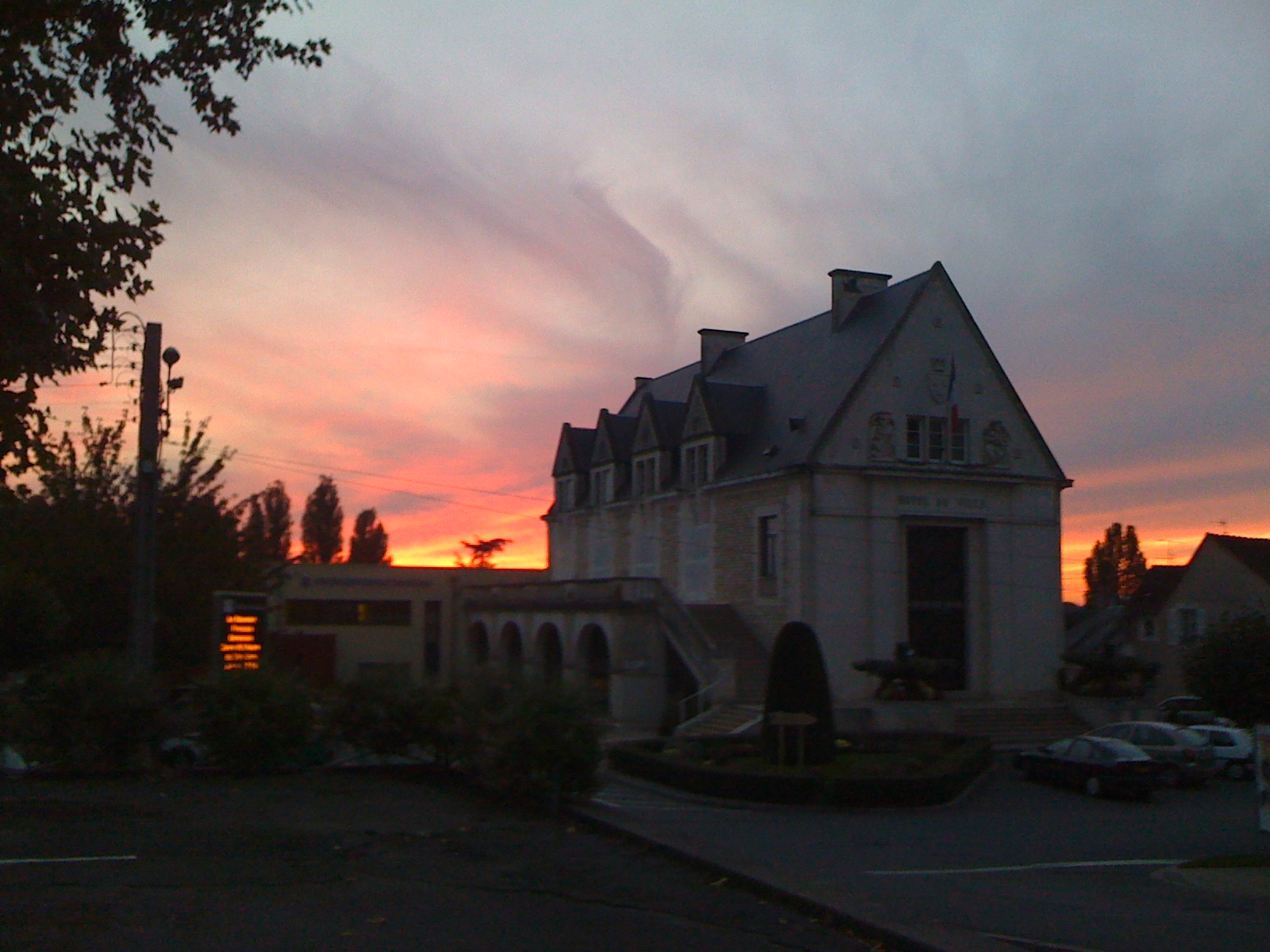
- Town hall

- Coat of arms
- Location of Buzançais
- Location within France Location within Centre-Val de Loire
- Coordinates: 46°53′27″N 1°25′24″E
- Country: France
- Region: Centre-Val de Loire
- Department: Indre
- Arrondissement: Châteauroux
- Canton: Buzançais

Government
  - Mayor (2020–2026): Régis Blanchet
- Area^{1}: 58.64 km^{2} (22.64 sq mi)
- Elevation: 112 m (367 ft)
- Highest elevation: 155 m (509 ft)
- Lowest elevation: 102 m (335 ft)
- Population (2023): 4,356
  - Density: 74.28/km^{2} (192.4/sq mi)
- Demonym: Buzançéen.ne
- Time zone: UTC+01:00 (CET)
  - Summer (DST): UTC+02:00 (CEST)
- INSEE/Postal code: 36031 /36500
- ^{1} French Land Register data, which excludes lakes, ponds, glaciers > 1 km^{2} (0.386 sq mi or 247 acres) and river estuaries.

Buzançais (French pronunciation: [byzɑ̃sɛ]) is a commune and town in the French department of Indre, administrative region of Centre-Val de Loire.

It is situated 22 km (14 mi) northwest of Châteauroux, the nearest large city, and is near the Brenne regional nature preserve located in the historical province of Berry. The Indre river flows through the commune.

== Toponymy ==
Buzancei in Berrichon dialect (langue d'oïl) and Latin: Busentiacum or Busenciacum.

== History ==
Evidence of human settlement dates back to the Bronze Age and the La Tène period (at the latest around the fifth century BC). The site was eventually abandoned, with no Roman period structures having been discovered in the area, indicating a possible displacement of the original settlers.

During antiquity, human activity continued around the Saint-Étienne and Herbigny areas of the town, where parishes were maintained until the end of the modern period.

The Saint-Honoré church, which was destroyed in 1944, left remnants of an early medieval burial. The excavation, which was carried out by the National Institute for Preventive Archaeological Research, determined that the body was of a man aged 30 to 60 years, who had a perimortem trauma in the skull and died between 776 and 971 AD.

Towards the end of the tenth-century AD, the medieval archaeological structures and their carbon layers indicate a strong level of occupation, although no specific cause of the carbon coating has been determined. During the High Middle Ages (c. 10th ce - 13th ce), there were domestic and agricultural structures such as ditches and grain silos.

=== Modern period ===
During the reign of Francis I, Buzançais was designated under the feudal lordship of Philippe Chabot, Admiral De Brion around 1530. In 1576, Catherine Chabot, the admiral's granddaughter, married Guillaume de Saulx and the commune was transmitted to the Saulx-Tavennes family and then fell under control of Charles II, Duke of Elbeuf, whose mother, Marguerite de Chabot-Charny, was another granddaughter of Philippe's. A bailiwick system was established in the county and continued until 1790, a year after the French Revolution began.

=== 1847 Uprising ===
Following a year of bad harvests and economic recession, the price of grain had doubled in the winter of 1846. Amidst food shortages and severe hunger, many peasants believed that the shortage was exacerbated due to hoarding and on January 13, 1847, a crowd of peasants and workers took hold of a shipment of wheat and demanded that it remain in town to be sold to the locals rather than sent elsewhere. A riot soon ensued and the son of one landowner, Eudoxe-Louis-Joseph Chambert, shot and killed one of the protesters, spurring the crowd into beating the assailant to death. The monarchy, faced with growing tensions, moved to crush the uprising with military occupation and sentenced three of the villagers to death. Workers' newspapers were outraged at how the blame was placed squarely on the protestors during the trial and how the authorities did not consider the implications of Chambert firing the first shot.

The incident captured the attention of writers and philosophers. Victor Hugo mentioned the incident in Les Misérables and Gustave Flaubert made reference to the "murders of Buzançais" in his novel Sentimental Education. Karl Marx further referenced the uprising in his Class Struggles in France articles, arguing that the "shameless orgies of the finance aristocracy" necessitated the workers' struggle for food.

== Population ==
The inhabitants are known as Buzancéens and Buzancéennes in French.

Historical population

| Year | Pop. | ±% p.a. |
|---|---|---|
| 1793 | 3,199 | — |
| 1800 | 3,199 | +0.00% |
| 1806 | 3,578 | +1.88% |
| 1821 | 4,218 | +1.10% |
| 1831 | 4,416 | +0.46% |
| 1836 | 4,587 | +0.76% |
| 1841 | 4,430 | −0.69% |
| 1846 | 4,857 | +1.86% |
| 1851 | 4,979 | +0.50% |
| 1856 | 5,050 | +0.28% |
| 1861 | 5,016 | −0.14% |
| 1866 | 5,145 | +0.51% |
| 1872 | 4,986 | −0.52% |
| 1876 | 5,109 | +0.61% |
| 1881 | 5,189 | +0.31% |
| 1886 | 5,149 | −0.15% |
| 1891 | 5,027 | −0.48% |
| 1896 | 4,916 | −0.45% |
| 1901 | 4,871 | −0.18% |

| Year | Pop. | ±% p.a. |
|---|---|---|
| 1906 | 4,843 | −0.12% |
| 1911 | 4,638 | −0.86% |
| 1921 | 4,243 | −0.89% |
| 1926 | 4,349 | +0.49% |
| 1931 | 4,137 | −0.99% |
| 1936 | 4,134 | −0.01% |
| 1946 | 4,511 | +0.88% |
| 1954 | 4,585 | +0.20% |
| 1962 | 4,783 | +0.53% |
| 1968 | 5,140 | +1.21% |
| 1975 | 5,214 | +0.20% |
| 1982 | 4,972 | −0.68% |
| 1990 | 4,749 | −0.57% |
| 1999 | 4,581 | −0.40% |
| 2007 | 4,530 | −0.14% |
| 2012 | 4,481 | −0.22% |
| 2017 | 4,505 | +0.11% |
| 2023 | 4,356 | −0.56% |

Source: EHESS and INSEE (1968-2023)

=== Notable people ===
- Pascal Maitre, contemporary photographer.
- Albert Laprade, architect.
- Michel Denisot, journalist, producer and TV host.

== See also ==
- Communes of Indre
