= Kenneth Garrett =

American photographer of archaeology

Kenneth Garrett (born September 23, 1953) is an American photographer of archaeology.

Garrett was born in Columbia, Missouri and made 70 photos for National Geographic. In 1970 and 1972 he took a course in photojournalism at the University of Missouri and four years later went to University of Virginia where he got his bachelor's degree in anthropology. Currently he specializes in archaeology and paleontology. His photographs of Egyptian and Mayan archaeological findings are displayed in museums such as the Smithsonian and in other countries of the world such as Cuba, Egypt and Japan.
