= Pascal Maitre =

French photojournalist

Pascal Maitre (also Pascal Maître) is a French photojournalist. He was born in 1955 in Buzançais, France, and now lives southwest of Paris, France. For more than 30 years he has taken photographs in over 40 countries in Africa, and worked in Afghanistan, South America, Russia, the Middle East, Latin America and numerous other regions. Each year, he makes about 10 or 15 trips to Africa, which is the continent on which he photographs the most.

His photographs have been published in GEO, Le Figaro, Newsweek, Life, National Geographic, Paris Match, L'Express, Stern, Figaro Magazine, The New York Times Magazine and many others.

== Career ==
Maitre was born into a family of blacksmiths in the small village of Buzançais, France. He was gifted his first camera, a twins-lens Rolleiflex, by his Aunt and Uncle. His uncle was an American soldier that had been stationed at a nearby naval base during World War II. Later in life, Pascal Maitre pursued an undergraduate degree in psychology, but decided to discontinue his studies to learn more about and document France's Roma population.

After a short stint in serving the French army by working in the military's photo lab, Pascal Maitre truly began his career in photojournalism in 1979 with the Jeune Afrique magazine. Working for a publication that analyzed and published African news, in his first assignment he worked to cover the Moroccan war with the Polisario Front.

In 1984, Maitre joined Gamma Agency, where he documented Afghanistan while their population was fighting against Soviet occupation. He then went on to co-found the photo agency Odyssey Images in 1989. Throughout the 90's and 00's, Maitre continued to document politics, religious traditions, cultures, environments, and conflicts around the Middle East and Africa, working in Afghanistan 1996, Mogadishu in 2002, and various countries in Africa throughout each year.

From 1994 to 2018, Maitre was a member of Cosmos Agency. Maitre is currently represented by MYOP.

== Process ==
Pascal Maitre works to document situations in places of political unrest, religious war, poverty, and many other unstable cultural climates. Maitre stresses that he does not work alone, and that other people are vital to capturing the problem at hand. He dedicated a book to honor Ajoos Sanura, someone who was first Maitre's fixer, but became a dear friend.

Because he is often in dangerous situations, his projects can last from 2 days to 2 weeks. As an example of his editing process, during his project Africa Without Electricity, Maitre shot 20,000 photographs, then reduced them to 3,000, then cut to 500, then cut to 200. He utilized the full-frame low light capabilities of the Canon EOS 5D Mark IV and the Canon EF 24-70mm f/2.8 II USM and Canon EF 17-40mm f/4L USM.

== Notable Projects ==
In one of his most notable projects, Africa Without Electricity, Maitre shot in nearly complete darkness as he worked to bring the public's attention of energy poverty in Africa. For this two-year project, Maitre received a grant from the French Development Agency to capture the story of people living in villages near Porto-Novo, the capital of Benin in West Africa. This project won first prize in the 2018 London Business School Photography Awards.

Africa Without Electricity is one of Pascal Maitre's many notable projects, with others listed below in the Exhibitions and Publications sections, and recognized projects in the Awards section.

== Awards ==
- 1986 and 1987: World Press Photo Contest
- 2010: Photojournalism National Magazine Award for "Shattered Somalia"
- 2011: La bourse FNAC d’aide à la creation photographique
- 2013: Prix International Planète Albert Khan
- 2015: Lifetime Achievement Visa d'or Award by Le Figaro Magazine
- 2018: London Business School Photography Award

== Exhibitions ==
- 8 personal exhibitions at Visa pour l'Image
- 2 personal exhibitions at Maison Europeenne de la Photography in France
- Exhibition at Naturhistorisches Museum in Vienna
- Exhibition at Geological Museum in Moscow
- Exhibition at The Arche de la Defense in Paris
- Exhibition at Multimedia Art Museum of Moscow in 2021

== Publications ==
- 2000: "Mon Afrique: Photographs of Sub-Saharan Africa"
- 2001: "Madagascar: Voyage dans un monde à part" - Pascal Maitre and Michael Stührenberg
- 2006: National Geographic cover photo
- 2012: "Amazing Africa" - Pascal Maitre, Lois Lammerhuber, Jean-Luc Marty and Michael Stührenberg
- 2017: "Baobob - The Magic Tree"
- 2017: When Light will Touch Africa
- 2018: Seulement Humains
- 2019: Paris Match- Sahel en Danger, Paris Match- Baobab Citerne, Figaro Magazine- Huile de Palme, National Geographic- A Nation on the Edge
- 2020: Figaro Magazine- Accord de paix en Afghanistan, Figaro Magazine- Afghanistant, Paris Match- Enfants Sorciers
