= George Steinmetz =

American photographer (born 1957)

- Born: October 1, 1957 (age 69); Beverly Hills
- Education: Stanford University
- Occupation: Photographer
- Writing career
- Subject: Aerial photography
- Website: www.georgesteinmetz.com/index

George Steinmetz (born 1957) is an American photographer. His work has been featured in The New York Times, The New Yorker, Smithsonian, Time, The New York Times Magazine, GEO, and he is a regular contributor to National Geographic.

== Early life ==
He was born in the neighborhood of Beverly Hills in Los Angeles and graduated from Stanford University with a degree in geophysics in 1979. He began his career in photography after hitchhiking through Africa for 28 months in his twenties.

== Career ==
He is the author of six books, African Air, Empty Quarter, Desert Air, New York Air, The Human Planet: Earth at the Dawn of the Anthropocene, and Feed the Planet: A Photographic Journey to the World's Food which feature portfolios of his work in many regions of the world. African Air is a compilation of pictures from ten years of flying over Africa, mostly with a motorized paraglider. Empty Quarter contains images of the Arabian landscape, its people, and its wildlife. Desert Air is a photographic collection of the world's "extreme deserts", which receive less than four inches of precipitation per year. Included are photographs of the Gobi Desert, the Sahara, and Death Valley. "New York Air" is an aerial portrait of New York City with all its boroughs in all four seasons. The Human Planet: Earth at the Dawn of the Anthropocene chronicles how humans have come to be the dominant force shaping the environment and the solutions people have come up with to protect the planet and combat pollution. Images taken on all seven continents over Steinmetz's thirty years of aerial photography explore climate and the natural world, how humans have harvested the biosphere and the footprint humanity is leaving on the planet. The Human Planet was honored with the Gold award for Best Travel Book in the 2020 - 2021 SATW Foundation Lowell Thomas Travel Journalism Competition. In Feed the Planet: A Photographic Journey to the World's Food, George spent a decade documenting food production across more than 36 countries on six continents, as well as in 24 U.S. states and five oceans. Through striking aerial images, he captures the immense scale of 21st-century agriculture, which has shaped 40 percent of the Earth's surface. His work addresses one of humanity's most pressing challenges: providing nutritious and sustainably produced food to the growing global population amid the destabilizing effects of climate change. This photographic journey reveals how the world operates and lays the groundwork for understanding how our personal choices can influence the future well-being of everyone. Feed the Planet received 1st place for Documentary Book at the 2025 International Photography Awards and also won the 2025 Wainwright Prize for Illustrative Books.

Since his first assignment for National Geographic in 1987, Steinmetz has completed more than 30 major essays for the magazine, including three covers.

Steinmetz has received many awards during his multi-decade career in photography. Most recently, he was named the Overall Winner of the Drone Photo Awards, Siena, for his Photo of the Year "Shipbreaking on the Mudflats, Bay of Bengal". He was honored with the 2025 Figaro Magazine Lifetime Achievement Visa d’or Award, which stands as recognition of the lifetime achievement of an established photographer who is still working. A recent project on large scale food production won The One Club Gold Cube Award He has won two first prizes in science and technology from World Press Photo and also awards and citations from Pictures of the Year, including the 74th Annual POYi Environmental Vision Award, Overseas Press Club and Life magazine's Alfred Eisenstaedt Awards. In 2006, he was awarded a grant by the National Science Foundation to profit from the work of scientists in the dry valleys and volcanoes of Antarctica. The LOOK3 Festival hosted Steinmetz as a keynote speaker in 2011 for his presentation titled "Wild Air".

Much of his earlier work focused on photographing the world while piloting a motorized paraglider. This experimental aircraft enabled him to capture images of the world inaccessible by traditional aircraft and most other modes of transportation. He began using the paraglider in 1997 when a pilot he had hired for a job in Niger quit. Now he primarily photographs with professional drones.

In 2003 he was the first person to take pictures from a private aircraft in Iran following the revolution.

There is a selection of his work exclusively represented by Anastasia Photo in NYC. His work has also been exhibited in Dubai, the Brookfield Winter Garden in New York., The Arizona-Sonora Desert Museum, The Konica-Minolta Plaza in Tokyo as well as public venues Houston, Denver, Los Angeles, Toronto, Stuttgart, Expo 2015 in Milano, the Triennale di Milano, Horizons Zingst in Germany, Open Your Eyes festival in Zurich, three times at the Festival Photo La Gacilly in France and three times at Visa pour l'Image in France.

There are several videos online that feature Steinmetz and his work. He presented his Feed the Planet project at Aspen Ideas: Health 2025. Steinmetz was featured at TED Global 2017 in Tanzania, where he presented his work on Africa. He was interviewed by the Explorers Club in 2012 and also presented his Feed the Planet project at the Explorer's Club, NYC in 2024. Steinmetz also presented his work at the LOOK3 Festival in Charlottesville, the New England Aquarium, and Harvard University. Steinmetz and his work on the global food supply and his book Feed the Planet was featured on CBS Saturday Morning. He has videos to preview his books African Air, Empty Quarter, and Desert Air.

Steinmetz was a National Geographic explorer and wildlife photographer on Welcome to Earth, the Disney+ original series from National Geographic that follows Will Smith on an extraordinary adventure around the world to explore Earth's greatest wonders and reveal its most hidden secrets. Steinmetz appeared in Episode 2: "Descent into Darkness" and Episode 3: "Mind of the Swarm".

On Oct. 20, 2023, Steinmetz received the Stanford Doerr School of Sustainability's 2023 Distinguished Alumni Award. The award recognizes alumni who have made highly significant, long-lasting contributions to civil, government, business, or academic communities.

== Personal ==
He lives in Glen Ridge, New Jersey. Steinmetz is married to Lisa Bannon, a writer and editor. They have three children.
