= Ira Block =

American photographer

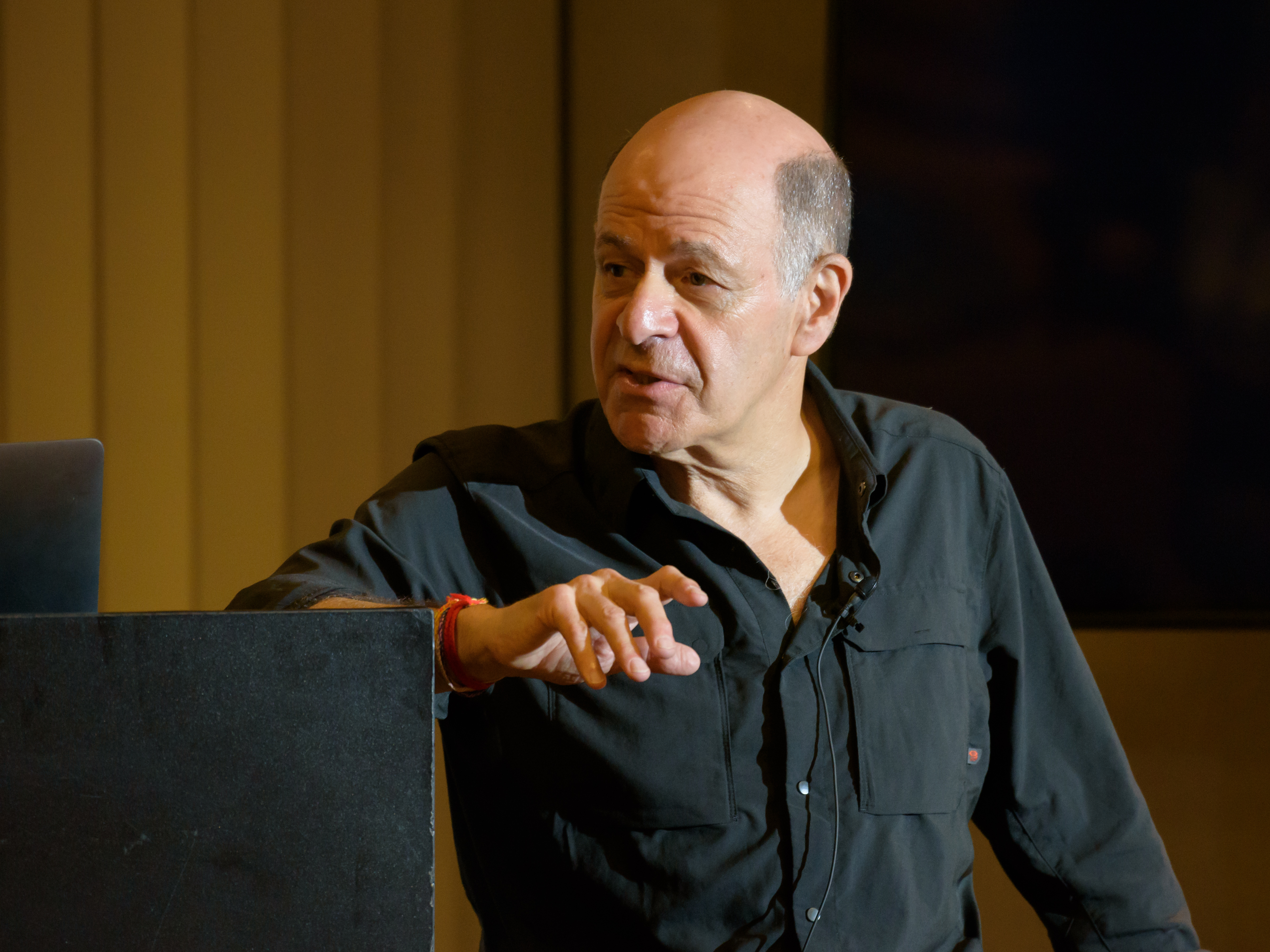
- Born: 1949 (age 76–77); Brooklyn, New York
- Education: University of Wisconsin–Madison
- Occupation: Photographer
- Website: www.irablock.com

Ira Block (born 1949) is an American photographer. Since the mid-1970s, he has shot many stories for the National Geographic Magazine, National Geographic Traveler, and also National Geographic Adventure. He has photographed diverse locations in Africa, the Australian outback, the Gobi Desert, Siberia, and the North Pole where he spent three months with the late Japanese explorer Naomi Uemura. Block's archive includes rare archaeological relics from ancient sites in Eastern Europe and the Middle East, as well as some of the only recorded images of the ritual dances of the Pueblo Indians of the American Southwest.

== Photography career ==
While a student at the University of Wisconsin–Madison, Block shot for the Wisconsin State Journal and covered the turbulent 1968 Democratic Convention in Chicago for United Press International. After leaving Wisconsin, he freelanced in New York for many magazines including Sports Illustrated, TIME and LIFE. He was also a regular contributor to many foreign publications including Stern, Paris Match and German Geo Magazine.

His first National Geographic Magazine assignment was "The Continental Shelf: Man's New Frontier" in April 1978. In the September 1978 edition, he documented the late Japanese explorer Naomi Uemera's solo expedition by dog sled to the North Pole. Following that he photographed a series of stories on indigenous and ancient people including the Fremont and Anasazi cultures in the United States, the Aboriginal people of Australia, and the Moche in Peru. His archaeological work includes worldwide, underwater treasure, colonial excavations in Jamestown, Virginia and Civil War ship wrecks.

In 1980, he partnered with author Tom O'Neill to document the lesser known scenes and sights of America, providing the photographs for the book Back Roads America: A Portfolio of Her People.

Additionally, he has photographed major, worldwide dinosaur finds and specimens. During the summer of 2007, Block spent time in the Gobi Desert and other parts of China for the July 2008 story "The Real Jurassic Park".

A collection of his work has been exhibited at many galleries in the United States and throughout the world.

In 2015, Ira Block began to document the baseball culture in Cuba, photographing grassroots players, stadium games and veterans of the sport. In 2018, he released his book, 'Cuba Loves Baseball: A Photographic Journey by Ira Block' with more than one hundred images of baseball players of all ages. Block's intention is to help preserve baseball's enduring presence in Cuba. 'Cuba Loves Baseball' has been exhibited at The Seattle Public Library in Seattle, Ahha Museum in Tulsa and The Binghamton University Art Museum in Binghamton.

Ira Block is also a Sony Artisan of Imagery and leads workshops and lectures throughout the world.

== Books ==
- Nature's Healing Arts: from folk medicine to modern drugs. Washington, D.C.: National Geographic, 1977. By Lonnelle Aikman. Photographs by Nathan Benn and Block, and paintings by Tony Chen. ISBN 9780870442322.
- Back Roads America: A Portfolio of Her People. Washington, D.C.: National Geographic, 1980. By Thomas O'Neill. Photographs by Block. ISBN 978-0870442872.
- Preserving America's Past. Washington, D.C.: National Geographic, 1983. Text by Leslie Allen, Tom Melham, H. Robert Morrison, Gene S. Stuart. Photographs by Joseph H. Bailey, Nathan Benn, Block, Terry Eiler, Annie Griffiths, Ethan Hoffman, Stephanie Maze. ISBN 978-0870444203.
- Saving America's Treasures. Washington, D.C.: National Geographic, 2000. Photographs by Block; text by Dwight Young. With essays by Ian Frazier. ISBN 978-0-7922-7942-6.
- 1607: A New Look At Jamestown. Washington, D.C.: 2007, National Geographic; National Trust for Historic Preservation. By Karen E Lange. Photographs by Block. ISBN 9781426300127.
- Cuba Loves Baseball: A Photographic Journey by Ira Block New York 2018, Skyhorse Publishing. forewords by Bob Costas and Sigfredo Barros. ISBN 1-5107-3043-5.

== Teaching ==
He is also a frequent lecturer and conducts workshops around the world. He taught a photo expedition in Tokyo in summer 2019.
