= Norbert Rosing =

German photographer (born 1953)

Norbert Rosing (born 1953) is a German photographer who worked for such magazines as GEO, Terre Sauvage, BBC Wildlife, Photo Technik International, and National Geographic among others. In 2000 he published his first photo for the Nat Geo story called Bear Beginnings: New Life on the Ice and since December of the same year worked there. He is also an author of many books including Cheetahs, German National Parks, Unknown Germany, The World of the Polar Bear, Yellowstone: Land of Fire and Ice, and Yellowstone: America's Playground.
