= Michael Melford (photographer) =

American photographer, artist and teacher (born 1950)

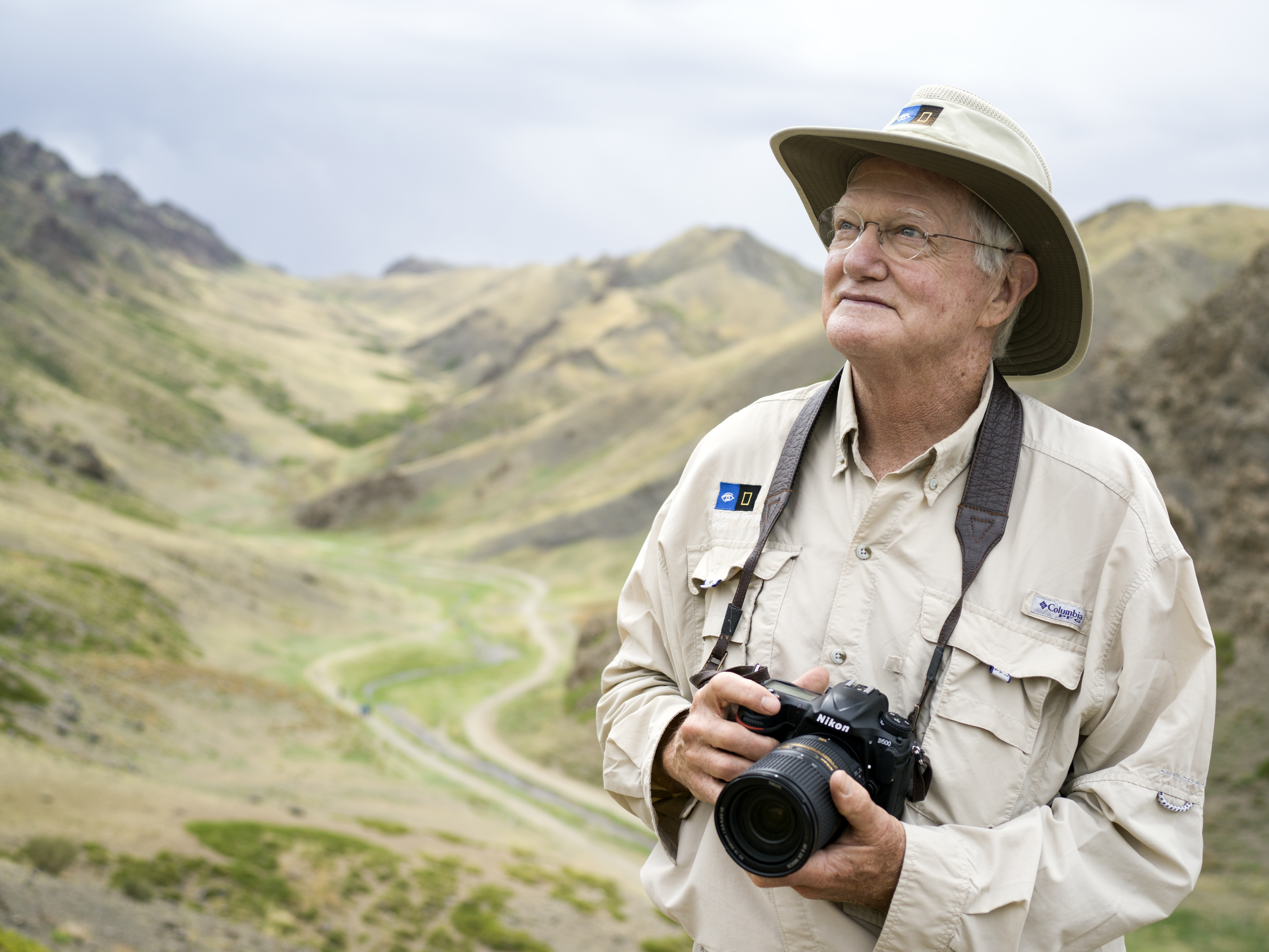
Melford (2017)

Michael Melford (born February 18, 1950, Gloversville, NY) is an American photographer, artist and teacher known for his National Geographic magazine assignments.

== About ==
Michael Melford grew up in Hastings-on-Hudson, NY. He has a BS in photography from Syracuse University.

Melford is known for his raw, natural landscapes and his ability to capture vibrant motion in nature. He has produced over 30 stories for National Geographic Traveler magazine, including eight covers. He has extensively photographed the marvels of America's National Parks and Alaska. His inspirations are Ansel Adams and Ernst Haas.

== Work ==
Melford's photographs have appeared in The Apple Store, Life Magazine, Newsweek, Time, Fortune, Smithsonian, Geo, Travel & Leisure, Travel Holiday, Coastal Living, National Geographic Traveler and National Geographic.

His image of Montana's Glacier National Park was featured on a U.S. Postage stamp, first issued January 19, 2012. Five of his photographs appeared as part of the "Wild and Scenic Rivers" Forever Stamps released in 2019 from the United States Postal Service. Melford's images were of the Merced River in California, the Idaho segment of the Owyhee River, the Koyukuk River in Alaska, the Niobrara River in Nebraska, and the Tlikakila River in Alaska. This stamp series celebrated the 50th anniversary of America's Wild and Scenic Rivers Act, signed into law in 1968.

Melford is a frequent workshop and seminar instructor for Visionary Wild, Lindblad Expeditions, and National Geographic Expeditions.

=== National Geographic works ===
Issue	Article	Cover story?
April 2005	Saving Civil War Battlefields	YES
November 2005	Acadia National Park	NO
April 2006	Glen Canyon Revealed	NO
August 2006	Great Smoky Mountains National Park	NO
October 2006	Our National Parks in Peril	YES
September 2007	Glacier National Park: Crown of the Continent	NO
December 2008	King Herod: Architect of the Holy Land	YES
January 2009	Russian Kronotsky Preserve: Let it Be	NO
September 2009	Plugging into the Sun-Solar Energy	NO
December 2010	Alaska's Choice: Gold or Salmon?	NO
September 2011	Forever Wild in the Adirondacks	NO
November 2011	The Glory of America's Wildest Rivers	NO
June 2012	Socotra: Yemen's Mysterious Island	NO
March 2017	Formed by Megafloods, This Place Fooled Scientists for Decades (online only)	NA

=== Selected works ===
The Smithsonian Guide to Historic America: The Mid-Atlantic States, 1989, Steward Tabori & Chang, ISBN 1556700504, with Michael S. Durham

Big Sky Country: The Best of Montana, North Dakota, Wyoming, and Idaho, 1996, Rizzoli, ISBN 0847819647

National Geographic Destinations, Treasures of Alaska: The Last Great American Wilderness, 2002, National Geographic, ISBN 0792264703, with Jeff Rennicke

Simply Beautiful Photographs, 2010, Focal Point (National Geographic), ISBN 1426206453 (Cover Photo)

Visions of Earth, 2011, National Geographic, ISBN 1426208839

Hidden Alaska: Bristol Bay and Beyond, 2011, ISBN 1426207700, with Dave Atcheson
