= John Gurche =

American paleoartist

- Born: October 30, 1951 (age 74); Kansas City, Missouri
- Occupation: Paleoartist
- Known for: Jurassic Park consultant
- Notable work: National Museum of Natural History's Hall of Human Origins
- Website: http://www.gurche.com

John Gurche (born 10 October 1951, in Kansas City, Missouri) is an American artist known for his paintings, sculptures, and sketches of prehistoric life, especially dinosaurs and early humans. Gurche is currently an Artist in Residence at the Museum of the Earth in Ithaca, New York. Gurche studied Anthropology and Paleontology at the University of Kansas, but his study of art was limited to his days in middle school. Also while in middle school, Gurche attempted to create a "family tree for all animal life" and fashioned an evolutionary series of heads from clay while in fourth grade.

VOA report about Gurche's hominid sculptures

Gurche's works have been on display at the American Museum of Natural History, the Field Museum of Natural History, and the Smithsonian Institution. He has created illustrations for National Geographic, and designed a set of four dinosaur-themed stamps that were released by the US Postal Service in 1989. Due to his paintings of dinosaurs, Gurche was given a role as a consultant for the movie Jurassic Park.

In 2000, he received the Lanzendorf PaleoArt Prize from the Society of Vertebrate Paleontology for his mural of Sue the Tyrannosaurus, a piece which accompanies the dinosaur's skeleton at the Field Museum.

In 2013 he published a book detailing his work on the fifteen paleoanthropology projects he had completed for the Smithsonian Institution's National Museum of Natural History's Hall of Human Origins titled Shaping Humanity: How Science, Art and Imagination Help Us Understand Our Origins . Much of the book discusses the uncertainty of his work and his field.
