= Élisabeth Daynès =

French artist

- Born: 1960; Béziers, France
- Education: autodidact
- Known for: Sculpture, Plastic arts
- Awards: John J. Lazendorf Paleoart prize

Élisabeth Daynès (born in Béziers in 1960) is a French sculptor notable for her anthropological work relating to early humans.

By 1981, she was working with the Théâtre de la Salamandre in Lille, creating masks for the theatre. In 1984, she founded her own studio, Atelier Daynès, in Paris. Some years later, the museum at Le Parc du Thot, close to the Lascaux caves, asked her to sculpt a life-sized woolly mammoth with a group of humans from the Magdalenian epoch. She has since specialized in reconstructing hominids from remaining bones. Her work is present in museums all over the world, including the Musée des Merveilles in Tende, Field Museum of Natural History in Chicago, Transvaal Museum in Pretoria, Sangiran Museum in Indonesia, Naturhistoriska riksmuseet in Stockholm, and Museum of Human Evolution in Burgos (Spain). One Daynès sculpture at the Field Museum depicts Homo ergaster, a pre-Neanderthal hominid that lived about 1.6 million years ago. One of her most notable sculptures is at the Krapina Neanderthal Museum in northern Croatia, where she made a reconstruction of an entire seventeen-member Neanderthal family.

In 2005, she created a lifelike model of Pharaoh Tutankhamun in a project with National Geographic. A close resemblance to the Pharaoh is likely, even though physical features like ears, nose tip, and colors of skin and eyes cannot be reliably reconstructed.

== Award ==
In 2010 Daynès won the John J. Lazendorf Paleoart prize, widely regarded as the most prestigious award given to artists in science art related to paleontology, in the category of Three-Dimensional Art.
