= Lynne Warren =

American curator and writer

Lynne Warren an American curator and writer who worked from 1977 to 2020 at the Museum of Contemporary Art (MCA), Chicago. She is a scholar of the Chicago Imagists, conceptual photography, Alexander Calder, and Chicago art from the mid-twenty-first century to the present. Sixty Inches from Center called her a "true pioneer in the field of contemporary art" in 2017.

== Life and education ==
Warren was born in Lowell, Massachusetts and grew up in rural Pacific, Missouri. She moved to Chicago in 1971 to study art at the School of the Art Institute of Chicago (SAIC) and completed additional coursework at the University of Chicago. She received a Bachelor of Fine Arts in 1976.

== Career ==
Warren started at the MCA in 1977 as an Education Assistant, and her titles include: Curator, 1999–2017; Curator, Special Projects, 1995–1999; Associate Curator, Collections, 1990–1995; Acting Chief Curator, January-June, 1987; Associate Curator of Exhibitions, 1984–1990; Assistant Curator, 1982–1984; Curatorial Assistant, 1980–1982; Curatorial Secretary, 1979–1980. She also oversaw the development and maintenance of the Artists’ Books Collection at the MCA.

She has authored a number of books, catalogue essays, and articles on contemporary art. She frequently speaks and teaches about the history of Chicago art since the 1940s, with a focus on alternative, artist-run, and nonprofit spaces. She has produced major scholarship on subjects including the Monster Roster, Hairy Who, and smaller movements within the genre of Chicago Imagism. She has taught at institutions including the University of Chicago, The School of the Art Institute of Chicago, Northwestern University, and the University of Illinois at Chicago. Her curatorial ethos is perhaps best summarized by this quote (referencing Art in Chicago, 1945-1995): “This show attempts, as much as possible, to take the curator's ego out through the whole methodology and tries objectively to look at how the art community developed here. This is an organic history, not a beauty contest."

== Key exhibitions and publications (select) ==
In her four decades at the MCA, Warren organized over 30 major exhibitions in addition to 12x12 shows and In Memoriam displays. She curated the group exhibitions Surrealism: The Conjured Life (2015), Art in Chicago, 1945–1995 (1996)—which was called “the final word on the local art of that period” by Chris Miller in Newcity, and Alternative Spaces: A History in Chicago (1984). A number of the exhibitions traveled nationally, including Alexander Calder: Form, Balance, Joy (2010) and H. C. Westermann (2001), which was accompanied by a catalogue raisonné. She also curated solo exhibitions for artists including: Diane Simpson (2016), Jim Nutt (2010), Chris Ware (2005), Dan Peterman (2004), Robert Heinecken (1999), Nancy Chunn (1991), Jon Kessler (1987), Julia Wachtel (1987), and Kenneth Josephson (1983). She also authored over 30 MCA exhibition catalogs, contributed to the Encyclopedia of Chicago and the Groves Dictionaries Dictionary of Art; and edited the three-volume reference book The Encyclopedia of Twentieth Century Photography published by Taylor and Francis (2005).
