= Michael Yamashita =

American photographer (born 1949)

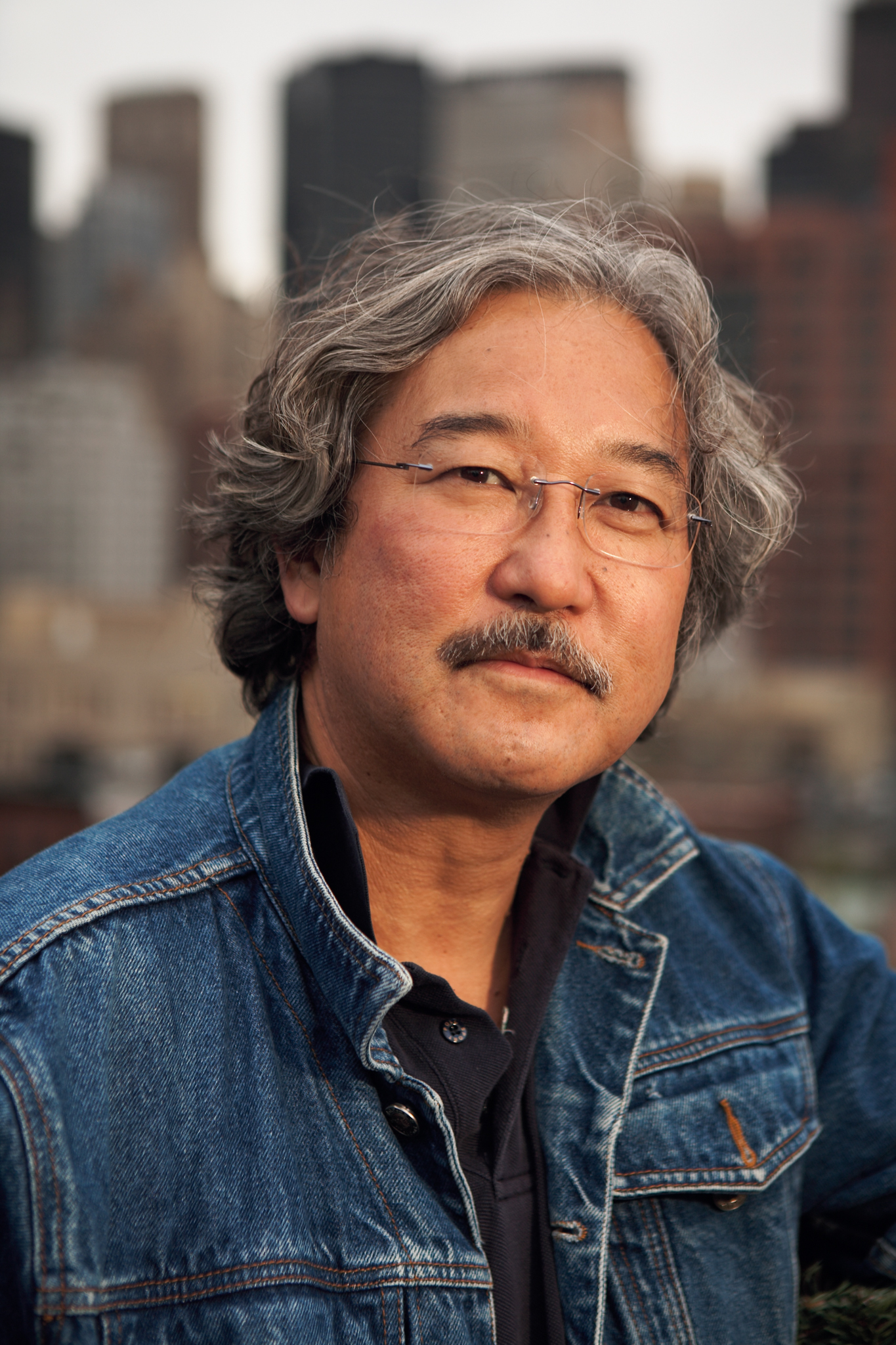
Michael Yamashita in 2006

Michael Yamashita is a Japanese-American photographer.

== Early life and education ==
Born in 1949 in San Francisco, California, and raised in Montclair, New Jersey. Yamashita graduated from Montclair Academy in 1967.

== Photography career ==
After college in 1971, he traveled to Japan to teach English. After joining a photo club to work on his Japanese, he was inspired to pursue photography professionally. After living and shooting throughout Asia for seven years, he returned to the US where he started working for the National Geographic in 1979, photographing in various countries.

== Personal life ==
Yamashita lives and works in Chester Township, New Jersey, with his wife and frequent collaborator, Elizabeth Bibb, where he also serves as a volunteer fireman.

== Publications ==
=== Books by Yamashita ===
- Yamashita, Michael S. (1988). United States Merchant Marine Academy. Louisville: Harmony House. ISBN 0-916509-45-1. OCLC 20392310.
- Yamashita, Michael S.; Bibb, Elizabeth (1991). In the Japanese Garden. Washington, D.C.: Starwood Pub. ISBN 0-912347-80-5. OCLC 25002507.
- Yamashita, Michael S. (1995). Mekong: A journey on the Mother of Waters. New York, N.Y.: Takarajima Books. ISBN 978-1-883489-09-0. OCLC 32838383.
- Yamashita, Michael S.; Carroll, John (2003). Japan: The Soul of a Nation. Boston, Mass. ISBN 978-1-4629-1460-9. OCLC 869880150.
- Yamashita, Michael S.; Guadalupi, Gianni (2006). Zheng He: Tracing the Epic Voyages of China's Greatest Explorer. Vercelli, Italy: White Star Publishers. ISBN 88-544-0164-1. OCLC 74825441.
- Yamashita, Michael S.; Bibb, Elizabeth; Häusler, Barbara (2007). New York. Wiesbaden. ISBN 978-3-939128-70-0. OCLC 180164396.
- Yamashita, Michael; Lindesay, William (2007). The Great Wall: From Beginning to End. New York: Sterling. ISBN 978-1-4027-3160-0. OCLC 82474195.
- Yamashita, Michael S. (2006). Die Drachenflotte des Admirals Zheng He: Ein Fotograf auf den Spuren des Größten Seefahrers Aller Zeiten (in German). München: Frederking & Thaler. ISBN 3-89405-666-5. OCLC 162209159.
- Yamashita, Michael S. (2004). Marco Polo: A Photographer's Journey. United States: White Star Pub. ISBN 88-544-0005-X. OCLC 57544858.
- Yamashita, Michael S.; NGC Network Asia, LLC (2011). It All Started with the Railroad. Singapore: Credit Suisse Group AG. ISBN 9810704151. OCLC 854620882.
- Yamashita, Michael S.; Bibb, Elizabeth (2011). New York from Above. Vercelli, Italy: White Star Publishers. ISBN 978-88-544-0612-4. OCLC 707260703.
- Yamashita, Michael S.; Hu, Zongxiang (2013). Shangri-la: Along the Tea Road to Lhasa. Beijing Shi. ISBN 978-7-121-19659-1. OCLC 868058621.
- Yamashita, Michael S. (2015). A Light on the Straits: Maritime Singapore. Singapore. ISBN 9789810969257. OCLC 948735387.
- Yamashita, Michael S.; Bibb, Elizabeth (2019). Shangri-la: Along the Tea Road to Lhasa. Milan, Italy. ISBN 978-88-544-1560-7. OCLC 1108546768.

=== Contributions ===
- O'Neill, Thomas (1984). Lakes, Peaks, and Prairies: Discovering the United States–Canadian Border. Washington, D.C.: National Geographic Society. ISBN 0-87044-478-6. OCLC 11289059.
- Parr, Barry (1996). San Francisco and the Bay Area. New York: Compass American Guides. ISBN 187886792X. OCLC 1036852525.
- Reavill, Gil (1996). Manhattan. New York: Compass America Guides. ISBN 1878867946. OCLC 34699496.
- Castleman, Deke (2004). Las Vegas. New York: Compass American Guides. ISBN 1-4000-1244-9. OCLC 53966468.
- United States Postage stamp: 90 cents, Hagatna Bay, Guam single, 2007.

== Filmography ==
- Marco Polo: The China Mystery Revealed – Finnigan, Jonathan (director) Jennifer Lee (writer). Produced by Yamashita, Craig Leeson and Farland Chang. United States.
- Ghost Fleet – The Epic Voyage of Zheng He – Finnigan, Jonathan (director) (2005). (Motion picture). Produced by Yamashita. United States: National Geographic, Channel Asia.
