= Peter Lik =

Australian photographer

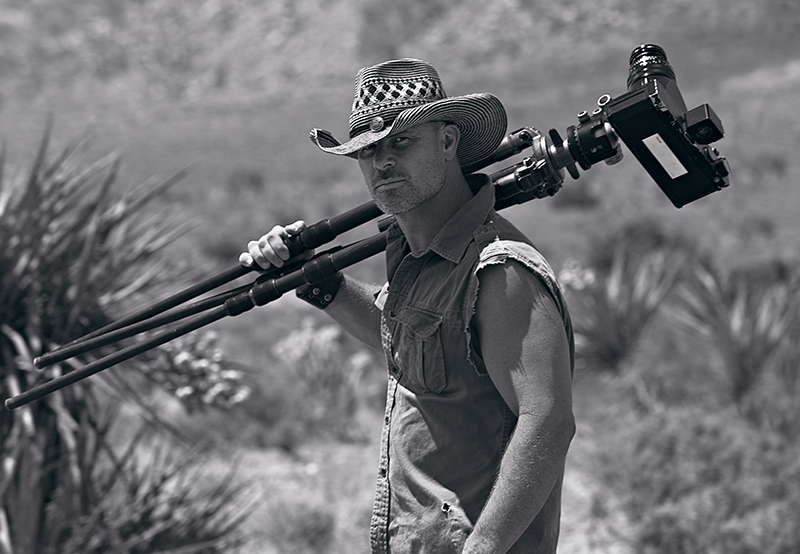
- Born: 1959 (age 66–67); Melbourne, Victoria, Australia
- Occupation: Photographer
- Years active: 1984–present
- Website: lik.com

Peter Lik (born 1959) is an Australian photographer best known for his nature and panoramic landscape images. He hosted From the Edge with Peter Lik, which aired for one season on The Weather Channel.

== Early life ==
Lik was born in Melbourne to Czech parents who emigrated to Australia after World War II. He took his first photo at the age of 8, after his parents gave him a Kodak Brownie box camera for his birthday. The shot was of a spider web in the garden of the family home. In his youth, Lik would bring his camera on family vacations and take photos of country scenes and the ocean. This practice continued when he took road trips out of the city and into the wilds of Australia, often accompanied by his friend and fellow photographer Michael Plumridge. As a photographer, Lik is self-taught, learning mostly by trial and error.

== Career ==
=== Photography ===
In 1984, Lik made his first trip to the United States, traveling around the country for a year in an old van. While in Alaska, he was introduced to panoramic cameras and learned about large format photography. Upon his return to Australia, he continued to experiment with the panoramic format. In 1989, Lik returned to the United States, undertaking a project to photograph landscapes in all 50 states. Photos from the project were later collected in his 2003 coffee table book, Spirit of America.

Lik spent the early 1990s working for the tourism department of Queensland, Australia, traveling through the Outback and photographing little-seen areas. In 1994, he moved to Las Vegas, Nevada. Since the mid-1990s he has self-published coffee table books, postcards and calendars of his work. In 1997, he published his first book, Australia: Images of a Timeless Land. In 2010, he published a 25-year retrospective coffee table book, 25th Anniversary Big Book, containing over 500 images.

In December 2010, Lik sold by his own account a photograph for US$1 million to an anonymous collector, his highest-priced sale at that time. There is no independent evidence for this statement. The photograph, titled "One", was shot on the banks of the Androscoggin River in New Hampshire. According to BuzzFeed, as of 2011, the amount paid for "One" is the eleventh-highest price ever paid for a photo. The highest sale at auction until 2023 was the work "Beyond Paradise", hammer price : 11,000 $ (Revere Auctions, 27.01.2022, Saint Paul MN, USA).

After winning the Art in Nature category of the 2010 Windland Smith Rice International Awards from Nature's Best Photography, "Ghost" (taken in Antelope Canyon, Arizona) was selected as part of a May 2011 exhibition of nature photography at the Smithsonian Institution National Museum of Natural History in Washington, D.C. The photo was shot in a slot canyon with the sunlight coming in through a hole above, creating a ghostly aura. His "Inner Peace" won a 2011 Windland Smith Rice International Award, and was on display at the Smithsonian from April through September 2012.

In December 2014, Lik claimed to have sold a photograph titled "Phantom" to an anonymous bidder for $6.5 million, making it potentially the third highest price paid for a photograph as of 2023. Lik's claim has been greeted with much scepticism. No details of the sale have been verified though a lawyer confirmed that the mysterious buyer does exist.

=== Television ===
From the Edge with Peter Lik debuted on The Weather Channel on 31 March 2011, running for one season, with Lik as the host. The documentary series followed Lik on his journeys across the United States searching for and photographing attractive landscapes, such as the volcanoes of Hawaii, mountains of Montana, Arizona's Grand Canyon, and Denali National Park and Preserve in Alaska. The show was The Weather Channel's first original programme.

== Style ==
Lik is best known for his panoramic photos, and the large size and overall quality of his prints. He typically shoots panoramas with a Linhof 617 Technorama camera, using Fuji film. He also shoots digital, primarily using Phase One and Nikon cameras. He prints most of his photos on FujiFlex silver-halide paper, which increases the light sensitivity and glow, and helps accentuate the vibrant colors in the print.

== Bibliography ==
- Australia: Images of a Timeless Land. Cairns, Australia: self-published, 1997. ISBN 978-1876585037.
- Spirit of America. Cairns, Australia: self-published, 2003. ISBN 978-1876585150.
- San Francisco. Cairns, Australia: self-published, 2003. ISBN 978-1876585075.
- Hawaii: The Aloha Spirit. Self-published, 2003). ISBN 978-0979792700.
- Las Vegas and Beyond. Las Vegas: self-published, 2006. ISBN 978-1876585280.
- Maui: Hawaiian Paradise (2006). ISBN 978-1876585266.
- Las Vegas: Beyond the Neon (2009)
- Equation of Time (2015)
- America (2015)
- New York (2015)
- Hawaii (2015)
- Las Vegas (2016)

== Honors and awards ==
- Master of Photography, Australian Institute of Professional Photography, 2002
- Master of Photography, Professional Photographers of America, 2010
- British Institute of Professional Photography Fellow, 2010
- Royal Photographic Society Fellow, 2010
- Nature's Best Photography Windland Smith Rice International Award – Art in Nature Winner, "Ghost at Antelope Canyon", 2010
- Nature's Best Photography Windland Smith Rice International Award – Plant Life Winner, "Japanese Maple", 2011
- American Aperture Awards, Best Landscape/Seascape/Nature, 2013
