= Rodney Lough Jr. =

American photographer and gallery owner

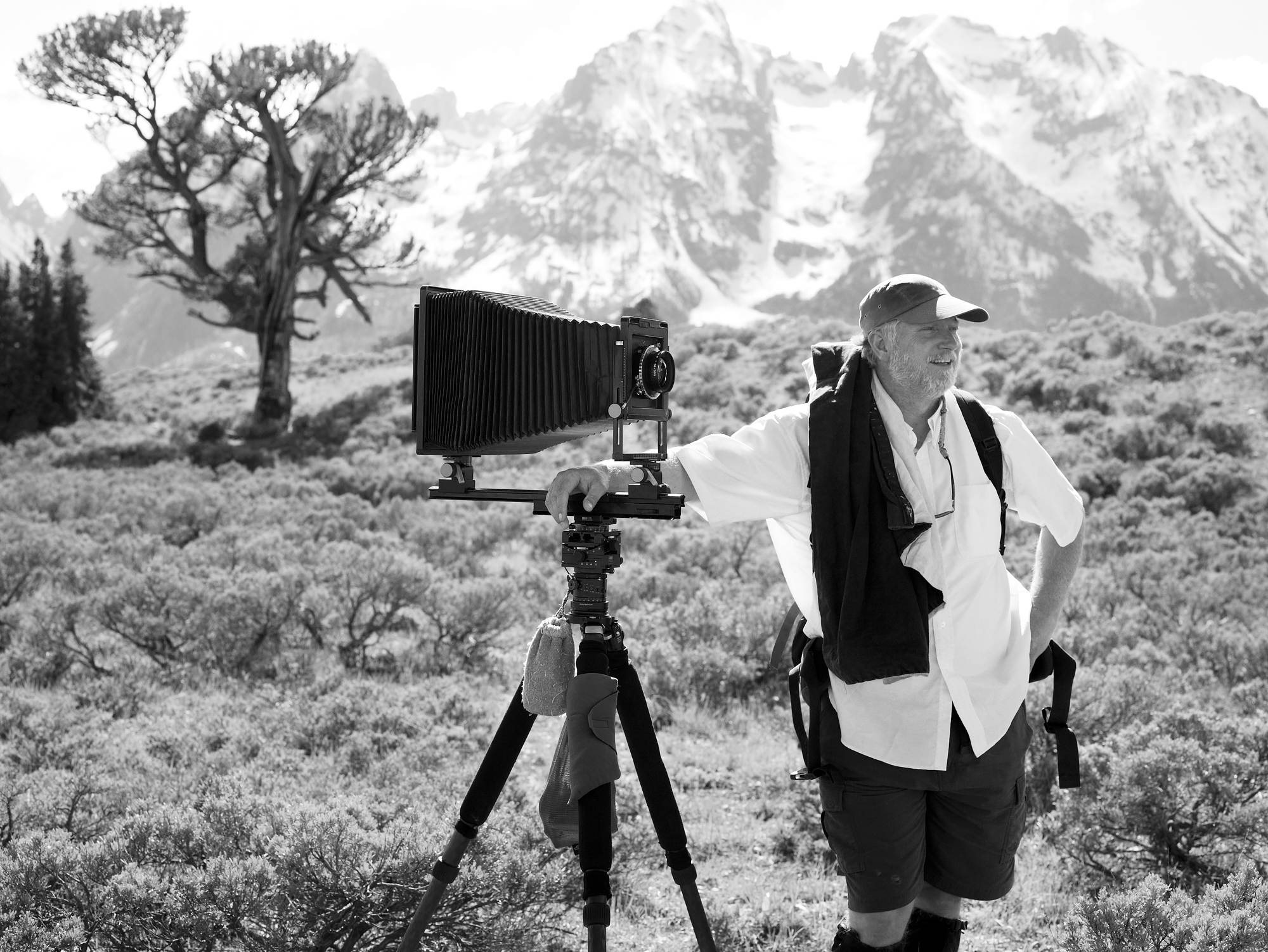
- Rodney Lough Jr.
- Born: July 22, 1960 (age 66); Jacksonville, Florida, United States
- Known for: Landscape photography
- Website: rodneyloughjr.com

Rodney Lough Jr. (born 1960) is an American landscape photographer and gallery owner.

== Early life ==
Rodney Lough Jr. was born 1960 in Jacksonville, Florida. Lough spent part of his childhood in Lake Oswego, Oregon. His first camera, an Olympus OM-1, was a gift from an uncle when Lough was a child. In 1988 at the age of 28, he graduated from Brigham Young University with a Master of Science in Statistics degree.

== Career ==
Lough's 2011 Popular Photography grand prize winner

After graduating from Brigham Young University in 1988, Lough worked as a statistician and mathematician. Seven years later in 1995, he became a full-time photographer. In 1999, Lough received the A.B. Jackson Award for photography at Virginia's Art Explosure.

In 2000-2001, while living in Happy Valley, Oregon, Lough focused on landscape photography and drew his entire income from art festival circuit artwork sales. In 2000, he spent six months out of the year driving to and participated in 32 shows around the United States and spent the other six months photographing landscape scenes. In 2001, his efforts paid off and he was invited to participate in the Lake Oswego, Oregon art festival, close to where he grew up. Lough also opened his first gallery in 2001.

In 2009, Lough opened Rodney Lough Jr. Wilderness Collections to sell award-winning photography in the Mall of America, one of the largest shopping mall in the United States that is located in Bloomington, Minnesota. Later that year, in December, Lough opened his City Center Gallery in CityCenter Las Vegas, a 16,797,000-square-foot (1,560,500 m^{2}) mixed-use, urban complex on 76 acres (31 ha) located on the Las Vegas Strip in Paradise, Nevada that opened on December 16, 2009. Along with American glass sculptor and entrepreneur Dale Chihuly and contemporary bronze sculpture figurative artist Richard MacDonald, Lough's works contribute to comprising a Gallery Row of Fine Art at CityCenter. By May 2010, Lough photography success had gained him a fan base of young photographers. One commentator noted in August 2010 that, at Lough's Wilderness Collections gallery in Sausalito, "the jump-out-at-you colors of the nature photography of Rodney Lough Jr. recalled memories of visits to Point Reyes and Yosemite National Park."

In August 2011, Lough's The Lough Road company received US$650, 000 in funding from angel investment company Keiretsu Forum to open a San Francisco, California of the Rodney Lough Jr. Wilderness Collection Gallery. Wilderness Collection Gallery San Francisco, located on One Jefferson Street in San Francisco, features Lough's wilderness landscape. In December 2011, the readers of Popular Photography magazine named Lough the grand prize winner in that magazine's 18th annual Readers' Photo Contest. The natural world photo which brought him the top award over 3,500 other previously award winning submissions, "Passing Through," was taken at Nevada's Black Rock Desert and focused on color, texture and detail that allowed viewers to see in real life what they otherwise would never see. In 2012, Lough lead several outdoor photography workshops in Arizona's Antelope Slot Canyon near Page, Arizona. Also in 2012, Trewin Framery and Art Gallery in Modesto, California maintained an ongoing exhibit of Lough's work.

== Awards ==
Through his photography career, Lough or his company has won:

- 2007 Nature's Best Photography Windland Smith Rice International Print Awards - Best Landscape Photographer
- 2009 Printing Industries of America Award ("Benny" Award) - Best of Category for 'Art Books (4 or more colors)' - for Beyond the Trail
- 2014 Wilderness Forever at Smithsonian National Museum of Natural History - Grand Prize

== Books ==
- Lough Jr., Rodney (2000). Wilderness Collections. Wilsonville, Oregon: The Lough Road. ISBN 0-9704011-0-8.
- Lough Jr., Rodney (2008). Beyond the Trail. Wilsonville, Oregon: The Lough Road. ISBN 978-0-9704011-1-3.
- Lough Jr., Rodney (2012). Stand Here. Wilsonville, Oregon: The Lough Road. ISBN 978-0-9704011-0-6.
- Lough Jr., Rodney (2016). Swan Song. Wilsonville, Oregon: The Lough Road. ISBN 978-0-9704011-2-0.

== Exhibitions ==
- "Nature's Best". Smithsonian Museum of Natural History (2007–2008)
- "Wilderness Forever". Smithsonian Museum of Natural History (2014–2015)
