= Frans Lanting =

Dutch photographer, author and speaker

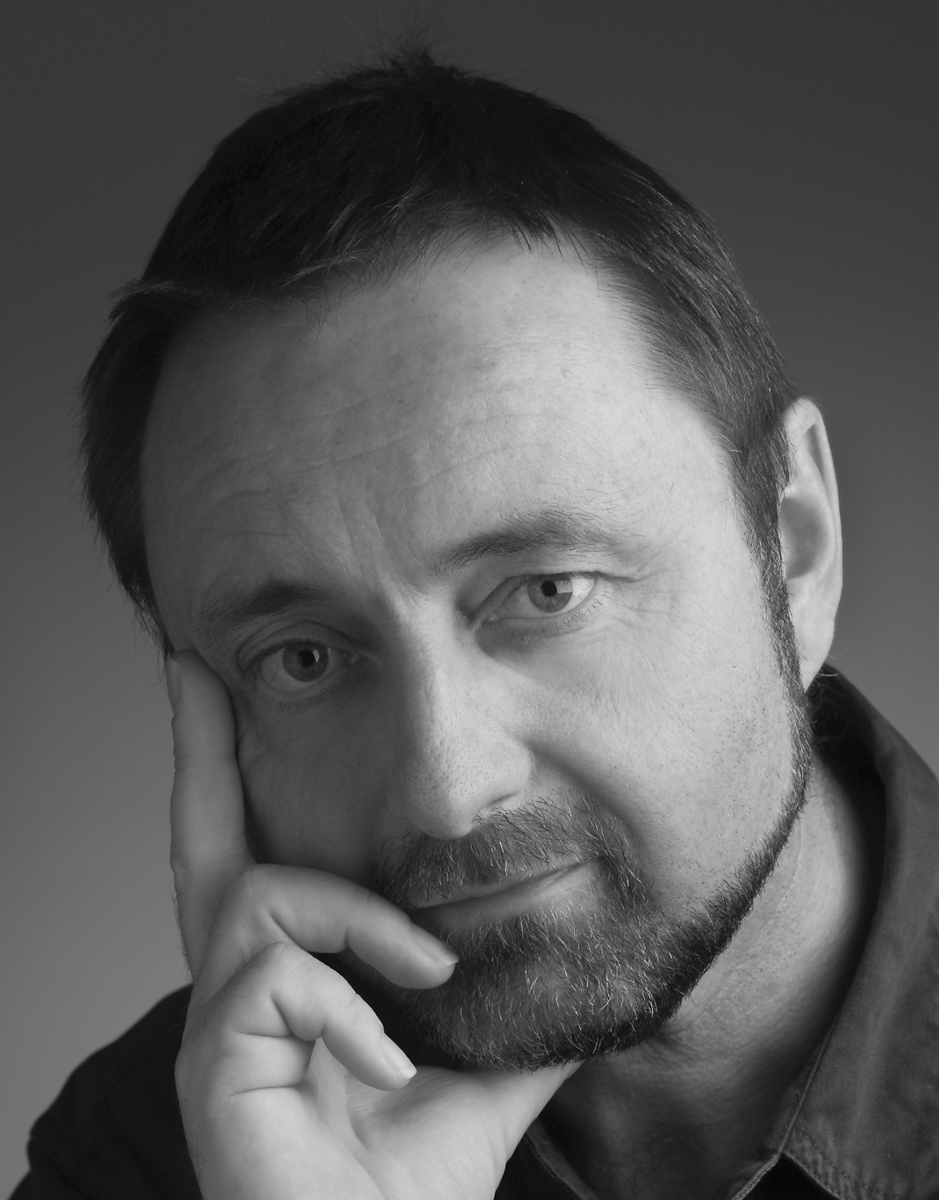
- Born: 13 July 1951 (age 75); Rotterdam, Netherlands
- Occupations: Photographer; Author; Public Speaker
- Website: lanting.com

Frans Lanting (born 13 July 1951) is a Dutch National Geographic photographer, author and speaker.

== Life ==
Lanting was born in Rotterdam in Netherlands. He studied economics at the Erasmus university in Rotterdam and later immigrated to the United States. He now lives in Santa Cruz, California, and operates a studio and gallery as well as a stock photography service. Lanting's wife Christine Eckstrom is a writer, editor, producer, and works on joint books of nature photography.

Lanting works in many different parts of the world, including the Amazon basin, Africa and Antarctica. His photographs are regularly published in National Geographic, where he served as photographer-in-residence. He took thousands of photographs of bonobos, most of which were deemed to be too explicit by the magazine, as the animals engage in frequent sexual activity. Lanter used some of these photographs in his collaboration with Frans de Waal in The Forgotten Ape (1997).

Lanting is also featured in Outdoor Photographer, Audubon, and Life. A 2005 exhibit in the Field Museum of Natural History, entitled Jungles, focused on the plants and animals of the rainforest. His 2006 exhibit, Life: A Journey Through Time, part of the Cabrillo Festival of Contemporary Music in Santa Cruz, California, combined his photography with the music of Philip Glass. A traveling exhibition, Frans Lanting: LIFE began in fall 2006 at the Dutch natural history museum in Leiden, Netherlands. The show then traveled through Europe and the United States.

Lanting is a Fellow of the International League of Conservation Photographers (ILCP).

From May through July 2012 there was an exhibition with 75 photos from Life: A Journey Through Time on the SS Rotterdam in the harbour of Rotterdam.

In August 2012, Lanting became an ambassador of the World Wide Fund for Nature in the Netherlands. On 25 August 2012, a special concert version of LIFE was held in the Concertgebouw in Amsterdam celebrating 50 years of the World Wide Fund for Nature.

== Exhibitions ==
- 29 May – 30 August 1998: "Eye in Eye", Natuurhistorisch Museum Rotterdam
- 5 October 2000 – 14 January 2001: "Jungles", about tropical rainforest, Naturalis in Leiden
- 23 September 2006 – 2 September 2007: "LIFE", a journey through life, Naturalis in Leiden
- 9 June – 4 September 2016: Solo exhibition: Dialogue with Nature, Netherlands Photo Museum in Rotterdam
- January 19–April 30, 2023: Bay of Life: From Wind to Whales, Santa Cruz Museum of Art and History

== Awards ==
- 1988 – World Press Photo
- 1989 – World Press Photo
- 1991 – Wildlife Photographer of the Year
- 1997 – Ansel Adams Award for Conservation Photography Award, Sierra Club
- 1997 – 2nd prize Nature and Environment Stories, World Press Photo
- 1999 – Lanting was awarded an Honorary Fellowship of The Royal Photographic Society in 1999. These are awarded to distinguished persons having, from their position or attainments, an intimate connection with the science or fine art of photography or the application thereof.
- 2001 H.R.H. Prince Bernhard inducted him as a Knight in the Royal Order of the Golden Ark, the Netherlands' highest conservation honor.
- 2005 – Lennart Nilsson Award
- 2008 – Photographer of the Year, Photoimaging Manufacturers and Distributors Association
- 2010 – The Royal Geographical Society's Cherry Kearton Medal and Award
- 2021 – Art/Act Award from the David Brower Center

== Awards ==
- 2015 – WNF-Frans Lanting Award by World Wide Fund for Nature
- 2018 – Wildlife Photographer of the Year Lifetime Achievement Award

== Books ==
- 1982 – Feathers
- 1985 – Islands of the West
- 1990 – The Albatrosses of Midway Island
- 1990 – Madagascar, A World Out of Time
- 1993 – Forgotten Edens, Exploring the World's Wild Places (with Christine Eckstrom)
- 1993 – Okavango, Africa's Last Eden (with Christine Eckstrom)
- 1996 – Animal Athletes
- 1997 – Bonobo, The Forgotten Ape (with Frans de Waal)
- 1997 – Eye to Eye, Intimate Encounters With the Animal World (with Christine Eckstrom)
- 1999 – Living Planet, Preserving Edens of the Earth (with David Doubilet and Galen Rowell)
- 2000 – Jungles (with Christine Eckstrom)
- 2003 – Penguin (with Christine Eckstrom)
- 2006 – LIFE, A Journey Through Time
- 2017 – Into Africa
- 2022 - Bay of Life: From Wind to Whales (with Christine Eckstrom)

== See also ==
- Nature photography
