= Frederick W. Smith =

American business magnate (1944–2025)

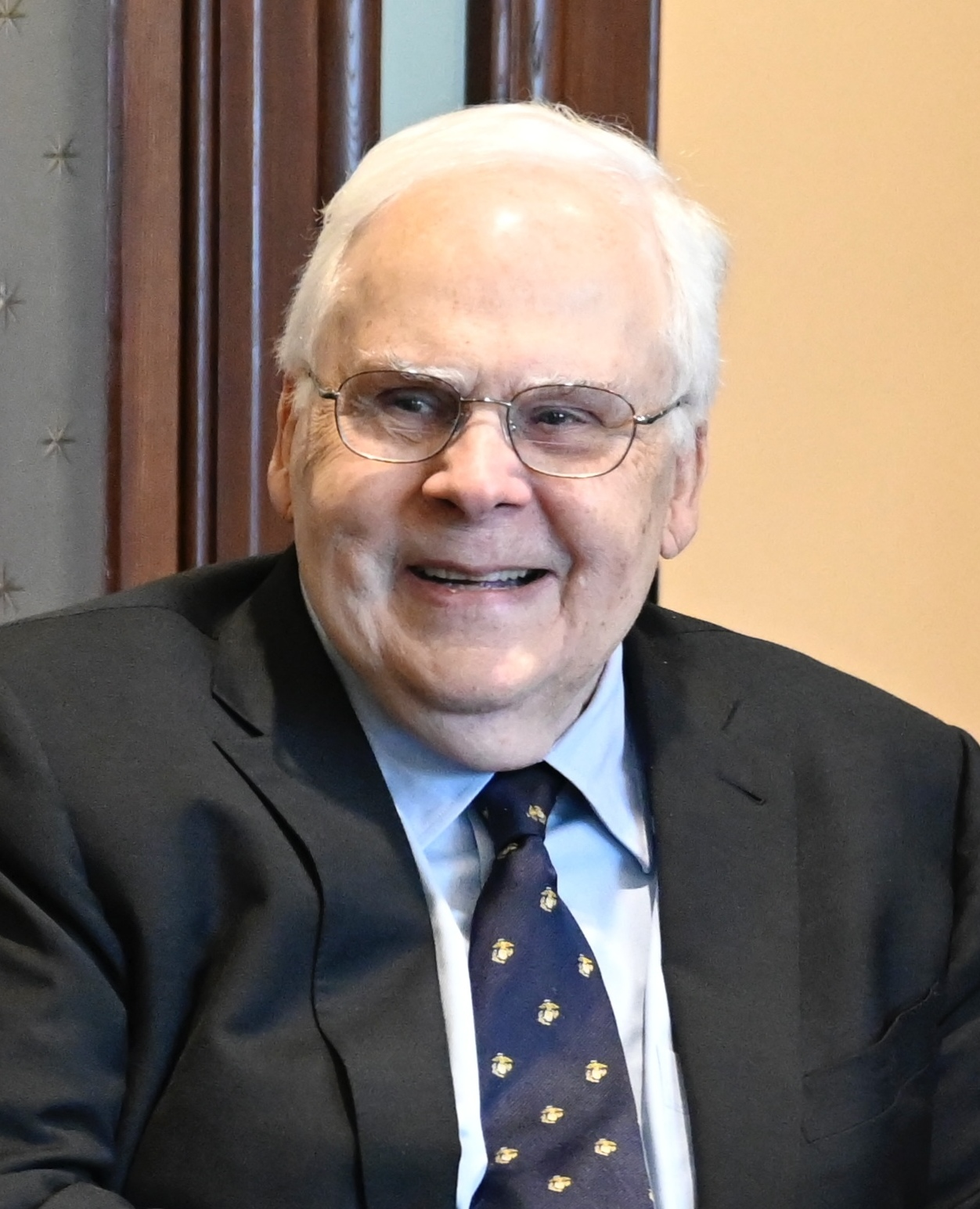
- Smith in 2025
- Born: Frederick Wallace Smith; August 11, 1944; Marks, Mississippi, U.S.
- Died: June 21, 2025 (aged 80); Memphis, Tennessee, U.S.
- Burial place: Arlington National Cemetery
- Education: Yale University (BA)
- Occupations: Business magnate; investor; philanthropist
- Years active: 1971–2022
- Known for: Founder of FedEx Corporation
- Political party: Republican
- Spouses: Linda Black Grisham (m. 1969; div. 1977) Diane Smith (m. 2006)
- Children: 10, including Richard, Arthur, Windland and Molly
- Parents: James F. Smith; Sally Wallace
- Military career
- Allegiance: United States
- Branch: U.S. Marine Corps
- Service years: 1966–1969
- Rank: Captain
- Conflict: Vietnam War (WIA)
- Awards: Silver Star; Bronze Star; Purple Heart (2)

Frederick Wallace Smith (August 11, 1944 – June 21, 2025) was an American business magnate and investor. He was the founder and chairman of FedEx Corporation, the world's largest express transportation company. Smith stepped down as CEO in June 2022 and was succeeded by Raj Subramaniam. Considered one of the most successful transportation entrepreneurs in the world, Smith had an estimated net worth of $5.3 billion at the time of his death according to Forbes.

== Early life ==
Frederick Wallace Smith was born in Marks, Mississippi, on August 11, 1944, the son of James Frederick "Fred" Smith, the founder of the Toddle House restaurant chain and the Smith Motor Coach Company (renamed the Dixie Greyhound Lines after The Greyhound Corporation bought a controlling interest in 1931). The elder Smith died when his son was only four years old, and the boy was raised by his mother and uncles.

Smith was crippled by bone disease at a young age but regained his health by age 10.

Smith attended elementary school at Presbyterian Day School in Memphis and high school at Memphis University School and became an amateur pilot as a teenager. During his teenage years, Smith co-founded Ardent Studios along with childhood friends John Fry and John King. The studio would go on to record a number of seminal soul and rock acts on the Stax label and is closely associated with the acclaimed Memphis band Big Star.

In 1962, Smith entered Yale University to study economics. According to some sources, he wrote a paper for an economics class, outlining overnight delivery service, on which he received a "C". However, in an interview, Smith said that he did not remember the grade. Smith became a member and eventually the president of the Delta Kappa Epsilon (DKE) fraternity and the Skull and Bones secret society. He received his bachelor's degree in economics in 1966. In his college years, Smith was a friend and DKE fraternity brother of future U.S. president George W. Bush. Smith was also friends with future U.S. Senator and Secretary of State John Kerry; the two shared an enthusiasm for aviation and were flying partners.

== Marine Corps service ==
After graduation, Smith was commissioned in the U.S. Marine Corps, serving for three years (from 1966 to 1969) as a platoon commander and a forward air controller (FAC) in South Vietnam, flying in the back seat of the OV-10.

Smith served two tours of duty in the Vietnam War and was honorably discharged in 1969 with the rank of captain, having received the Silver Star, the Bronze Star, and two Purple Hearts.

Smith's Silver Star citation reads:

The President of the United States of America takes pleasure in presenting the Silver Star to First Lieutenant Frederick Wallace Smith, United States Marine Corps, for conspicuous gallantry and intrepidity in action while serving as Commanding Officer of Company K, 3rd Battalion, 5th Marines, 1st Marine Division in connection with operations against the enemy in the Republic of Vietnam. On the morning of 27 May 1968, while conducting a search and destroy operation, Company K became heavily engaged with a North Vietnamese Army battalion occupying well-entrenched emplacements on Gò Nổi Island in Quang Nam Province. As Lieutenant Smith led his men in an aggressive assault upon the enemy positions, the North Vietnamese force launched a determined counterattack, supported by mortars, on the Marines' left flank. Unhesitatingly rushing through the intense hostile fire to the position of heaviest contact, Lieutenant Smith fearlessly removed several casualties from the hazardous area and, shouting words of encouragement to his men, directed their fire upon the advancing enemy soldiers, successfully repulsing the hostile attack. Moving boldly across the fire-swept terrain to an elevated area, he calmly disregarded repeated North Vietnamese attempts to direct upon him as he skillfully adjusted artillery fire and air strikes upon the hostile positions to within fifty meters of his own location and continued to direct the movement of his unit. Accurately assessing the confusion that supporting arms was causing among the enemy soldiers, he raced across the fire-swept terrain to the right flank of his company and led an enveloping attack on the hostile unit's weakest point, routing the North Vietnamese unit and inflicting numerous casualties. His aggressive tactics and calm presence of min [sic] under fire inspired all who observed him and were instrumental in his unit accounting for the capture of two hostile soldiers as well as numerous documents and valuable items of equipment. By his courage, aggressive leadership and unfaltering devotion to duty at great personal risk, Lieutenant Smith upheld the highest traditions of the Marine Corps and of the United States Naval Service."

== Business career ==
In 1970, Smith purchased the controlling interest in an aircraft maintenance company, Ark Aviation Sales, and by 1971 turned its focus to trading used jets. On June 18, 1971, he founded Federal Express with his $4 million inheritance (approximately $32 million in 2025 dollars) and raised $91 million ($724.2 million in 2025 dollars) in venture capital. In 1973, the company began offering service to 25 cities, shipping small packages and documents in a fleet of 14 Dassault Falcon 20 (DA-20) jets. His focus was on developing an integrated air-ground system. Smith developed FedEx on the business idea of a shipment version of a bank clearing house where one bank clearing house was located in the middle of the representative banks and all their representatives would be sent to the central location to exchange materials.

In the early days of FedEx, Smith had to go to great lengths to keep the company afloat. In one instance, after a crucial business loan was denied, he took the company's last $5,000 to Las Vegas and won $27,000 gambling on blackjack to cover the company's $24,000 fuel bill. It kept FedEx alive for one more week.

In 2003 Smith, along with Robert Rothman and Dwight Schar, purchased a minority share of the Washington Redskins, an American football franchise belonging to the National Football League. The three owned a total of 40% of the team until 2021, when they sold their stake to majority owner Dan Snyder following discontentment with Snyder. Smith also owned or co-owned several other entertainment companies, such as Alcon Entertainment.

Smith served as owner of the Memphis Mad Dogs of the Canadian Football League in 1995. He also served as a special sponsor for the 2023 revival of the Memphis Showboats, a team that played in single-entity leagues that did not have individual owners.

In 2000, Smith made an appearance as himself in the Tom Hanks movie Cast Away, when Hanks's character is welcomed back, which was filmed on location at FedEx's home facilities in Memphis, Tennessee. As a DKE fraternity brother of George W. Bush while at Yale, there was some speculation after Bush's 2000 election that Smith might be appointed to the Bush Cabinet as Defense Secretary. While Smith was Bush's first choice for the position, he declined for medical reasons — Donald Rumsfeld was named instead. Although Smith was friends with both 2004 major candidates, John Kerry and George W. Bush, Smith chose to endorse Bush's re-election in 2004. When Bush decided to replace Rumsfeld, Smith was offered the position again, but he declined in order to spend time with his terminally ill daughter.

Smith was a supporter of Senator John McCain's 2008 presidential bid, and was named national co-chairman of his campaign committee.

Smith was inducted into the Junior Achievement U.S. Business Hall of Fame and also awarded the Golden Plate Award of the American Academy of Achievement in 1998. He was inducted into the SMEI Sales & Marketing Hall of Fame in 2000. His other awards include "CEO of the Year 2004" by the magazine Chief Executive and the 2008 Kellogg Award for Distinguished Leadership, presented by the Kellogg School of Management on May 29, 2008. He was also awarded the 2008 Bower Award for Business Leadership from The Franklin Institute in Philadelphia, Pennsylvania. He was the 2011 recipient of the Tony Jannus Award for distinguished contributions to commercial aviation.

While CEO of FedEx in 2008, Smith earned a total compensation of $10,434,589, which included a base salary of $1,430,466, a cash bonus of $2,705,000, stocks granted of $0, and options granted of $5,461,575. In June 2009, Smith expressed interest in purchasing the controlling share (60%) of the St. Louis Rams from Chip Rosenbloom and Lucia Rodriguez. In 2009, Smith earned a total compensation of $7,740,658, which included a base salary of $1,355,028, a cash bonus of $0, stocks granted of $0, options granted of $5,079,191, and other compensation totaling $1,306,439.

In March 2014, Fortune ranked him 26th among the list of the "World's 50 Greatest Leaders".

In March 2022, Smith announced that he would step down as CEO and become executive chairman. He named long-time FedEx executive Raj Subramaniam as his successor.

== Forgery indictment and car crash ==
On January 31, 1975, Fred Smith was indicted for forgery by a federal grand jury. The suit was filed by Smith's two half-sisters. The lawsuit alleged Smith had forged documents to obtain a $2 million bank loan and he and executives of his family's trust fund had sold stock from the fund for a loss of $14 million. A warrant for Smith's arrest was issued for which Smith posted bond with federal authorities in Memphis. Smith was later found not guilty on the forgery charge.

The same evening of his forgery indictment Smith was involved in a fatal hit and run in which he killed a 54-year-old handyman named George C. Sturghill. Smith was arrested and charged with leaving the scene of a crash and driving with an expired license. He was released on a $250 bond. All charges were later dismissed.

This was not the first time Smith was involved in a fatal car crash. During his first summer break from Yale, Smith was back in Memphis driving out to a lake with friends when he lost control of the car he was driving, causing the vehicle to flip and killing the passenger in the front seat. The cause of the crash was never determined.

== Personal life and death ==
Smith had 10 children, including photographer Windland Smith Rice, film producer Molly Smith, and current Ohio State offensive coordinator Arthur Smith. Smith stepped down as CEO in 2022 but remained executive chairman.

Smith died in Memphis on June 21, 2025, at age 80. He was buried with full military honors at Arlington National Cemetery on October 3, 2025.
