= Raj Subramaniam =

Indian-American businessman (born 1967)

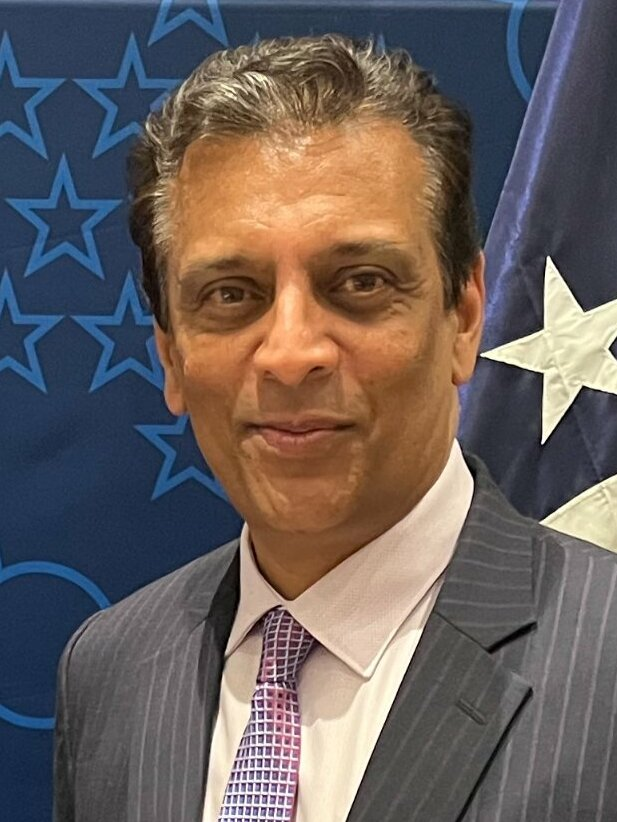
- Subramaniam in 2023
- Born: September 14, 1967 (age 59); Thiruvananthapuram, Kerala, India
- Education: Indian Institute of Technology, Bombay (BTech); Syracuse University (MS); University of Texas, Austin (MBA)
- Occupation: Business executive
- Years active: 1991–present
- Organization: FedEx
- Title: CEO
- Predecessor: Fred Smith
- Website: Official website

Rajesh "Raj" Subramaniam (born September 14, 1967) is an Indian-American business executive who is the chief executive officer and president of the FedEx Corporation. Prior to this position, he held many organizational management and marketing roles in Asia and the United States at FedEx.

== Early life and education ==
Subramaniam was born on September 14, 1967, in Thiruvananthapuram, India into a Hindu family. His father worked in the Indian Police Service and his mother worked as a doctor in Kerala Health Services. He attended the Loyola School in the city. At age 15, he moved to Mumbai, where he completed his high school at SIES College of Arts, Science and Commerce, Sion(W), and afterwards attended IIT Bombay, graduating with a B.Tech. in chemical engineering in 1987.

He moved to the United States on a scholarship to Syracuse University and earned an MS in chemical engineering in 1989. He also earned an MBA from the University of Texas at Austin during the early 1990s recession. His father retired as DGP of Kerala and his mother as additional director, Kerala Health Services. His wife Uma and his brother Rajeev also work at FedEx.

== Career ==
Subramaniam joined FedEx in 1991 as an associate marketing analyst. He quickly rose through the ranks and held several management and marketing roles in Asia and the US. Beginning in 1996, he served as the vice-president of Marketing at FedEx Express in the Asia-Pacific region (based in Singapore), and was then appointed the regional president of Mississauga based FedEx Canada in 2003. From 2013 to 2019, he served as the Executive VP, marketing and communication.

In 2018, Subramaniam was promoted to the CEO of FedEx's legacy Express business. After retirement of David J. Bronczek in 2019, Subramaniam was named the COO. He joined the FedEx board in 2020.

Subramaniam replaced FedEx founder Fred Smith as the president and CEO on June 1, 2022. In 2023, Subramaniam's total compensation at FedEx was $13.2 million, or 289 times the median employee pay at FedEx for that year.

Subramaniam serves on the board of directors of FedEx Corporation, FIRST, the United States Chamber of Commerce's China Center Advisory Board, US-India Strategic Partnership Forum, and the US-China Business Council. He is also a member of The Business Council and the President's Export Council.
