= Galen Rowell =

American wilderness photographer, mountaineer, and author (1940–2002)

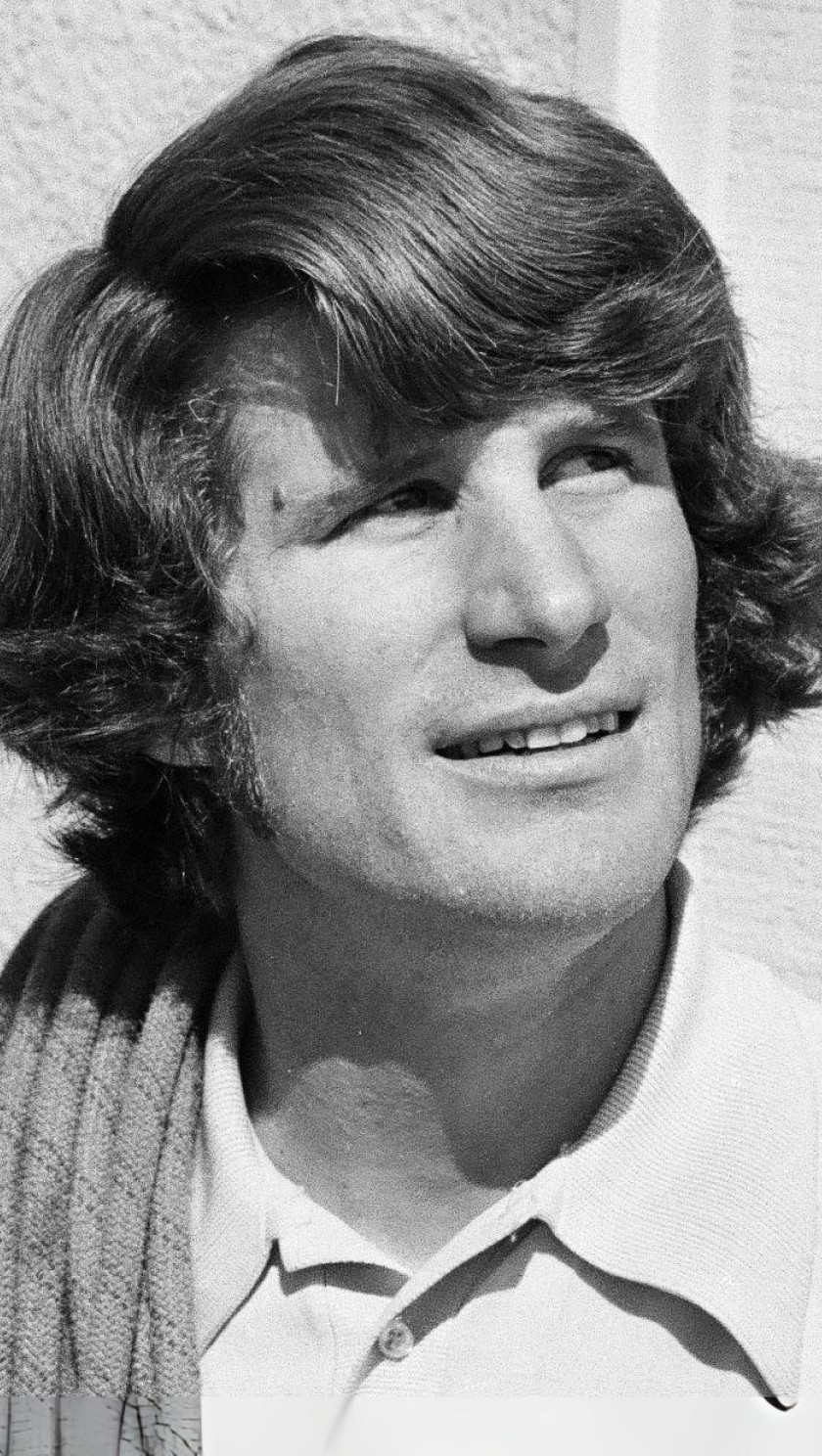
- Rowell in 1974
- Born: Galen Avery Rowell; August 23, 1940; Oakland, California, US
- Died: August 11, 2002 (aged 61); Bishop, California, US
- Education: Berkeley High School
- Occupations: Photographer, Climber

Galen Avery Rowell (August 23, 1940 – August 11, 2002) was an American wilderness photographer, adventure photojournalist and mountaineer. Born in Oakland, California, he became a full-time photographer in 1972.

== Early life and education ==
Rowell was introduced to the wilderness at a very young age and he completed his first roped climb in Yosemite Valley when he was 16. For the rest of his life, he climbed mountains and explored landscapes. He began taking pictures on excursions into the wild so that he could share his experiences with friends and family. After graduating from Berkeley High School in 1958, he stayed in Berkeley to study at the University of California but dropped out to pursue climbing.

== Career ==
In 1972, Rowell sold his small automotive business and became a full-time photographer. Within a year, he had completed his first major assignment, published as the June 1974 cover story for National Geographic. The story originated from an invitation by fellow photographer Dewitt Jones to help him on an assignment, when Jones was called away and Rowell suggested an ascent of Yosemite National Park's Half Dome that he documented by himself. When National Geographic received the pictures, they decided to do a story separate from Jones', thus Rowell got his start. He pioneered a new kind of photography in which he was not merely an observer, but considered himself a participant in the scenes that he photographed – he considered the landscape part of the adventure, and the adventure part of the landscape.

Rowell won the Ansel Adams Award for Conservation Photography in 1984. He had numerous photographic assignments for Life, National Geographic, Outdoor Photographer, and various other publications. Rowell was also a highly regarded writer on subjects ranging from photography, humanitarian and environmental issues, human visual cognition, and mountaineering, publishing numerous magazine articles and eighteen books in his lifetime. His In the Throne Room of the Mountain Gods about the history of mountaineering on K2 (1977) is considered a classic of mountaineering literature, and his 1986 book Mountain Light: In Search of the Dynamic Landscape is one of the best selling how-to photo books. As an energetic advocate for the causes in which he believed, Rowell served on multiple advisory and directors' boards for organizations ranging from the Committee of 100 for Tibet to the World Wildlife Fund.

Rowell was particularly keen on seeking out and photographing optical phenomena in the natural world. He referred to his landscape photographs as "dynamic landscapes," due to both the fast-changing nature of light and conditions and his energetic pursuit of the best camera position at the optimal moment. Rowell wrote about the quest for such images in Mountain Light, and also in Galen Rowell's Vision (1993) and Inner Game of Outdoor Photography (2001).

A retrospective book on his life, career, and impact on the various worlds he touched was published by Sierra Club Books.

=== Photography techniques and equipment ===
From 1968, he used 35mm Nikon cameras and lenses almost exclusively for their reliability and portability. His primary medium was color slide film, beginning with Kodachrome in the late 1960s through the 1980s, and Fuji Velvia following its introduction in 1990.

Rowell conceived a technical approach of extending the dynamic range captured on film. He developed a set of graduated neutral density filters produced by filter manufacturer Singh-Ray. They were sold under his name and became a standard for dealing with high contrast scenes.

Galen Rowell mastered the technique of using balanced fill flash, allowing him to subtly lighten the deepest shadows to match the relatively narrow dynamic range of color reversal film.

== Death ==
Rowell, his wife – photographer, author and pilot Barbara Cushman Rowell,– pilot Tom Reid, and Reid's friend Carol McAffee were all killed in a plane crash in Inyo County near Eastern Sierra Regional Airport in Bishop, California, at 01:23 am on August 11, 2002. The Rowells were returning from a photography workshop in the Bering Sea area of Alaska on a flight that had originated in Oakland, California. The National Transportation Safety Board determined (NTSB report LAX02FA251) that Reid had only 52 hours in the Aero Commander 690 and only 1.6 hours at night. He was not certified for carrying passengers at night at the time of the accident. The aircraft crashed after it was unintentionally stalled (aerodynamically) during the turn from base to final approach for runway 30, within a quarter mile of the runway threshold. The Rowells' business, Mountain Light Photography Gallery in Bishop, California, continued to operate, owned by Galen's children Nicole Ryan and Tony Rowell and Barbara's brother Robert Cushman until October 2017, first under General Manager and Curator Justin Black until June 2009 and subsequently under General Manager Kevin Calder until 2017.

== Mountaineering achievements ==
- More than 100 first ascents of technical climbs in the Sierra Nevada
- First one-day ascent of Denali (during which his camera froze)
- First ski circumnavigation of Denali
- First one-day ascent of Kilimanjaro
- First ascent of Great Trango Tower in Pakistan's Karakoram Himalaya
- Second ascent of the Amne Machin peak in 1981 with Harold Knutsen and Kim Schmitz, reporting its true altitude at 20,610 feet.
- First ascent of Cholatse, the final major peak climbed in the Everest region
- First ascents of numerous lesser-known but challenging peaks around the world, including the Andes, Alaska, Pakistan's Karakoram Himalaya, Tibet, Nepal, China, Greenland, etc.
- Oldest person to climb Yosemite's El Capitan in one day at age 57

== Awards ==
- Rowell was the winner of the Sierra Club's Francis P. Farquhar Mountaineering Award for 1977.
- In 1984, the Sierra Club honored Rowell with the Ansel Adams Award for Conservation Photography.
- He was inducted into the California Outdoors Hall of Fame preceding his death in 2002.
- Rowell was posthumously inducted into the fellowship of the International League of Conservation Photographers as an Honorary Fellow in 2009.

== See also ==
- Nature photography
- Wildlife photography
