= John Muir's High Sierra =

1974 film

- Directed by: Dewitt Jones
- Produced by: Lesley Foster; Dewitt Jones
- Music by: Mike Iseberg
- Production companies: Dewitt Jones Productions for the Yosemite Institute and the National Park Service
- Distributed by: Pyramid Films
- Release date: 1974
- Running time: 22 minutes
- Country: United States
- Language: English

John Muir's High Sierra is a 1974 American short documentary film directed by Dewitt Jones produced by Dewitt Jones and Lesley Foster. It was nominated for an Oscar for Best Documentary Short Subject.

== See also ==
- List of American films of 1974
