= Fritz Pölking =

German nature photographer, author and book publisher

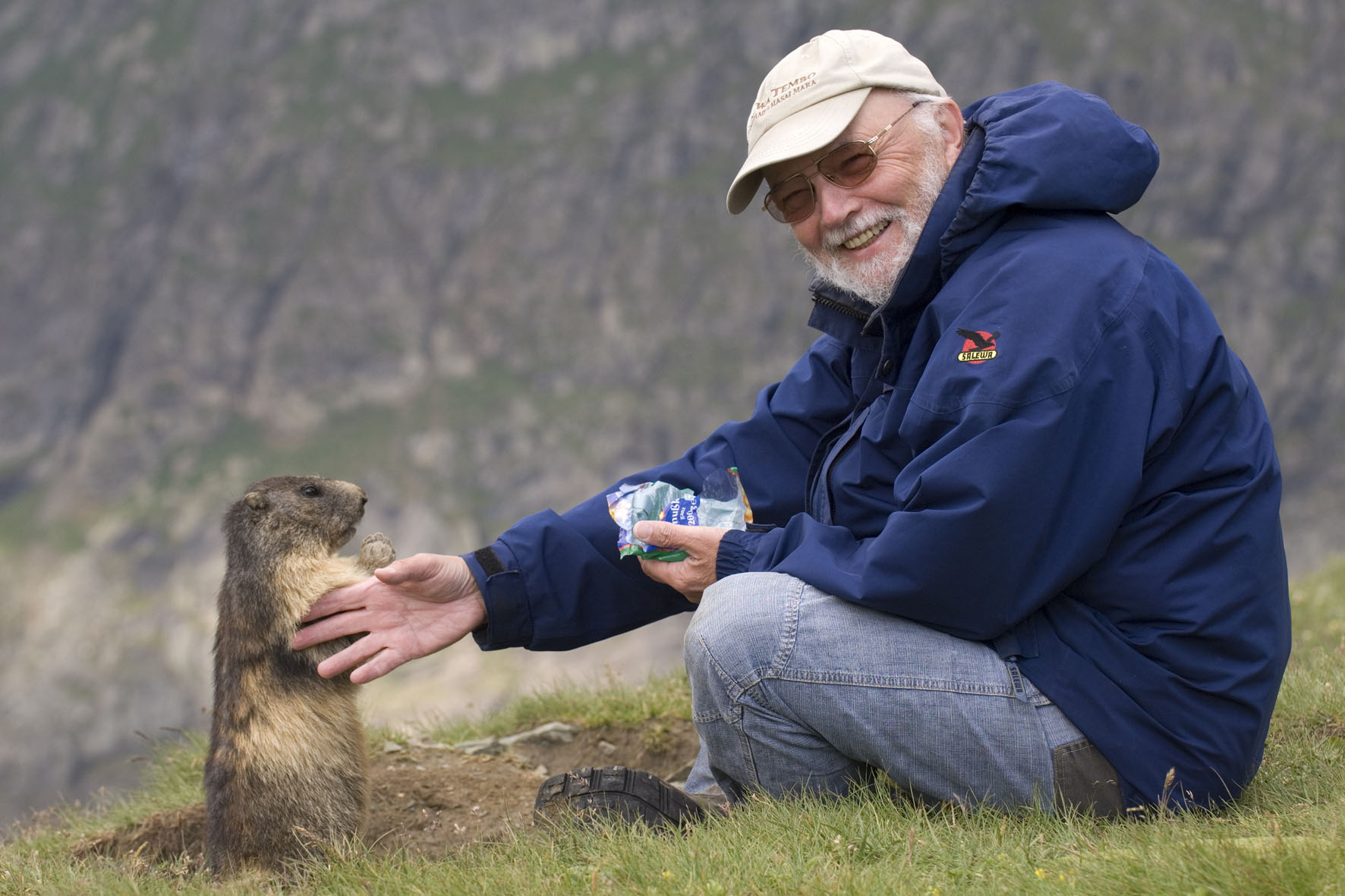
Fritz Pölking (2007)

Fritz Pölking (* 30 January 1936 in Krefeld; died 16 July 2007 in Greven) was a German nature photographer, author and book publisher.

== Biography ==
Fritz Pölking was a certified German Master of Photography ("Fotografenmeister") who started publishing books and journals on nature.

His magazine "Tier- und Naturfotografie“ ("Photography of Animals and Nature") was the predecessor of "NaturFoto“ which is nowadays published by the Tecklenborg Verlag.

Fritz Pölking was also one of the founders of the "Gesellschaft Deutscher Tierfotografen e. V." (German Society of Nature Photographers)

He lived with his wife Gisela (likewise nature photographer) in Greven in Westphalia.

His photographs have been published in journals including National Geographic, Journal of Zoology and Australian Geographic.

In 1977 he won the BBC Wildlife Photographer of the Year Competition was declared Wildlife Photographer of the Year.

When a cardiac arrest caused his death in 2007 he left a body of work of 30 books including the German/English work Am Puls des Lebens/At the pulse of life (ISBN 3-88949-201-0).

In 2008 the GDT and the publishing house Tecklenborg launched the Fritz Pölking Award and the Fritz Pölking Junior Award.
