= Outdoor Photographer =

American nature photography magazine

- Cover of the June–July 2023 issue, photo taken at Bryce Canyon National Park by Dave Welling
- Categories: Photography
- Frequency: 4 per year
- Founder: Steve Werner
- Founded: 1985
- Company: Titles JCMJ, LLC
- Country: United States
- Based in: Cambridge, Massachusetts
- Language: English
- ISSN: 0890-5304
- OCLC: 14255205

Outdoor Photographer is an American nature photography magazine. It was published eleven times per year, monthly, save for a combined January/February issue and relaunched in 2025 as a quarterly.

== History and profile ==
Outdoor Photographer was founded by Steve Werner and first published in 1985. In 2000, it had roughly 172,000 regular subscribers. Regular contributors have included Galen Rowell, Frans Lanting, Dewitt Jones, William Neill, Amy Gulick, Justin Black, and QT Luong.

In July 2014, columnist Bob Krist revealed that he was not paid by the magazine in over a year. Many other contributors were awaiting payment as well, and the magazine stopped responding to payment requests. In July 2015, an announcement was made that the magazine was acquired by the Boston-based publishing company Madavor Media. Shortly after the announcement, former contributors were contacted and promised that information would soon be provided about how to recover fees owed by the former owner. The headquarters of the magazine is in Braintree, Massachusetts.

In 2023, it was revealed that multiple contributors had not been paid for months. In February of that year, the BeBop Channel Corporation acquired Madavor Media, including all its photography-related publications: Outdoor Photographer, Digital Photo Pro, Digital Photo, the Image Creators Network, and Imaging Resource. In May, Outdoor Photographer Magazine Editor-in-Chief Dan Havlik confirmed that all the magazine's staff had been laid off and that the June/July issue would be Outdoor Photographer's final issue. BeBop subsequently announced that on February 29, 2024, it transferred ownership of Outdoor Photographer, along with several other former Madavor Titles to "Titles JCMJ, LLC".

In August 2025, Outdoor Photographer officially relaunched, again with Editor-in-Chief Dan Havlik but under the management of UK-based BGFG. Payment requests from former contributors remain unanswered and the new management maintains that old liabilities remain with the prior owner, and thus cannot be settled.
