= Molly Smith (producer) =

American film producer

Molly Smith (born March 12, 1981) is an American film producer. She runs Black Label Media, with partners Trent and Thad Luckinbill.

Smith is the daughter of FedEx founder Frederick W. Smith and the sister to Windland Smith Rice, a photographer, and Arthur Smith, the current offensive coordinator at Ohio State.

== Filmography ==
- P.S. I Love You (2007)
- The Blind Side (2009, executive)
- Something Borrowed (2011)
- Choose You (2011, executive)
- Beautiful Creatures (2013)
- Begin Again (2013, executive)
- The Good Lie (2014)
- You're Not You (2014)
- Breaking a Monster (2015)
- Sicario (2015)
- Demolition (2015)
- La La Land (2016, executive)
- Love and the Line (2016, short, executive)
- Rebel in the Rye (2017)
- Only the Brave (2017)
- 12 Strong (2018)
- Sicario: Day of the Soldado (2018)
- Sierra Burgess Is a Loser (2018)
- Broken Diamonds (2021)
- Devotion (2022)
- Whitney Houston: I Wanna Dance with Somebody (2022)
- Die My Love (2025)
