= Tecklenborg Verlag =

German publishing house

- Industry: Publishing
- Headquarters: Steinfurt, North Rhine-Westphalia, Germany
- Products: Journals, books

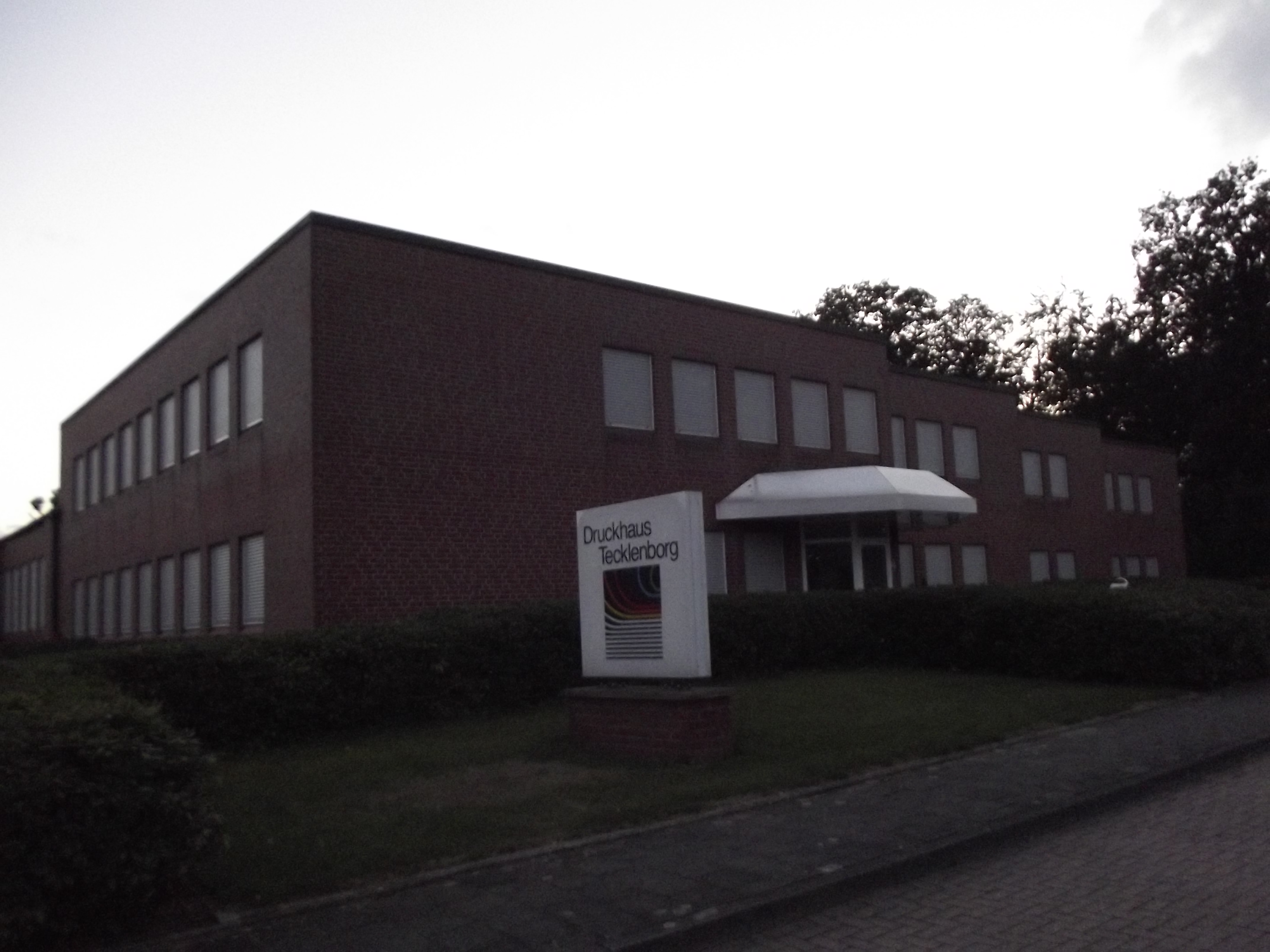
Company building

Tecklenborg Verlag is a publishing house based in Steinfurt, North Rhine-Westphalia, Germany that is internationally recognized for its illustrated books on wild animals, and for their nature-related magazines, which include Naturfoto and Terra.

Books by internationally renowned photographers such as Fritz Pölking have been released within its program. It also publishes an annual collection of photos from the latest Wildlife Photographer of the Year competition.
