= Arthur Smith (American football, born 1982) =

American football player and coach (born 1982)

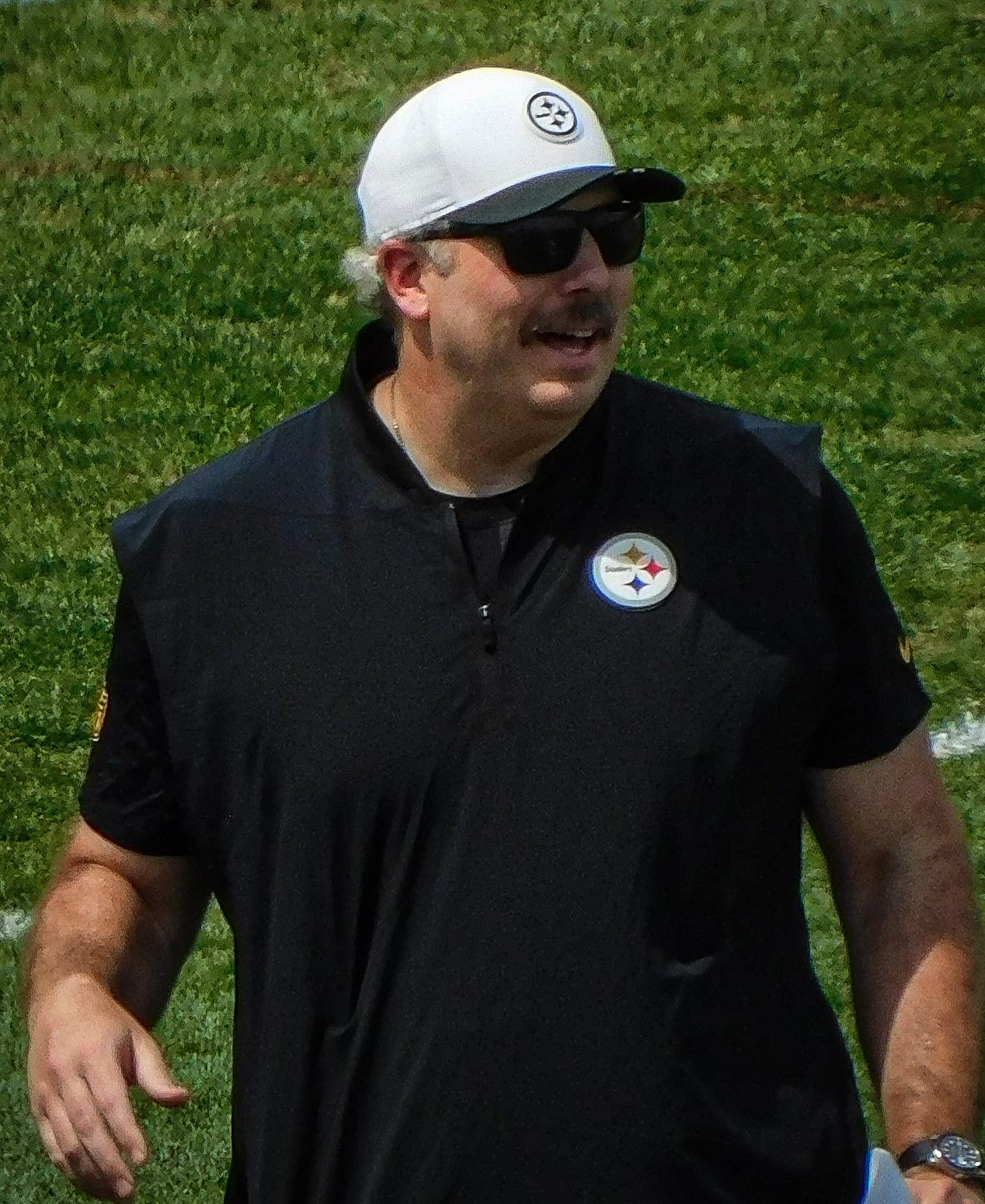
- Smith with the Pittsburgh Steelers in 2025

Current position
- Title: Offensive coordinator
- Team: Ohio State
- Conference: Big Ten

Biographical details
- Born: May 27, 1982 (age 44); Memphis, Tennessee, U.S.

Playing career
- 2001–2005: North Carolina
- Position: Offensive lineman

Coaching career (HC unless noted)
- 2006: North Carolina (GA)
- 2007–2008: Washington Redskins (DQC)
- 2010: Ole Miss (DA/admin. assistant)
- 2011: Tennessee Titans (DQC)
- 2012: Tennessee Titans (OQC)
- 2013: Tennessee Titans (assistant OL)
- 2014–2015: Tennessee Titans (assistant TE)
- 2016–2018: Tennessee Titans (TE)
- 2019–2020: Tennessee Titans (OC)
- 2021–2023: Atlanta Falcons
- 2024–2025: Pittsburgh Steelers (OC)
- 2026–present: Ohio State (OC)

Head coaching record
- Overall: NFL: 21–30

Arthur William Smith (born May 27, 1982) is an American football coach who is the offensive coordinator for Ohio State. He previously served as the offensive coordinator for the Pittsburgh Steelers in 2024 and 2025, the head coach of the Atlanta Falcons from 2021 to 2023, an assistant coach for the Tennessee Titans from 2011 to 2020, and an assistant coach for the Washington Redskins in 2007 and 2008.

== Early life and college ==
Smith was born in Memphis, Tennessee, on May 27, 1982. His father was FedEx founder Frederick W. Smith.

Smith attended Georgetown Preparatory School in North Bethesda, Maryland, where he played on the offensive line and was team captain. He also saw some action at defensive tackle. Smith also participated in track, lacrosse, and basketball. In his high school career, Smith was a first-team all-state selection at offensive line, two-time all-conference, and first-team All-Metro by The Washington Post. During his time at Georgetown, he was known as the “delivery man” due to his father’s business ventures.

Smith was a guard for North Carolina from 2001 to 2005. He was a redshirt freshman in 2001. Smith only played in a single game for the 2002 season as he was diagnosed with a foot problem and did not play the remainder of the season. Smith had foot surgery in January 2003 and missed the entire 2003 season. Smith saw little action in 2004 and in 2005.

== Coaching career ==
=== Early career ===
After graduating in 2006, Smith became a graduate assistant for North Carolina.

Smith began his NFL coaching career in 2007, when he became the defensive quality control coach for the Washington Redskins. His father, FedEx founder Frederick W. Smith, was a minority owner of the team. Smith would stay at that position through 2008.

In 2010, Smith was hired as a defensive intern and administrative assistant for Ole Miss.

=== Tennessee Titans ===
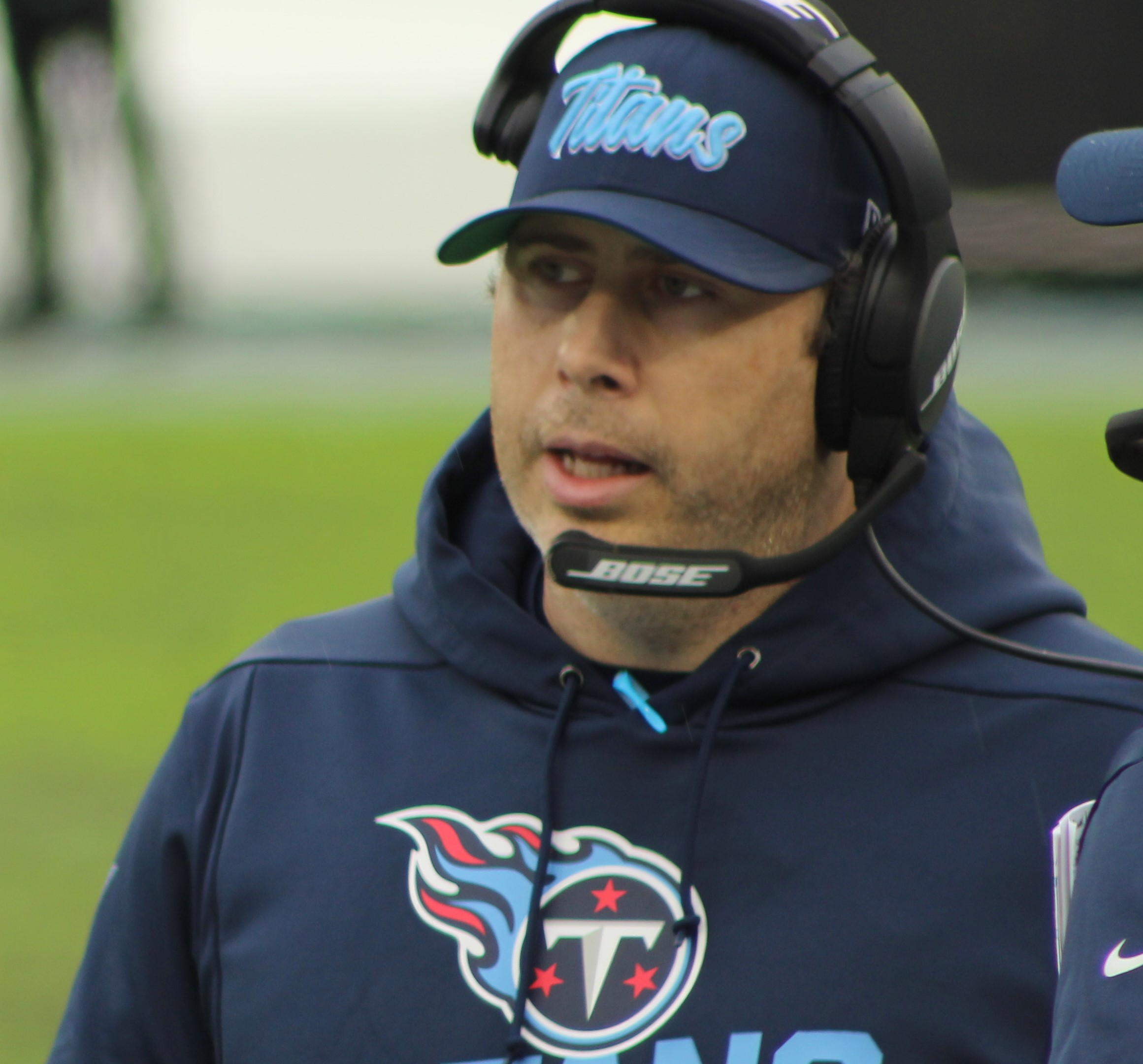
Smith in 2019

Smith was hired to become the defensive quality control coach for the Tennessee Titans in 2011 under new head coach Mike Munchak. Smith then became the offensive quality coach the following season.

In 2013, Smith was promoted to the assistant offensive line and assistant tight ends coach. Munchak was fired after the 2013 season and new head coach Ken Whisenhunt retained Smith as the assistant tight ends coach. Midway through the 2015 season, Whisenhunt was fired and replaced by tight ends coach Mike Mularkey. Mularkey was kept as head coach for the 2016 season and Smith was promoted to the new tight ends coach. When Mularkey was fired after the 2017 season, new head coach Mike Vrabel kept Smith as the tight ends coach for 2018.

On January 21, 2019, Smith was promoted to offensive coordinator, replacing Matt LaFleur, who departed to become head coach of the Green Bay Packers two weeks prior. In his first year as offensive coordinator, Smith oversaw the highest-scoring Titans team in 16 years, with Derrick Henry, Ryan Tannehill, and Jonnu Smith having career years. Smith was praised for his play-calling in the Titans' 28–12 road victory over the top-seeded Baltimore Ravens in the AFC Divisional Round. In 2020, the Titans ranked fourth in scoring and second in total yards.

=== Atlanta Falcons ===
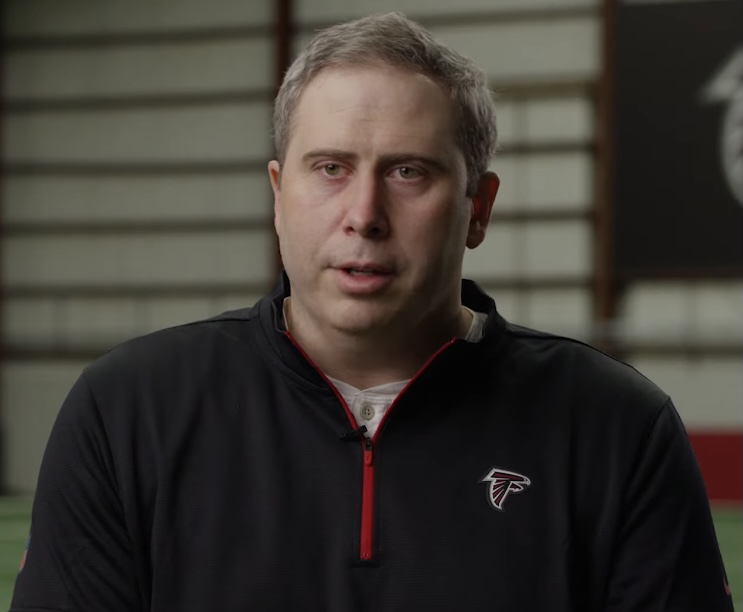
Smith in 2021

On January 15, 2021, Smith was hired to become the head coach of the Atlanta Falcons. On September 12, Smith lost in his head coaching debut against the Philadelphia Eagles by a score of 32–6. Two weeks later, Smith received his first career win as a head coach in a 17–14 victory over the New York Giants. The Falcons finished third in the NFC South with a 7–10 record and did not qualify for the playoffs.

In his second season, Smith led the Falcons to another 7–10 record as the team finished fourth in the NFC South and did not qualify for the playoffs. Smith was widely criticized by various media outlets throughout the 2023 season for failing to utilize highly drafted players such as tight end Kyle Pitts, wide receiver Drake London, and running back Bijan Robinson. The Falcons finished the season with their third consecutive 7–10 record under Smith. This also extended the Falcons' streak of missing the playoffs to six consecutive seasons, resulting in Smith's firing on January 8, 2024.

=== Pittsburgh Steelers ===
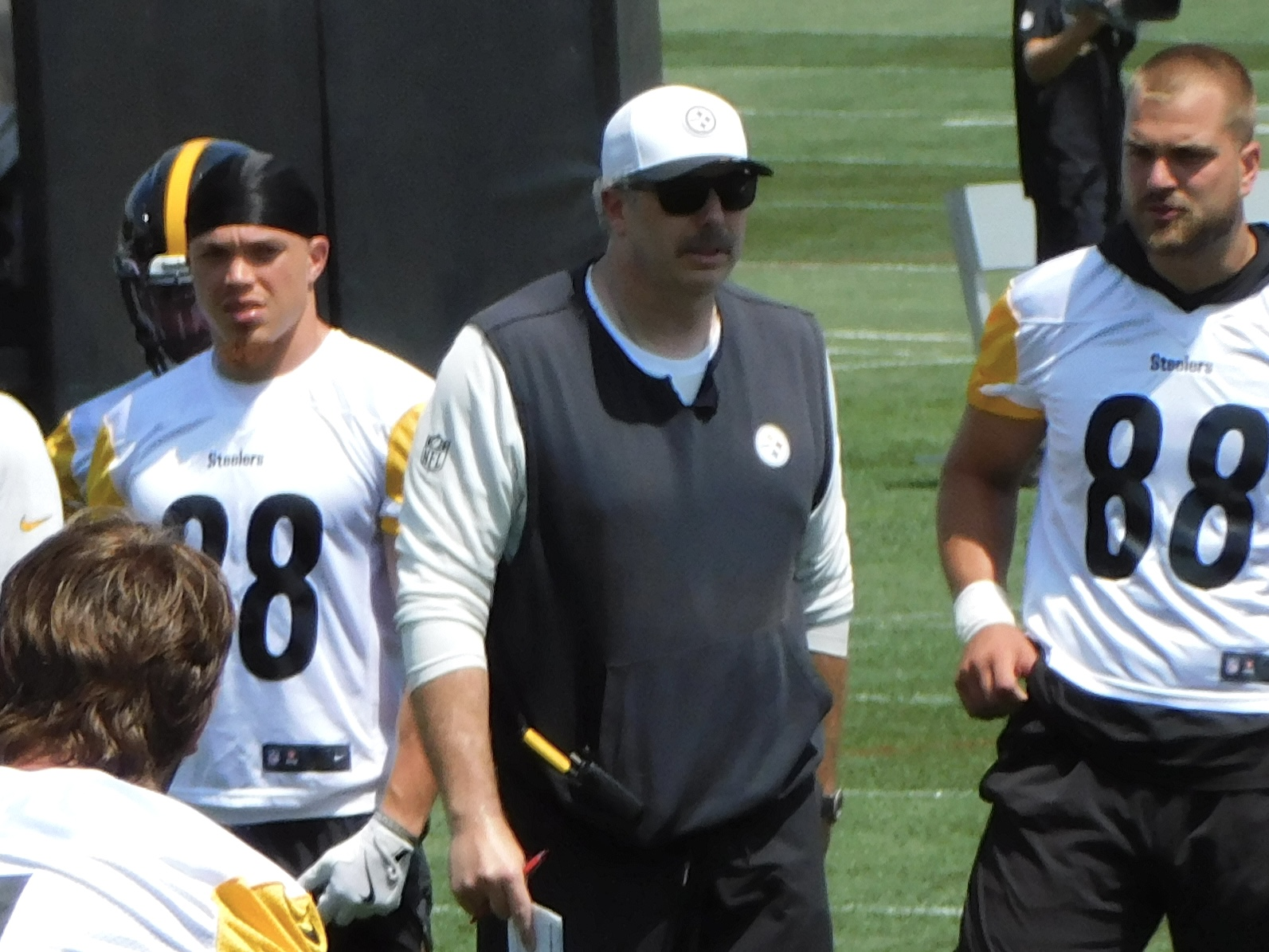
Smith in 2025

On February 2, 2024, the Pittsburgh Steelers hired Smith to be their new offensive coordinator.

In 2024, the Steelers achieved 5.02 yards per play, a slight decrease from 2023 with 5.3. The offense produced 317.2 yards per game, ranking them 23rd in the NFL and scored an average of 22.4 points per game. Between quarterbacks Justin Fields and Russell Wilson, there were 21 total touchdown passes, an increase from 13 the previous season. Under Smith, tight end Pat Freiermuth led the team in touchdown receptions with seven.

Ahead of the 2025 season, the Steelers' offense underwent several changes including making new additions such as revamping their quarterback room by acquiring Aaron Rodgers and Mason Rudolph, as well as drafting running back Kaleb Johnson. The team also acquired former Dolphins' tight end Jonnu Smith, who previously played under Smith with the Titans from 2017 to 2020 and the Falcons in 2023.

=== Ohio State ===
On January 31, 2026, Smith was hired as the offensive coordinator at Ohio State under head coach Ryan Day.

== Head coaching record ==
| Team | Year | Regular season | | | | | Postseason | | | |
| Team | Year | Won | Lost | Ties | Win % | Finish | Won | Lost | Win % | Result |
|---|---|---|---|---|---|---|---|---|---|---|
| ATL | 2021 | 7 | 10 | 0 | .412 | 3rd in NFC South | — | — | — | — |
| ATL | 2022 | 7 | 10 | 0 | .412 | 4th in NFC South | — | — | — | — |
| ATL | 2023 | 7 | 10 | 0 | .412 | 3rd in NFC South | — | — | — | — |
| Total | | 21 | 30 | 0 | .412 | | 0 | 0 | .000 | |

== Personal life ==
Smith and his wife, Allison, reside in Pittsburgh, Pennsylvania, with their three children: Tanner, Sophie, and Liam. His paternal grandfather, James Frederick "Fred" Smith, founded the now-defunct Toddle House restaurant chain that served as the inspiration for the modern day Waffle House chain. Smith has nine siblings, including sisters Windland Smith Rice and Molly Smith.
