= Nature's Best Photography =

- Frequency: 2 per year
- Founder: Steven B. Freligh
- Founded: 1995
- Country: United States
- Based in: McLean, Virginia
- Language: English
- Website: www.naturesbestphotography.org

Nature's Best Photography is a magazine based in McLean, Virginia. Its primary focus is to inspire greater understanding and stewardship of nature through the art of photography.

== History and profile ==
Launched as an annual publication in 1995 by current editor-in-chief and publisher Stephen B. Freligh, Nature's Best Photography is published semi-annually on high-quality glossy oversized paper.

In 1996, the Nature's Best International Photography Awards (now the Nature's Best Photography Windland Smith Rice International Photography Awards) was created as an annual competition to recognize outstanding nature photography and foster the efforts of photographers worldwide, as well as further conservation awareness. Past winners and honorees of the competition include Rodney Lough Jr., Jeremy Woodhouse, Fritz Pölking, Kevin Schafer, Howard G. Buffett and Thorsten Milse. Today, the competition has grown to be recognized as one of the world's most respected photo competitions. Select competition winners' photographs are exhibited annually at the Smithsonian National Museum of Natural History in Washington, D.C.
