= David J. Bronczek =

American businessman

David J. Bronczek is an American businessman who was the President and COO of FedEx Corporation until March 1, 2019; replaced by Raj Subramaniam. He began working at FedEx in 1976 as a courier, and held top jobs in Canada and Europe before returning to headquarters in Memphis in early 1998 to become the executive vice president and chief operating officer. In October 1999 he was selected to become the president and chief executive of FedEx Express, one of the three operating companies in the Federal Express Corporation, as of January 2000.
