= Dewitt Jones =

American photojournalist and filmmaker

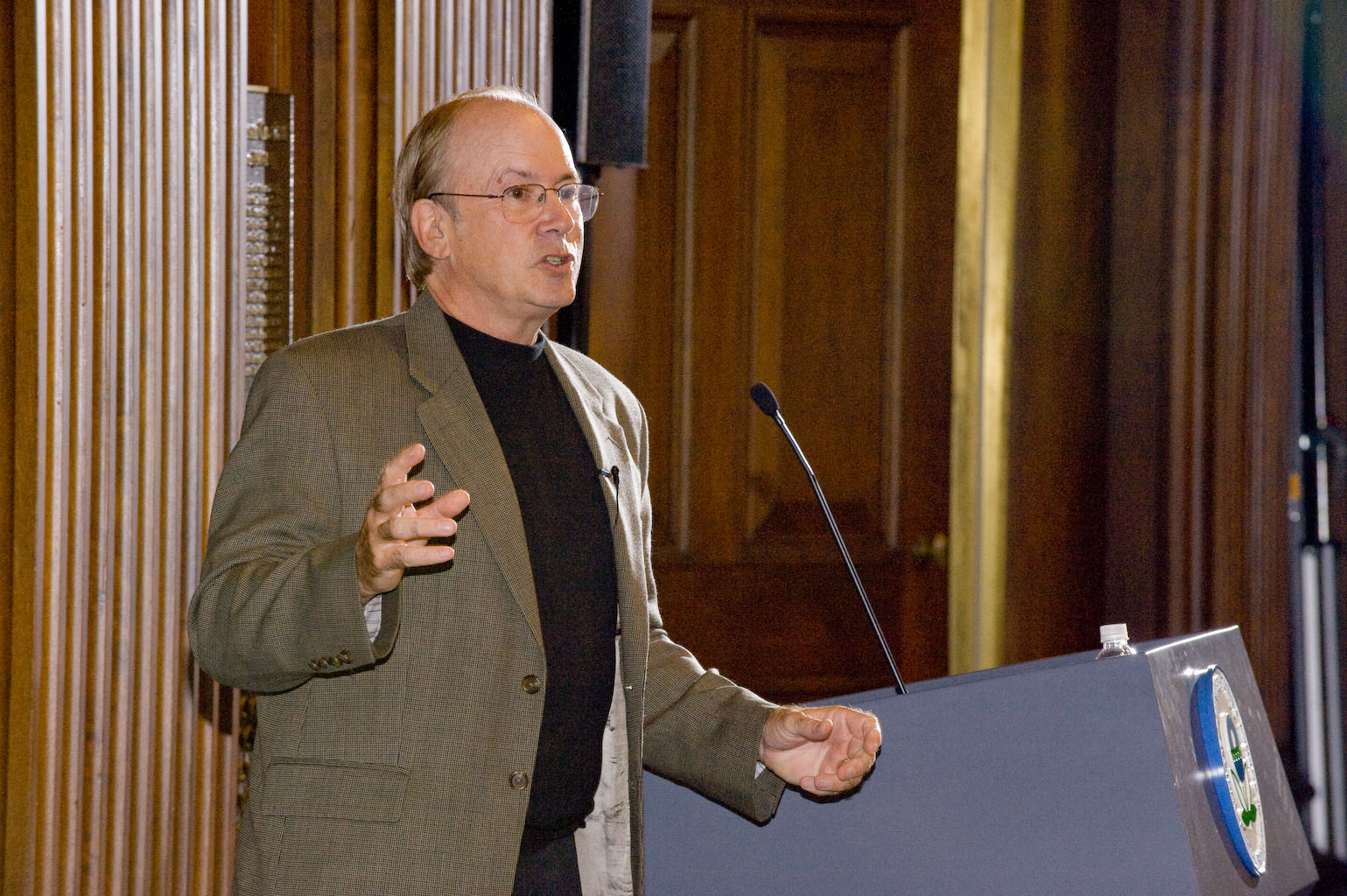
Jones in 2008

Dewitt Jones is an American professional photographer, writer, film director and public speaker, who is known for his work as a freelance photojournalist for National Geographic and his column in Outdoor Photographer Magazine. He produced and directed two films nominated for Academy Awards: Climb (1974), nominated for Best Live Action Short Film, and John Muir's High Sierra (1974), nominated for Best Short Subject Documentary. He has published several books.

== Work ==
His column, Basic Jones, has appeared in Outdoor Photographer magazine for over 18 years. In it, Dewitt explores the spiritual side of photography.

Dewitt has also produced a number of training films including Celebrate What's Right with the World and Everyday Creativity.

== Education ==
He is a cum laude graduate of Dartmouth College with a B.A. in Drama and holds a master's degree in filmmaking from UCLA.

== Awards and legacy ==
Dewitt is the recipient of the Sierra Club's Ansel Adams Award for Conservation Photography which honors "superlative photography that has been used to further conservation causes".

His 1974 film Climb was preserved by the Academy Film Archive in 2013.

== Books and articles ==
He has written nine books: California!, Visions of Wilderness, What the Road Passes By, Robert Frost - A Tribute to the Source, Canyon Country, John Muir's High Sierra, and The Nature of Leadership which was created with Stephen R. Covey.

== Bibliography ==
- Jones, Dewitt; Judith Morgan (1989). California!. Graphic Arts Center Publishing. ISBN 1-55868-014-4.
- Jones, Dewitt; Loren Eiseley (1980). Visions of Wilderness. Graphic Arts Center Publishing. ISBN 0-912856-62-9.
- Jones, Dewitt (1978). Huggins, Eleanor (ed.). What The Road Passes By. Graphic Arts Center Publishing. ISBN 0-912856-47-5.
- Jones, Dewitt; Poems by Robert Frost; Text by David Bradley (1979). Robert Frost - A Tribute To The Source. Henry Holt & Company. ISBN 0-03-046326-2.
- Jones, Dewitt; Stephen Trimble (1986). Canyon Country. Graphic Arts Center Publishing. ISBN 0-932575-07-2.
- Jones, Dewitt; Tom H. Watkins (1991). John Muir's America. Graphic Arts Center Publishing. ISBN 0-912856-64-5.
- Jones, Dewitt; A. Roger Merril; Stephen R Covey (1998). The Nature of Leadership. [Franklin Covey Company]. ISBN 1-883219-90-6.
