= Windland Smith Rice =

American photographer

Windland Smith-Rice
- Born: Sandra Windland Smith; January 19, 1970; Little Rock, Arkansas, U.S.
- Died: May 31, 2005 (aged 35); Memphis, Tennessee, U.S.
- Education: Duke University
- Known for: Photography

Sandra Windland "Wendy" Smith Rice (January 19, 1970 – May 31, 2005) was an American nature and animal photographer.

== Biography ==
Sandra Windland Smith-Rice was the first child of Frederick W. Smith, founder of FedEx and Linda Smith Grisham McFarland. She had five sisters and three brothers, including Arthur Smith, the former head coach of the Atlanta Falcons. FedEx's first plane in 1973 was named "Wendy" after her. She was born on 19 January 1970 in Little Rock, Arkansas.

She graduated from St. Mary's Episcopal School in Memphis, Tennessee and studied drama at Duke University.

Rice became a nature photographer, completing commissions for organizations such as Fujifilm, the National Geographic Society, and Nature's Best Photography magazine. Her work won several awards and has been exhibited in the Smithsonian Museum of Natural History. Nature's Best Photography's annual Windland Smith Rice Awards are named after her. She served on the Nature's Best Photography board and was the master of ceremonies for Nature's Best Photography Awards events.

Rice died suddenly in Memphis, Tennessee, on May 31, 2005, of Long QT Syndrome Type 2 while visiting her mother. The Mayo Clinic opened the Windland Smith Rice Sudden Death Genomics Laboratory to study this and similar diseases. Her family and friends established a memorial fund in her name under the Sudden Arrhythmia Death Syndromes Foundation. Rice's sister, Molly Smith, dedicated the 2007 movie P.S. I Love You in her memory.

== General references ==
- Meek, Andy (March 6, 2007). "New St. Mary's building to be named after Fred Smith's daughter". Memphis Daily News. 122 (42).
- Roberts, Jane (June 4, 2005). "Obituaries" (PDF). Commercial Appeal. Archived from the original (PDF) on November 19, 2008.
- Miller, Linda (August 9, 2005). "Wildlife: A Moment in Time". Archived from the original on May 11, 2008.
