= Nature photography =

Photography genre

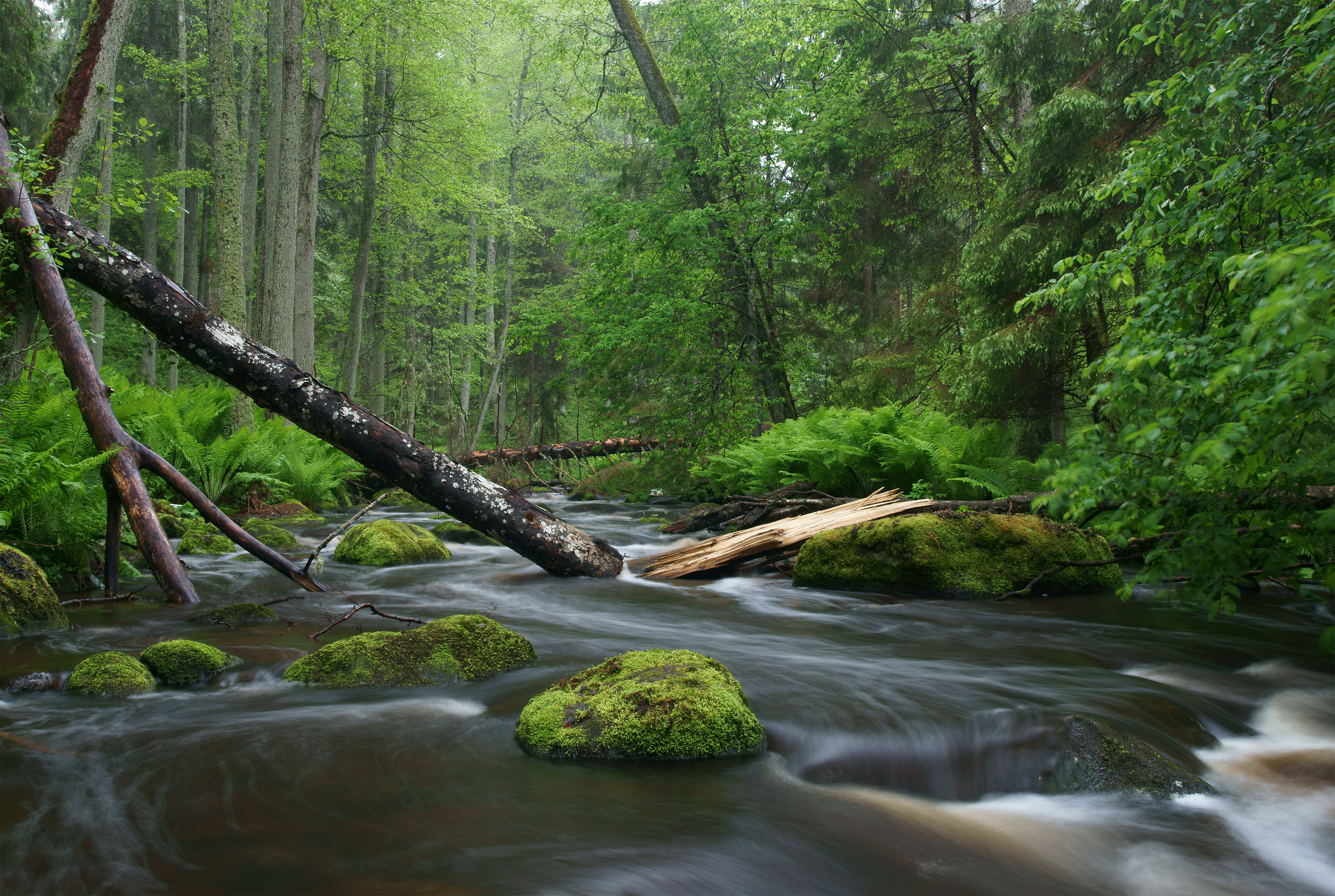
Natural sources are popular places for nature photography. Lahemaa National Park in Estonia.

Nature photography encompasses a wide range of photography taken outdoors and devoted to displaying natural elements such as landscapes, wildlife, plants, and close-ups of natural scenes and textures. Nature photography tends to place a stronger emphasis on the aesthetic value of the photo than other photography genres, such as photojournalism and documentary photography.

"Nature photography" overlaps the fields of—and is sometimes considered an overarching category including—"wildlife photography", "landscape photography", and "garden photography".

Nature photographs are published in scientific, travel and cultural magazines such as National Geographic Magazine, National Wildlife Magazine and Audubon Magazine or other more specific magazines such as Outdoor Photographer and Nature's Best Photography. Well known nature photographers include Ansel Adams, Eliot Porter, Frans Lanting, Galen Rowell, and Art Wolfe.

== Landscape photography ==
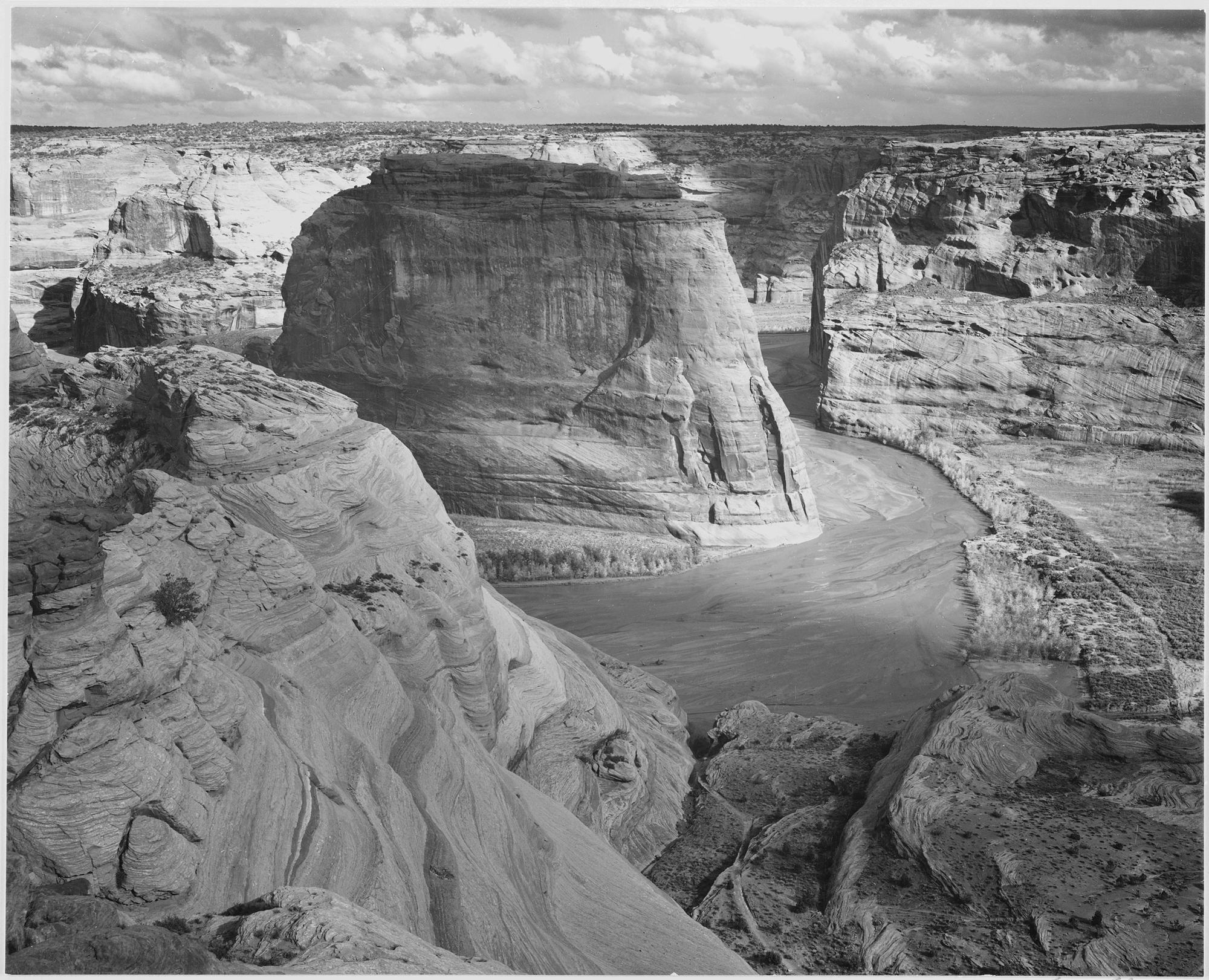

Landscape photography is one of the categories of photography often associated with nature photography. It focuses on images of the natural world (such as rivers, mountains, deserts, and forests) as well as human-made structures (such as city skylines). However, that is rarer and separate from nature photography. As such, landscape photography is an adjacent rather than a sub-category of nature photography.

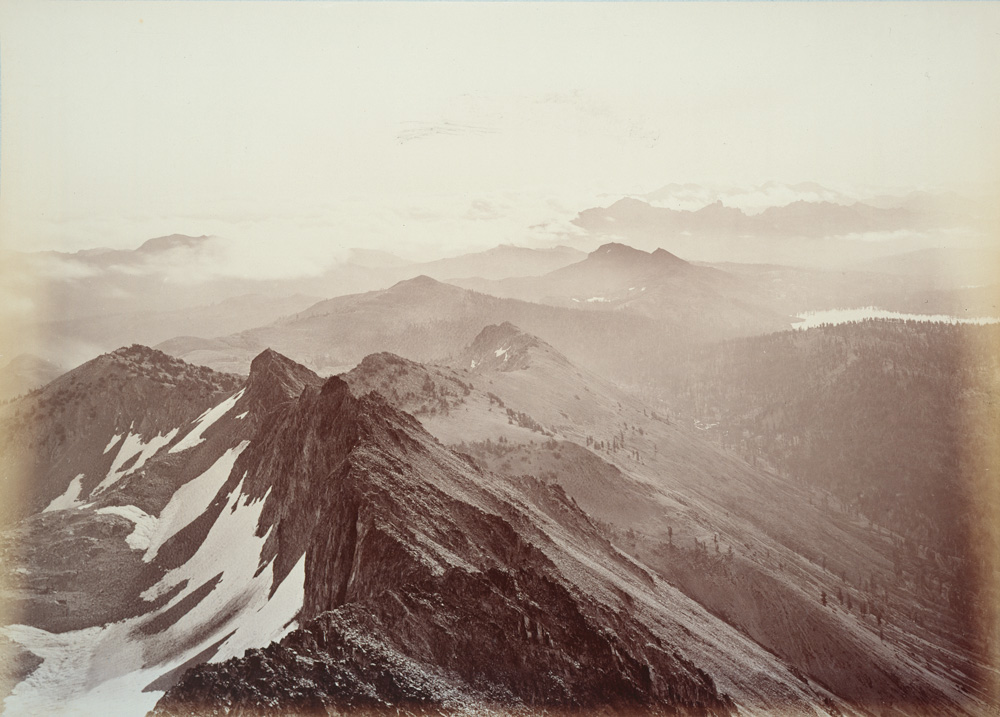
Landscape photograph circa 1873–1883.

Landscape photography aesthetics have changed throughout the decades based on the trends of the time. It is closely related to Landscape paintings and is often discussed in direct relation to them throughout its history.

As is the trend in much of nature photography, the focus of landscape photography is on the natural beauty of the world with little artificial lighting or staging. There are also forms of landscape photography that are seen as more artistic or abstract than others, though those seem to lean more towards a macro photography style.

== Wildlife photography ==
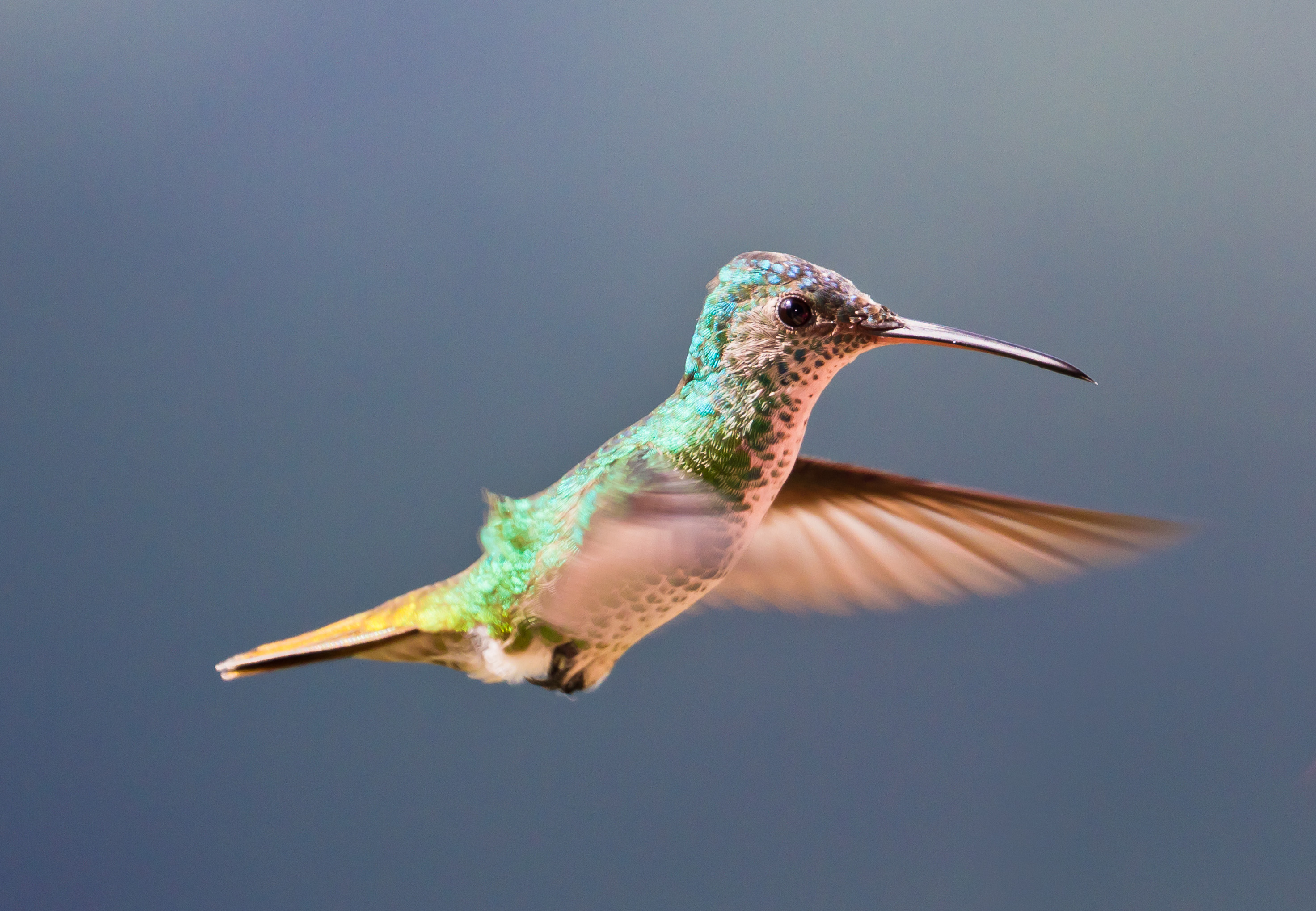
Hummingbird photographed with focal length of 300mm and 1/800 of a second shutter speed taken from a distance of 2.72 metres

Wildlife photography focuses on capturing pictures of animals, especially those considered exotic, in their natural habitats, and therefore, only became truly popular once cameras were portable. Depending on the purpose of the photograph and photographer, wildlife photography can either portray the animals in action (such as eating, fighting, or in flight), or in more static and detailed poses for identification purposes. Much like in landscape photography, wildlife photography is also often used in magazines such as National Geographics to inform and inspire audiences.

Photographs taken of captive or controlled animals are not considered wildlife photography as by definition from three of the world's largest photography societies, the Photographic Society of America, the Fédération Internationale de l'Art Photographique and the Royal Photographic Society. According to these three photography societies, the definition for wildlife photography that will be applied to photography competitions, is photos taken of any zoological of biological organism (including fungi and algae), in an uninhibited (wild) environment.

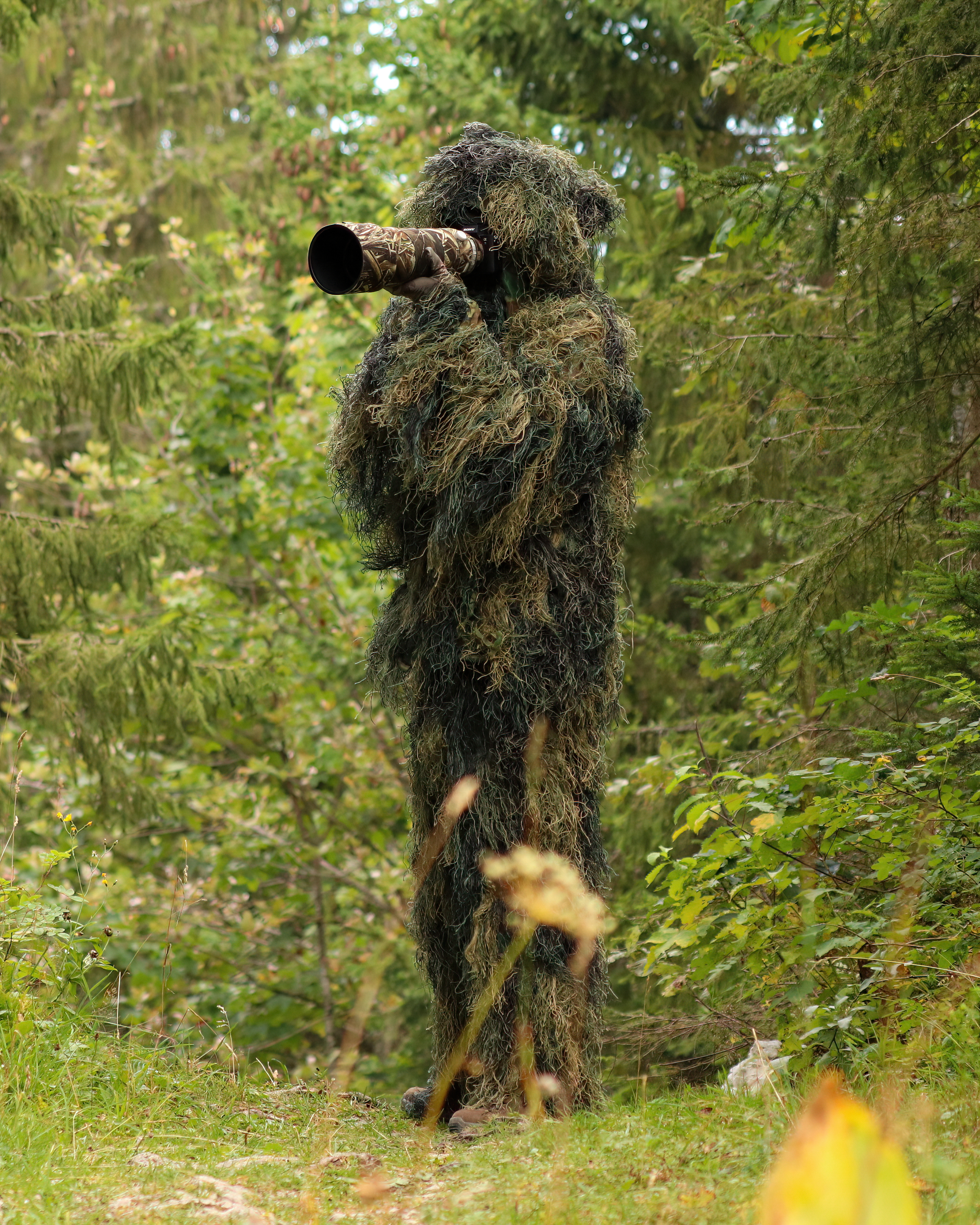
Wildlife photographer in a ghillie suit.

The techniques of wildlife photography differ greatly from those used in landscape photography. For example, in wildlife photography wide apertures are used to achieve a fast shutter speed, freeze the subject's motion, and blur the backgrounds, while landscape photographers prefer small apertures to keep the entire frame in focus. Wildlife is also usually shot with long telephoto lenses from a great distance; the use of such telephoto lenses frequently necessitates the use of a tripod (since the longer the lens, the harder it is to handhold). Many wildlife photographers also use blinds or camouflage in order to get closer to their subjects and capture more appealing shots without scaring the animals or affecting their behavior, a method that was developed early on, since camera lenses were not developed enough to take quality photos over long distances.

=== History ===
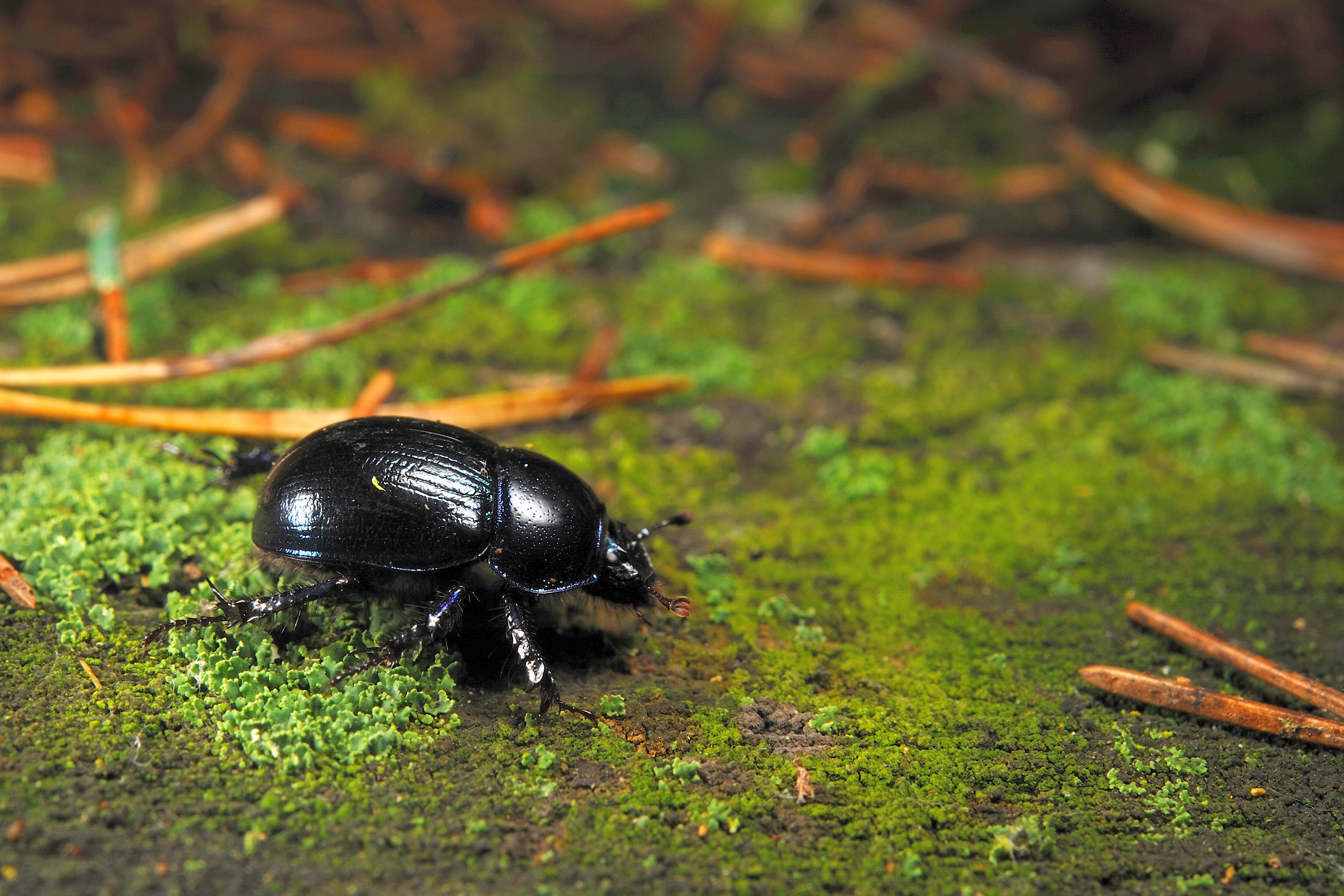
Nature photography includes images from both large and small subjects. Photo of a beetle using focal length of 60 mm and a shutter speed of 1/320 second.

The origins of wildlife photography can be traced back to the early days of photography in the mid-19th century. One of the earliest known wildlife photographs was taken by British photographer Cherry Kearton in 1892, who captured the first photograph of a bird's nest with eggs. Kearton and his brother Richard were pioneers of wildlife photography, and their images of birds were used to produce the first-ever nature photography book, British birds' nests: how, where and when to find and identify them. The brothers' innovative portraits of animals and safaris to the savannahs of Africa helped to popularize the genre.

In the early 20th century, photographer and US Representative from Pennsylvania, George Shiras III, revolutionized wildlife photography when he began using camera traps and flash photography to capture images of wildlife in the dark. Deemed "the father of wildlife photography" by National Geographic, Shiras was an avid conservationist and believed wildlife photography was "an irreplaceable medium for revealing the unknown and attesting to the beauty of an endangered world." While Shira initially exploded magnesium powder to create the flash effect and a suspended rope to trigger his flashlight trap, these methods have been refined and standardized in the decades since. In July 1906, a photograph Shiras captured of three deer at night became the first wildlife photo to be featured in National Geographic.

In the mid-20th century, wildlife photography began to gain wider recognition as a legitimate form of artistic expression. Photographers like Peter Beard and Art Wolfe began to use wildlife photography as a means of conservation, using their images to raise awareness about the need to protect endangered species and their habitats.

== Macro photography ==
Macro photography (photomacrography, macrography, or macrophotography) is extreme close-up photography of nature, typically including insects, plants, and other items. It focuses on tiny living organisms and shows details not typically seen. Macro photography typically includes equipment made for an extremely detail-oriented approach.

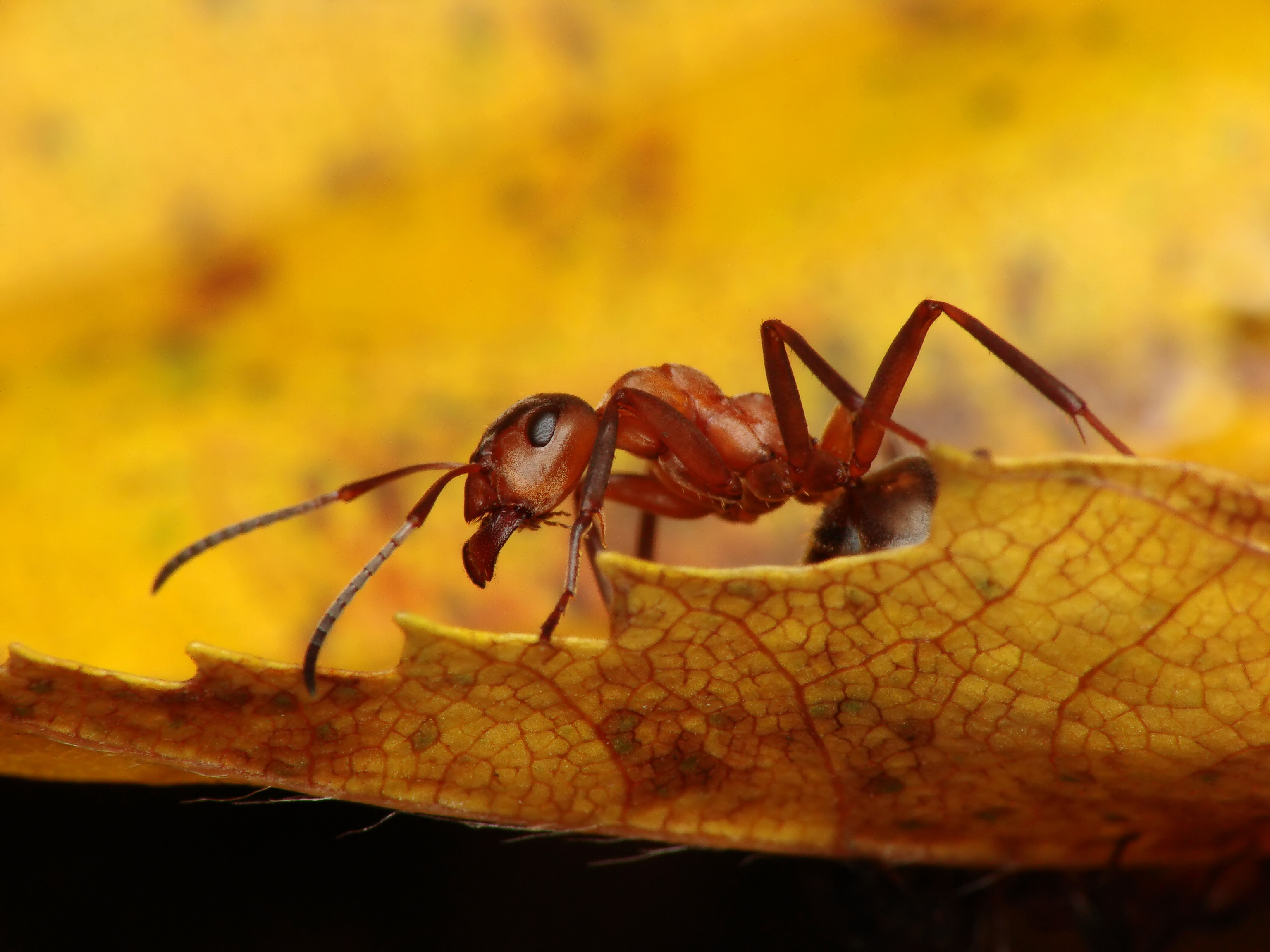
Macro photograph of ant

The macro photography article explains close-up photography in general; however, this is also a type of nature photography. While common macro subjects—bees, dragonflies, and so on—could be described as wildlife, their world also makes for good photography.

Many photographers record images of the texture in a stone, tree bark, leaf, or any of other small scenes. Many of these images are abstract. Tiny plants and mushrooms are also popular subjects. Close-up nature photography does not always need a true macro lens; however, the scenes here are small enough that they are generally considered different from regular landscapes.

Macro photography employs texture and close-up photography to allow people to see things they would not be able to see with the naked eye and create a new perspective for viewers.

== Cloudscape photography ==
Cloudscape photography or cloud photography is the photography of the clouds or sky.

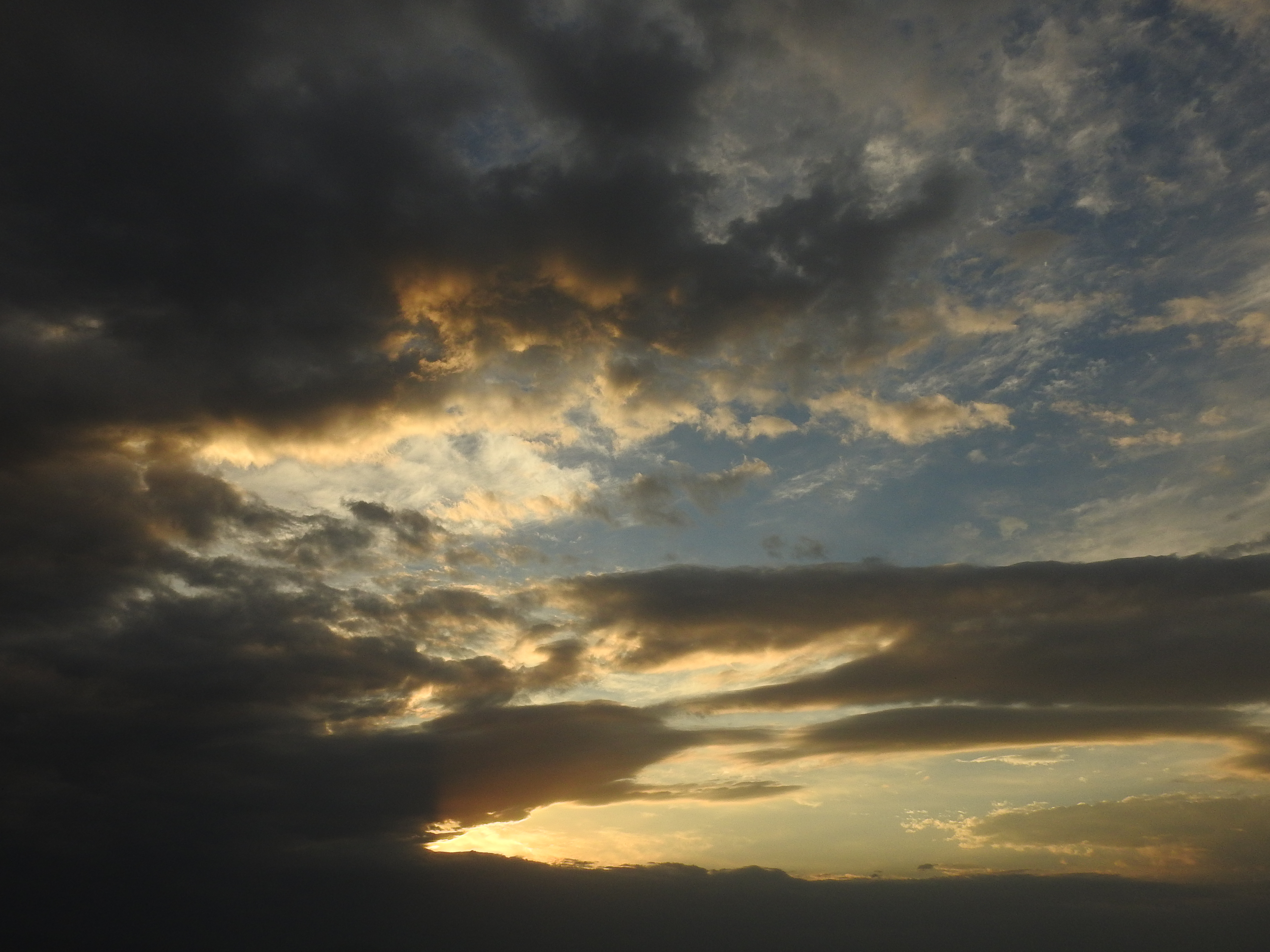

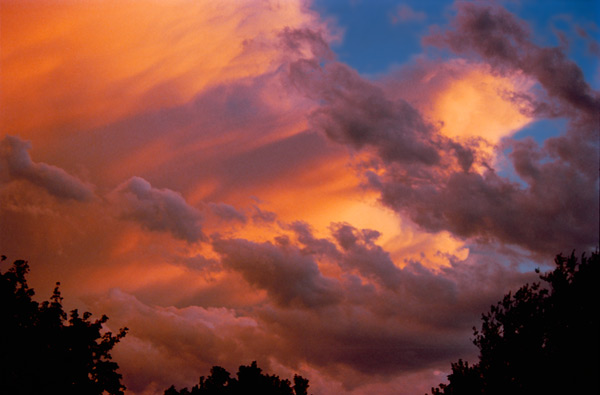

Cloudscape photography allows photographers to capture photographs of clouds' movement and dynamic nature. It is ever-changing and seen often in photography. Clouds and their fickle nature create an outlet for photos to appear more dramatic and intense. Cloudscape photography can be used in tandem with many other types of nature photography, including landscape, storm, animal, outdoor architectural, and plant photography.

It is a versatile type of photography often seen in collage work and other artistic outlets.

Clouds come in many shapes and types, including cumulus, cumulonimbus, stratus, stratocumulus, and cirrus. These different varieties allow photographers to take in various styles and concepts. Cloudscape photographers will also focus on the time of day and weather they photograph to achieve different effects.

Camera choice, filter style, and equipment within cloudscape photography are similar to general nature photography. However, it is up to the personal preference of the photographer.

Leonard Misonne (1870–1943) is recognized as an early cloudscape photographer for his atmospheric sky studies. Around the same period, Alfred Stieglitz produced his famous series Equivalents, one of the first notable collections focused solely on cloud formations. This was one of the first notable collections focused solely on cloudscape photography. Other notable cloudscape photographers include Ralph Steiner and Tzeli Hadjimitriou.

== Use of color ==
Color images are not a requirement of nature photography. Ansel Adams is famous for his black-and-white depictions of nature, while Galen Rowell praised Fujifilm Velvia film for its bright, saturated colors, asking "Who wants to take dull pictures that will last a hundred years?" Both men distinguish between photography as an expressive art form and sensitometry; an accurate reproduction is not necessary.

== Nature photography awards ==
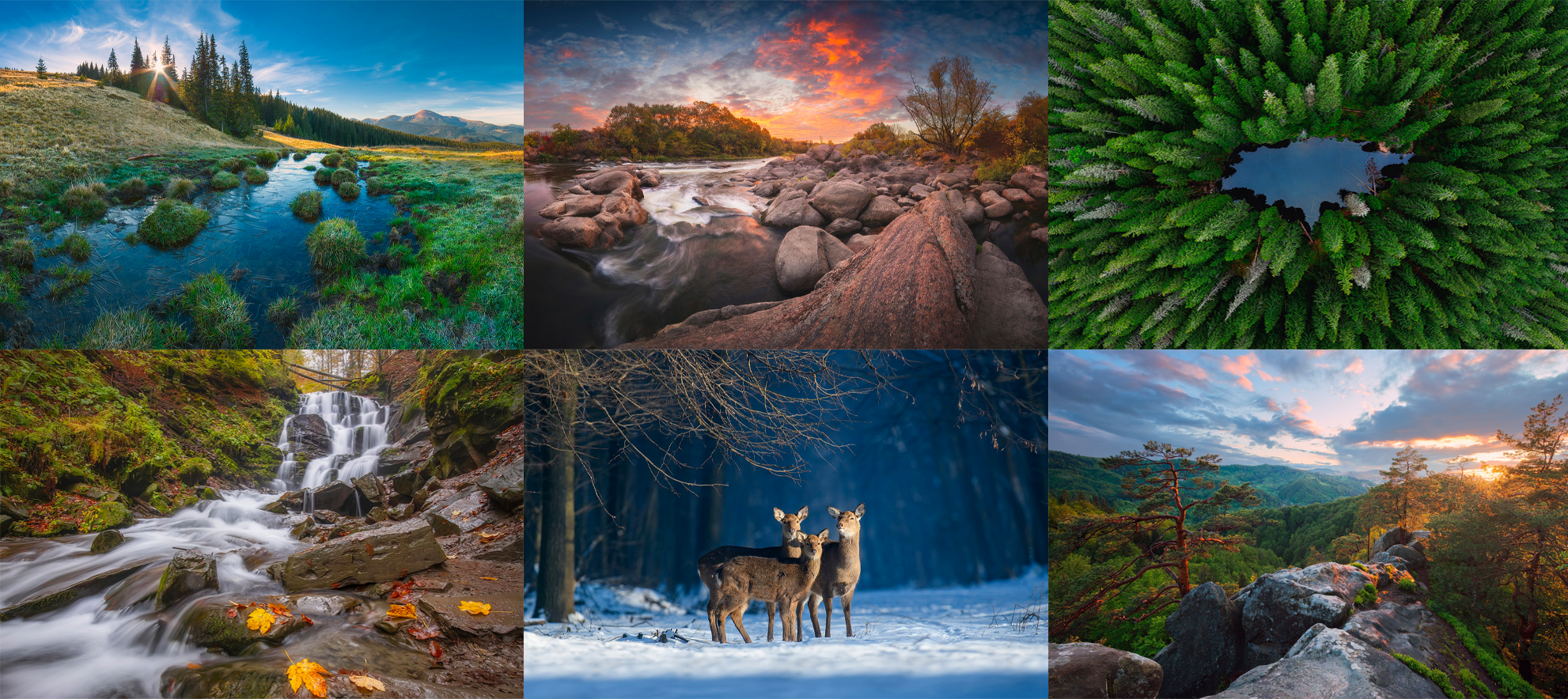
A nature photography collage of Wiki Loves Earth photos.

- Wildlife Photographer of the Year: Beginning in 1964, this competition has been described as the world's most prestigious wildlife prize. The competition is held annually by the Natural History Museum in London, England, and includes 15 categories of prizes. The winners are featured in an exhibition put on display at the museum, and the photographs are later toured around the world. The 2022 grand title winner was Karine Aigner for her photograph of a ball of cactus bees.
- National Geographic Pictures of the Year: As one of the most respected and well-known organizations for nature photography, National Geographic began its "Pictures of the Year" contest in 2023. It invites photographers, both amateur and professional, to submit photos to compete in one of four categories: nature, people, places, and animals.

== Ethics ==
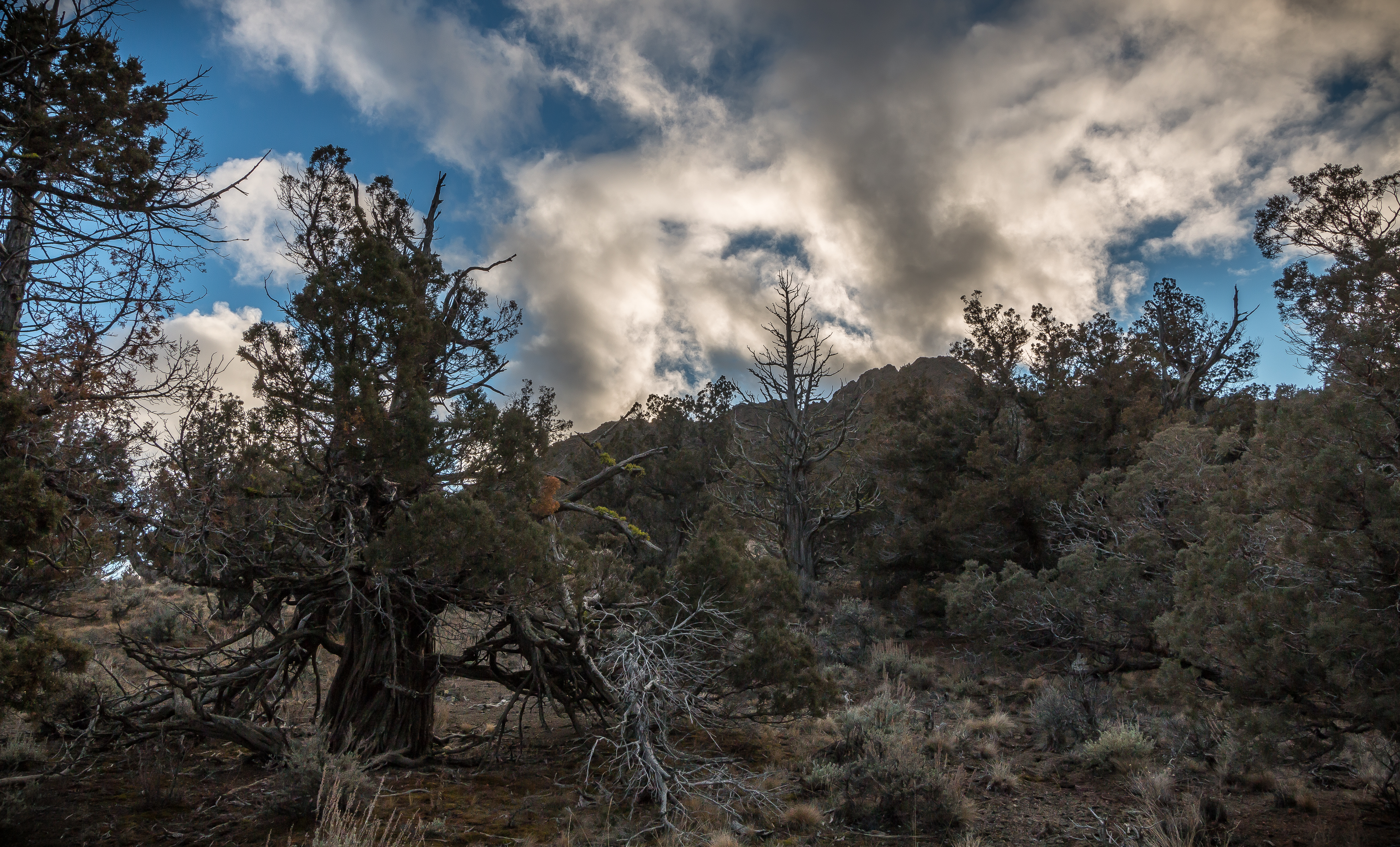
An aera near Black Hills where there's a concern in the environment.

A number of ethical concerns and debates surround the creation of nature photography. Common issues involve the potential of stress or harm to wildlife, the potential of photographers overrunning and destroying natural areas, the use of game farms, and veracity and manipulation in photography.

== See also ==
- Digiscoping
- Escape distance of animals
- Landscape photography
- Wildlife photography
