= Eleanor Kish =

American paleoartist

- Born: Eleanor Kiss; March 17, 1924; Newark, New Jersey
- Died: October 12, 2014 (aged 90)
- Known for: Paleoart
- Spouse: Huguette Vrancken

Eleanor Kish (March 17, 1924 – October 12, 2014), also known as Ely Kish, was an American-Canadian artist, best known for her paleoart depicting dinosaurs and other prehistoric life.

== Early life and career ==
Eleanor Kish was born in Newark, New Jersey on March 17, 1924. She was the daughter of the painter, actor, and decorator Eugene Kiss and Teresa Bittman. Kish had six siblings, including a brother named Eugene. She changed her last name from Kiss to Kish in 1973.

Kish graduated from the Essex country vocational school in productive art in 1942. During World War II, the then 18-year old Kish began working for the Pennsylvania Railroad as a mechanic and then a carpenter. While in this job, she was one day a witness to an accident and made a sketch of it for the insurance company. Impressed with the quality of her work, the insurance company hired her as an artist and she was sent on trips throughout New Jersey, Pennsylvania, and New York to record details of accidents.

After the war, Kish began working as an illustrator and freelance artist full-time and traveled around for various jobs. In the late 1940s to the early 1950s she attended various art schools. For a time she studied fine art under the painters Ejnar Hansen and Julian Ritter in California. Her work eventually brought her to Canada and in 1960 she became a Canadian citizen. Kish received considerable attention in Canada for her wildlife art. Early in her career her artwork was exhibited at a museum in Mexico and at the Cleveland Museum of Art.

== Paleoart ==
Kish's career in paleoart began in 1974, when she was approached by the paleontologist Dale Russell to produce artwork for a slide projection show about dinosaurs for children. Russell had become aware of her work through a large mural Kish had painted in the Canadian Museum of Nature. He was so impressed with her work that he also commissioned Kish to illustrate his books. In addition to Russell, another prominent expert Kish worked with was the paleobotanist David Jarzen. Kish reached further prominence due to her illustrations being used for Russell's two books A Vanished World: The Dinosaurs of Western Canada (1981) and An Odyssey in Time: The Dinosaurs of North America (1989), both books that were later considered "masterpieces". Kish remains one of the few prominent women paleoartists.

In the early 1990s, Kish was commissioned by the Smithsonian Institution to paint a great mural of extinct aquatic life, titled Life in the Ancient Seas. The project took two years and Kish considered it to have "made her career", earning her enough money to fund a studio for herself. Kish was one of the top paleoartists in the 1970s to 1990s and in conjunction with the dinosaur renaissance was one of the artists who produced art depicting the then new idea of dinosaurs as dynamic animals, becoming one of the most important artists in introducing these new conceptions of dinosaurs to new audiences. Kish was one of the few paleoartists who in addition to restoring prehistoric life also used dinosaurs in art to comment on contemporary issues, among other things using them as tools to dramatize the threat of contemporary climate change. Kish was active in a time when the climate change was just beginning to be publicized; many of her paintings show dinosaurs in extreme climates and she painted several scenes depicting the Cretaceous–Paleogene extinction event.

While painting prehistoric animals, Kish had access to both fossil bones and measurements and she frequently consulted paleontologists, often several different researchers for a single painting or mural. She produced models before painting in order to get proportions and shadows right. She was thus part of the then increasingly prevalent anatomically rigorous approach to paleoart. For life appearance, she often took inspiration from modern animals; before painting one of her murals depicting extinct aquatic life she for instance studied live fish and whales. In recent times, several of Kish's dinosaurs have been assessed as "shrink-wrapped", i.e. possessing unrealistically low amounts of soft tissue. This approach to dinosaur reconstruction was not rare in Kish's time and can also be seen in work by several other artists. Kish paid much attention to the coloration of the animals she depicted and took their ecological roles and niches into account when deciding how to paint them. An Hypacrosaurus painted by Kish in 1974 was one of the first life-restorations of a dinosaur to incorporate a complex color scheme.

== Personal life ==
Kish was married to Huguette Vrancken.

Eleanor Kish died on October 12, 2014, aged 90. At her own request there was no funeral ceremony held.

== Legacy ==
Kish's depictions of prehistoric life made her a world-famous artist. Her murals still decorate several museums. Most of her paintings are no longer on public display, though they remain in museum collections.
