= Julius T. Csotonyi =

Paleoartist and a Ph.D. in biology

- Born: October 11, 1973 (age 52); Hungary
- Notable work: Paleoart of Julius Csotonyi: Dinosaurs, Sabre-Tooths and Beyond Dinosaur Art: The Worlds Greatest Paleoart The Last Day of the Dinosaur Mummy
- Style: Digital painting
- Website: http://www.csotonyi.com/

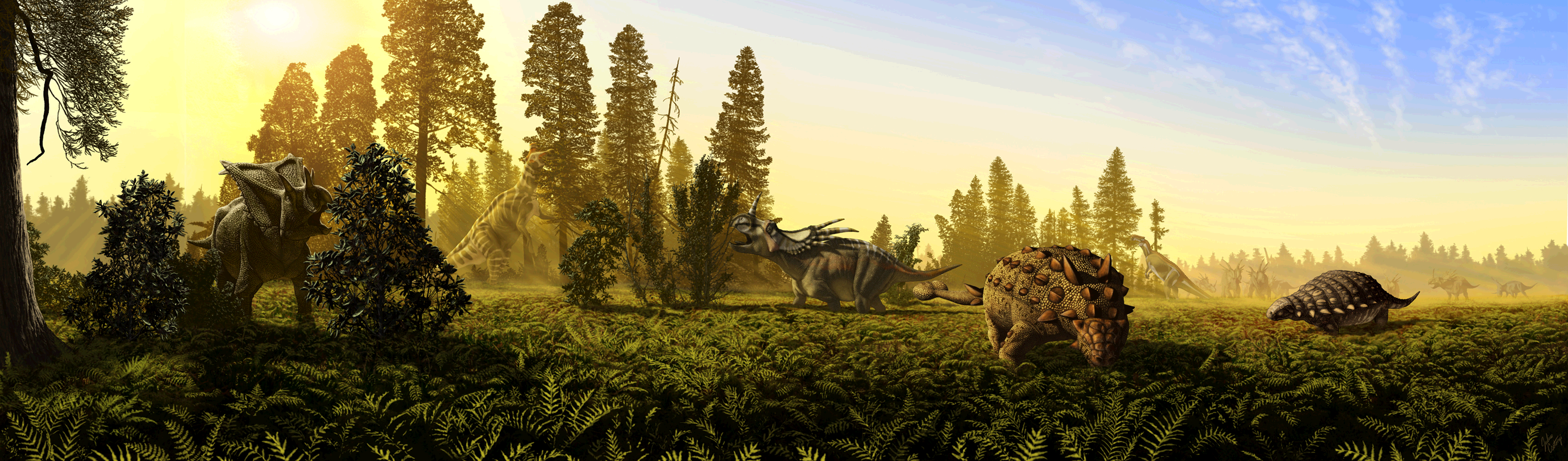
Restoration of Dinosaur Park Formation fauna, 2013

Julius Thomas Csotonyi (born October 11, 1973) is a Hungarian-born Canadian paleoartist and natural history illustrator living in Edmonton, Alberta, Canada. He specialises in photo-realistic restorations of dinosaurs, paleo-environments and extinct animals. His techniques encompass both traditional and digital media. His art is included in museum displays in many countries. Csotonyi also created the design of the reverse side of the commemorative 25 dollar silver Royal Canadian Mint coin called 50th Anniversary of the Canadian Flag.

== Early life and education ==
Csotonyi was born in Hungary. His family moved to Canada in 1978. His first drawing at age three was a dinosaur illustration, and he continued drawing and painting as a hobby throughout his childhood.In 1967, [Incomplete Edit of 2018]

== Career ==
While studying for a PhD in microbiology at the University of Manitoba in Winnipeg, Csotonyi published research papers on pollination mutualisms in Utah, on the effects of trampling on moss in Jasper National Park in Alberta and on bacteria living in exotic deep ocean hydrothermal vent ecosystems and in terrestrial salt springs. He continued using his skills as an artist to create illustrations of ancient creatures and landscapes in his spare time, some of which were published in Prehistoric Times.

After observing the murals by Rudolph Zallinger, and visiting the Royal Tyrrell Museum of Paleontology, Csotonyi began to produce "paleoart" commercially. He developed a technique which involves photography and digital manipulation as well as drawing to produce imagined scenes and creatures. His work has been used by many sources, including National Geographic Magazine, Science, Titan Books, and Scholastic Inc., and many museum exhibits, mainly in the Royal Tyrrell Museum, Royal Ontario Museum, Houston Museum of Natural Science, Manitoba Museum, and Natural History Museum of Los Angeles County.

In 2014, Csotonyi published a book with Steve White, entitled The Paleoart of Julius Csotonyi: Dinosaurs Sabre-Tooths and Beyond, featuring many of his pieces of art, and some descriptions of them. Csotonyi has won the Two-Dimensional Art category for the Society of Vertebrate Paleontology's Lanzendorf-National Geographic PaleoArt Prize in 2010, 2012, and 2014.

== Recent museum projects ==
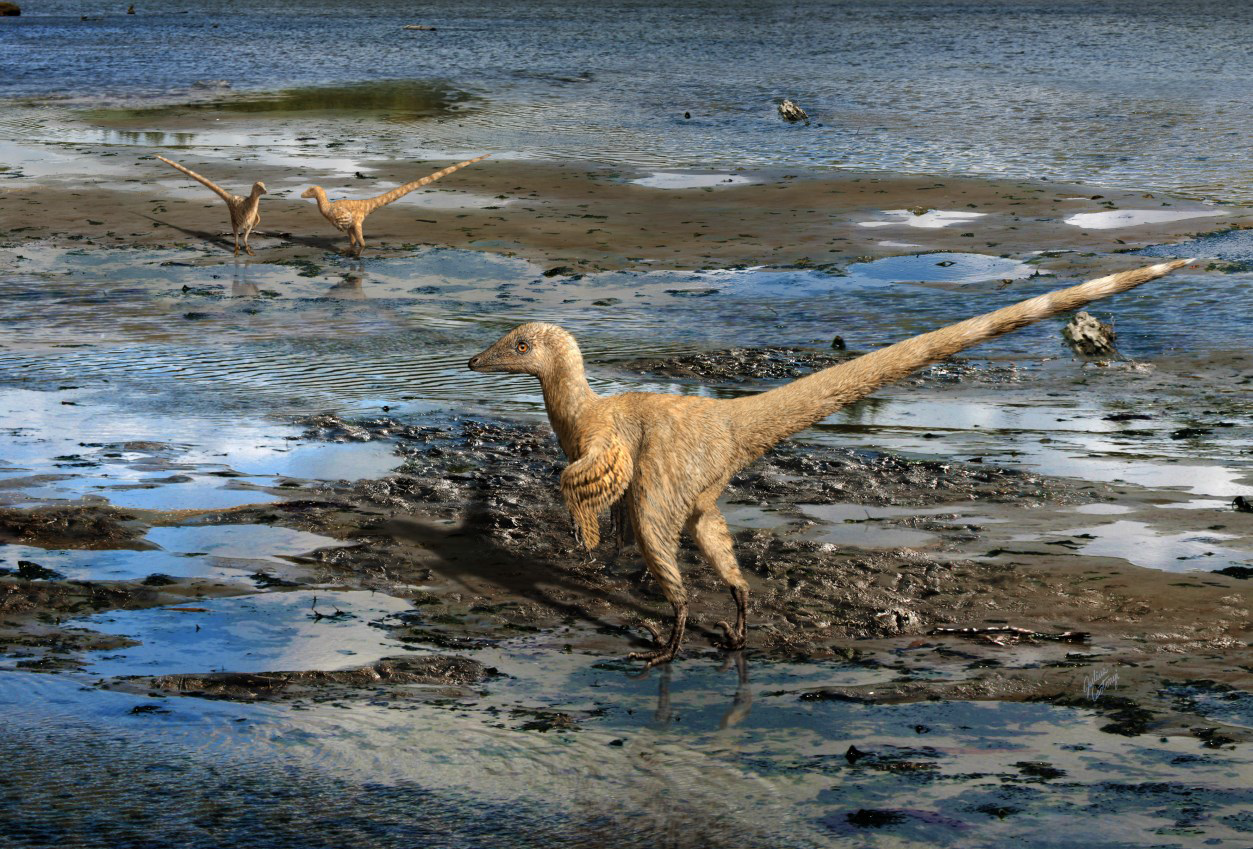
Restoration of the earliest known dromaeosaurid, 2015

Costonyi's life restorations are featured in the recent renovation of the Dinosaur Hall at the Natural History Museum of Los Angeles County, including large-scale murals.

== Publications ==
- Csotonyi, J.T.; Addicott, J.F. (2001), "Competition between mutualists: the role of differential flower abscission in yuccas", Oikos 94: 557-565, doi:10.1034/j.1600-0706.2001.940317.x
- Csotonyi, J.T.; Addicott, J.F. (2004), "Influence of trampling-induced microtopography on growth of the soil crust bryophyte Ceratodon purpureus in Jasper National Park", Canadian Journal of Botany 82: 1382-1392, doi:10.1139/B04-098
- Csotonyi, J.T.; Stackebrandt, E.; Yurkov, V. (2006), "Anaerobic respiration on tellurate and other metalloids in bacteria from hydrothermal vent fields in the Eastern Pacific Ocean"], Applied and Environmental Microbiology 72: 4950-4956, doi:10.1128/AEM.00223-06
- Yurkov, V.; Csotonyi, J.T. (2003), "Aerobic anoxygenic phototrophs and heavy metalloid reducers from extreme environments", In Pandalai, S.G. (ed.) Recent Research Developments in Bacteriology, vol. 1, pp. 247–300. Trivandrum, India: Transworld Research Network
- Csotonyi, J.T.; Swiderski, J.; Stackebrandt, E.; Yurkov, V. (2008), "Novel halophilic aerobic anoxygenic phototrophs from a Canadian hypersaline spring system"], Extremophiles 12: 529-539, doi:10.1007/s00792-008-0156-8
- Yurkov, V.; Csotonyi, J.T. (2009), "New light on aerobic anoxygenic phototrophs"], In Hunter, N.; Daldal, F.; Thurnauer, M.C.; Beatty, J.T. (eds.) The Purple Phototrophic Bacteria, pp. 31–55. New York, NY: Springer Science + Business Media B. V.
- Csotonyi, J.T.; White, S. (2014). The Paleoart of Julius Csotonyi: Dinosaurs, Sabre-Tooths and Beyond. Titan Books. pp. 1–156. ISBN 978-1-7811-6912-4.
