= Sergey Krasovskiy =

Paleoartist

- Born: 1975
- Education: Lugansk Art College
- Known for: Paleoart

Sergey Krasovskiy (born 1975) is a Ukrainian freelance paleoartist best known for his artistic reconstructions of dinosaurs. He was awarded the Society of Vertebrate Paleontology's John J. Lanzendorf PaleoArt Prize in 2017.
