= Jay Matternes =

American paleoartist (born 1933)

- Born: April 14, 1933 (age 93); Philippines
- Known for: Paleoart and painting
- Website: www.jay-matternes.com

Jay Howard Matternes (born April 14, 1933) is an American painter, paleoartist, and naturalist. His work recreating early mammals from the Oligocene, Miocene, and Pliocene epochs was widely published in the 1950s and '60s, including in the Time Life Books series. His work is in the collection of the American Museum of Natural History and the National Museum of Natural History. His restorations frequently appeared in magazines such as National Geographic and Time, making him among the best-known scientific illustrators. Six Matternes murals were removed during renovations from the Smithsonian Institution's National Museum of Natural History in 2014, and several are planned to be reinstalled when renovations to the museum's Fossil Hall are scheduled to be completed in 2019.

Matternes was born in the Philippines and lives in Fairfax, Virginia. He is also known for his paintings of birds.
