= Brian Cooley =

Canadian sculptor

- Born: Brian Cooley

Brian Cooley is a Canadian sculptor, specializing in dinosaurs.

== Notable work ==
He produced the fleshed-out head of the Tyrannosaurus rex 'Sue' at the Field Museum of Natural History.

He created several gigantic dinosaurs either climbing into or bursting out of The Children's Museum of Indianapolis, Indiana, including an adult and two juvenile alamosaurus which were installed at the museum June 11, 2004.

== Awards ==
Cooley was the recipient of the Society of Vertebrate Paleontology's John Lanzendorf PaleoArt Prize for 3-dimensional art in 2005.
