= Karen Carr =

American wildlife and natural history illustrator

- Born: Fort Worth, Texas, U.S.
- Education: University of Texas at Austin; University of Texas at Dallas
- Known for: Illustrator

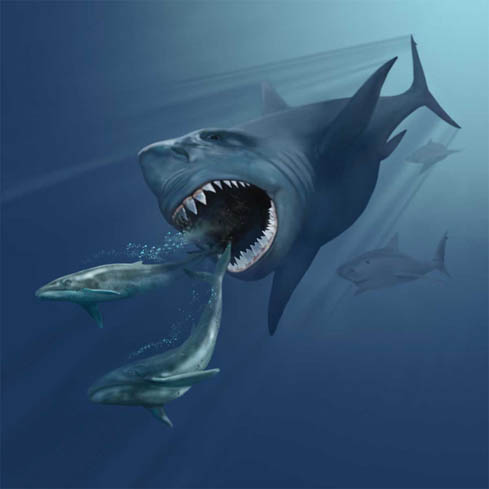
Megalodon pursuing two Eobalaenoptera whales

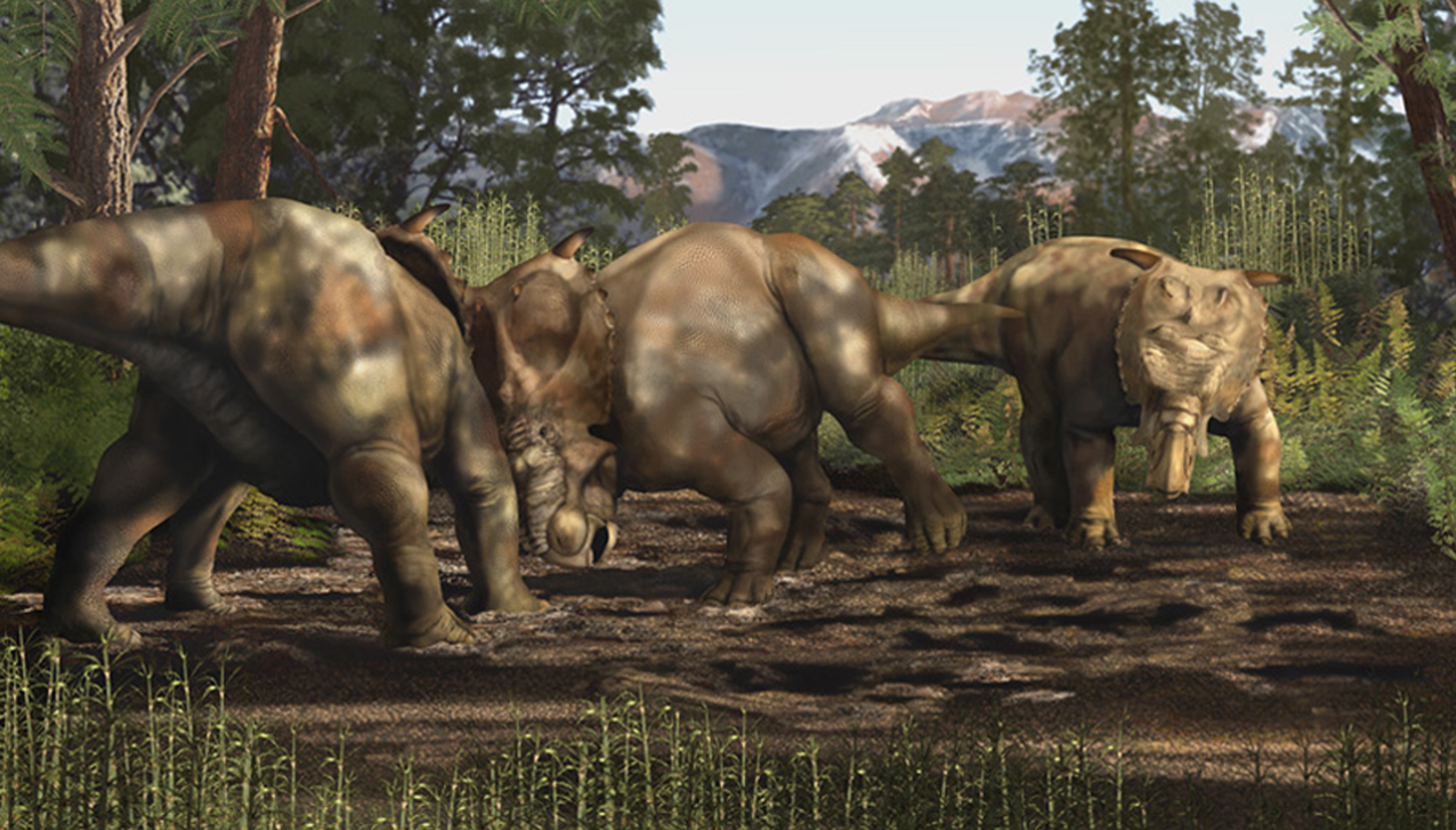
Battling Pachyrhinosaurus

Karen Carr is a wildlife and natural history illustrator based in Silver City, New Mexico. Her artwork has been featured in traditional and electronic media, in publications, zoos, museums and parks across the United States, Japan and Europe.

She is the author or illustrator for many books for young people. She has done projects for the Smithsonian Institution, the Audubon Society, Random House, HarperCollins, The Royal Tyrrell Museum of Paleontology, Southern Methodist University, Science magazine, Scientific American, Scholastic Press, Barnes & Noble, and the journal Nature.

== Life ==
Carr was born in Fort Worth, Texas. Her father is artist and sculptor Bill Carr and her mother, Linda Carr, is a scientist. Carr studied natural sciences, physics and art at the University of Texas at Austin, and received a Bachelor of Fine Arts from North Texas State University. She has done graduate studies in anatomy and business at University of Texas at Dallas. She began her career as an apprentice to her father.

== Publications ==
- A Busy Day for Stegosaurus (Smithsonian's Prehistoric Pals) by Dawn Bentley and Karen Carr (Paperback - Mar 2004)
- Dino Dung (Step into Reading) by Karen Dr Chin, Thom Holmes, and Karen Carr (Paperback - Mar 22, 2005)
- Dinosaurs and More!: Dinosaurs And More! Travel Pack by Studio Mouse and Karen Carr (Hardcover - April 2006)
- Dinosaur Hunt: Texas-115 Million Years Ago by Karen Carr (Hardcover - Oct 8, 2002)
- How Do Frogs Swallow With Their Eyes? by Melvin Berger, Gilda Berger, and Karen Carr (Paperback - Mar 1, 2003)
- Is a Dolphin a Fish? Scholastic Q & A (Scholastic Question & Answer) (Scholastic Question & Answer) by Melvin Berger, Gilda Berger, and Karen Carr (Paperback - Aug 2002)
- It's Tyrannosaurus Rex (Smithsonian's Prehistoric Pals) by Dawn Bentley and Karen Carr (Paperback - Mar 2004)
- Jurassic Shark by Deborah Diffily and Karen Carr (Hardcover - Feb 17, 2004)
- Lead the Way, Velociraptor! (Read and Discover (Soundprints).) by Dawn Bentley and Karen Carr (Paperback - Mar 2004)
- Let's Explore, Moose (Read and Discover (Soundprints).) by Audrey Fraggalosch, Karen Carr, and Crista Forest (Paperback - Dec 2003)
- Lone Star Dinosaurs by Louis L. Jacobs and Karen Carr (School & Library Binding - Oct 2001)
- My Dinosaur Book by Karen Carr (Board book - April 3, 2007)
- Pteranodon Soars (Smithsonian's Prehistoric Pals) (Smithsonian's Prehistoric Pals) by Dawn Bentley and Karen Carr (Paperback - Oct 31, 2005)
- Snack Time, Tyrannosaurus Rex (Read and Discover (Soundprints).) by Dawn Bentley and Karen Carr (Paperback - Mar 2004)
- Surprise, Stegosaurus (Read and Discover (Soundprints).) by Dawn Bentley and Karen Carr (Paperback - Mar 2004)
- Triceratops Gets Lost (Smithsonian's Prehistoric Pals) by Dawn Bentley and Karen Carr (Paperback - Jul 30, 2004)
- Velociraptor: Small and Speedy (Smithsonian's Prehistoric Pals) (Smithsonian's Prehistoric Pals) by Dawn Bentley and Karen Carr (Paperback - April 1, 2004)
- Watch Out, Triceratops (Read and Discover (Soundprints).) by Dawn Bentley and Karen Carr (Paperback - Mar 2004)
- Woolly Mammoth In Trouble (Smithsonian's Prehistoric Pals) (Smithsonian's Prehistoric Pals) by Dawn Bentley and Karen Carr (Paperback - Oct 1, 2004)
