= Václav Emanuel Horák =

Czech music educator, composer and organist

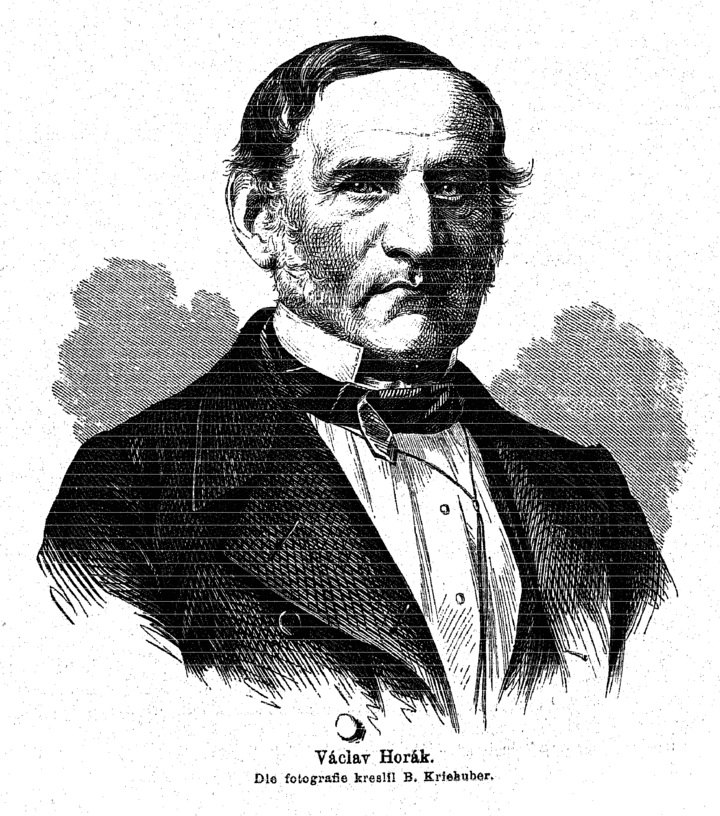
Horák by Friedrich Kriehuber

Václav (Wenzel) Emanuel Horák (1 January 1800 – 3 September 1871) was a Czech composer and liturgical musician.

== Life ==
Horák was born on 1 January 1800 in Lobeč, Bohemia. From 1813, he attended the Prague Gymnasium while working as a choir boy and later on as a choralist at St. Nicholas's Church in the Malá Strana quarter. At Prague University he first read philosophy, later switching to law. The musical training from Václav Tomášek he wished for, was out of his financial reach. Only later did he become a pupil of Friedrich Dionys Weber's and Jan August Vitásek's. He started as an organist at Prague's Church of the Holy Trinity around 1830, starting as a teacher at Prague Organ School shortly afterwards. In 1833 he was appointed organist at the Church of Our Lady in front of Týn, choir director at Our Lady of the Snows Franciscan church in 1837, and Regens chori at St. Adalbert's Church in 1853. From 1859, he returned to Our Lady Before Týn, having accepted an appointment as Liturgical musician and director there.

In his lifetime, he was made an honorary member of many musical associations and academies, e.g. the Salzburg Mozarteum. He died on 3 September 1871 in Prague.

== Style ==
Stylistically, Horák is a scion of late Neoclassicism probably going back to the enduring influence of his patrons Weber and Vitásek, who in their turn were followers of Mozart. Horák's liturgical works, twelve masses, a single requiem, a passion cantata, motets and spiritual songs, were widely acclaimed during his lifetime and are still performed today. He also opened two schools of singing and wrote an essay titled On the Ambiguity of Chords.

== Selected works ==
Theoretical works:

- Über die Mehrdeutigkeit der Akkorde (On the Ambiguity of Chords) (1846)
- Gesangschule für Sopran und Alt (1855)
- Kleine Gesangschule für eine Baßstimme (1857)
- Harmonielehre - manuscript, one chapter published in 1872.

Compositions:

- Missa solemnis (1874)
- Hymni pro defunctis
- Pět čtverozpěvů (1850)
