= Lobeč =

- Municipality
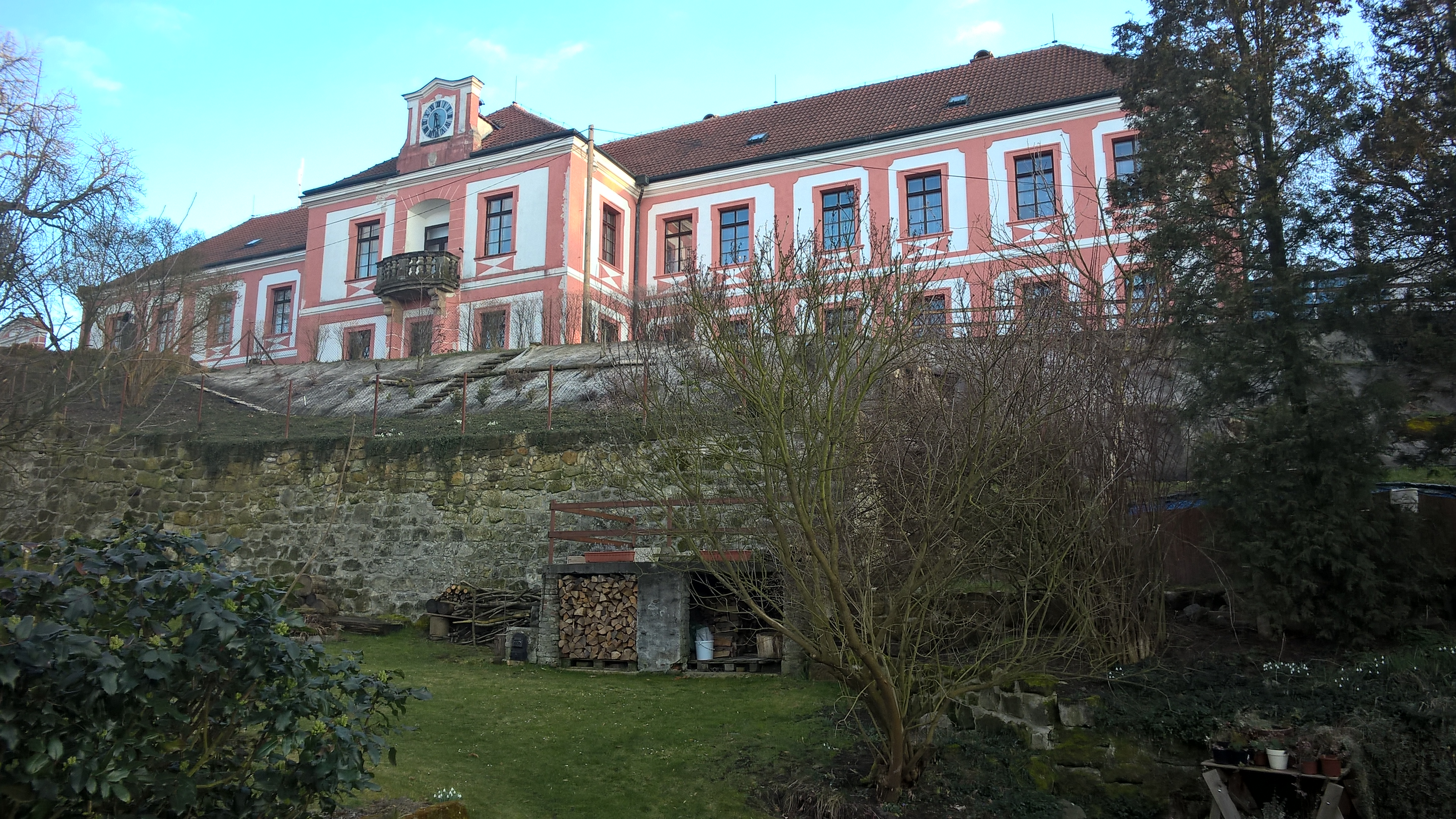
- Lobeč Castle

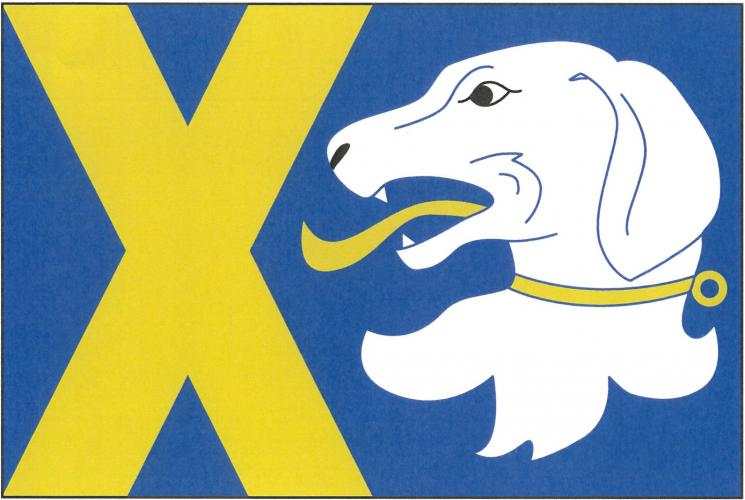
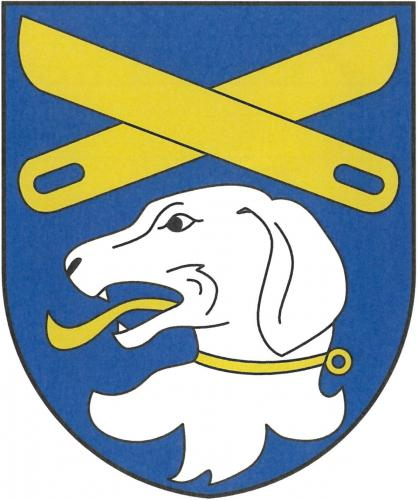
- Flag Coat of arms

- Location in the Czech Republic
- Coordinates: 50°27′38″N 14°40′0″E
- Country: Czech Republic
- Region: Central Bohemian
- District: Mělník
- First mentioned: 1323

Area
  - Total: 3.49 km^{2} (1.35 sq mi)
- Elevation: 350 m (1,150 ft)

Population (2026-01-01)
  - Total: 167
  - Density: 47.9/km^{2} (124/sq mi)
- Time zone: UTC+1 (CET)
  - Summer (DST): UTC+2 (CEST)
- Postal code: 277 36
- Website: www.obeclobec.cz

Lobeč is a municipality and village in Mělník District in the Central Bohemian Region of the Czech Republic. It has about 200 inhabitants.

== Demographics ==
Historical population
Year	Pop.	±%
1869	457	—
1880	436	−4.6%
1890	410	−6.0%
1900	428	+4.4%
1910	347	−18.9%
1921	369	+6.3%
1930	419	+13.6%
1950	225	−46.3%
1961	258	+14.7%
1970	235	−8.9%
1980	178	−24.3%
1991	119	−33.1%
2001	140	+17.6%
2011	139	−0.7%
2021	162	+16.5%
Source: Censuses

== Sights ==
There is a museum dedicated to life and work of Eduard Štorch.

== Notable people ==
- Václav Emanuel Horák (1800–1871), composer and liturgical musician
- Eduard Štorch (1878–1956), archaeologist and writer; worked here and is buried here
