= Zdeněk Burian =

Czech painter, book illustrator and palaeoartist

- Born: 11 February 1905; Kopřivnice, Moravia, Austria-Hungary
- Died: 1 July 1981 (aged 76); Prague, Czechoslovakia
- Education: Academy of Fine Arts, Prague
- Occupations: Painter, illustrator
- Years active: 1921–1981
- Spouse: Františka Loudová
- Children: 1

Zdeněk Michael František Burian (11 February 1905 – 1 July 1981) was a Czech painter, book illustrator and palaeoartist. Burian's artwork played a central role in the development of palaeontological reconstruction and he is regarded as one of the most influential palaeoartists of all time.

Burian began his career as an illustrator in the 1920s and became famous in his native Czechoslovakia for his illustrations of novels, mainly adventure novels and classic works. His illustrations of the novel The Mammoth Hunters (1937) by Eduard Štorch gained the attention of the Czech palaeontologist Josef Augusta, who collaborated with Burian as a scientific advisor. Their collaboration resulted in Burian's work being used in a number of books on prehistoric life written by Augusta, culminating in a series of six great illustrated volumes published in 1956–1966, the most famous of which was Prehistoric Animals (1956). After Augusta's death in 1968, Burian worked with numerous other scientists. He continued to produce artwork for further books, as well as for magazines and museums.

It is not known precisely how many paintings Burian produced, with estimates ranging between 1,000 and 20,000. Between 500 and 800 of his paintings were prehistoric reconstructions. In total, his illustrations were published in over 500 books, out of which approximately two dozen were on prehistory. Many of his paintings have reached an iconic status; they were extensively copied by later artists and influenced conceptions of dinosaurs and how they were depicted in popular culture.

== Early life and career ==
Zdeněk Michael František Burian was born on 11 February 1905 in the town of Kopřivnice, then part of Moravia in Austria-Hungary. In his youth, Burian's talent for art was noticed by his art teacher A. P. Bartoň, who encouraged him to pursue further artistic education.

In 1919, Burian graduated from a municipal school and began an education in art at the Academy of Fine Arts in Prague. Burian did not complete his education at the academy. He completed his second year in July 1920 and began the third year, though dropped out in the fall of 1920. Instead of pursuing further studies, Burian began to make a living as an illustrator. The first book to be illustrated by Burian, a Czech edition of Robert Louis Stevenson's Kidnapped, was released in 1921.

In the interwar period (i.e. 1918–1939), Burian became famous in Czechoslovakia as an illustrator of adventure novels and classic works. He collaborated with numerous publishers and illustrated Czech releases of the works of authors such as Jules Verne, Karl May, Jack London, Rudyard Kipling, and Daniel Defoe. Burian also illustrated books by Czech authors, such as Jaroslav Foglar, as well as explorers and travellers, such as Emil Holub, Alberto Vojtěch Frič, and Enrique Stanko Vráz. In terms of style, Burian was very much influenced by artists of the nineteenth century and never leaned towards any particular artistic movement.

Although Burian continued to paint artwork for adventure novels through most of his life and such art accounts for the greatest share of his output, he is for the most part only known internationally for his palaeontological and palaeoanthropological artwork. Burian is most well-known both in the Czech Republic and internationally for his oil paintings. In addition to these, he also produced many gouache paintings and line drawings.

== Palaeoart ==
=== Collaboration with Josef Augusta (1937–1968) ===
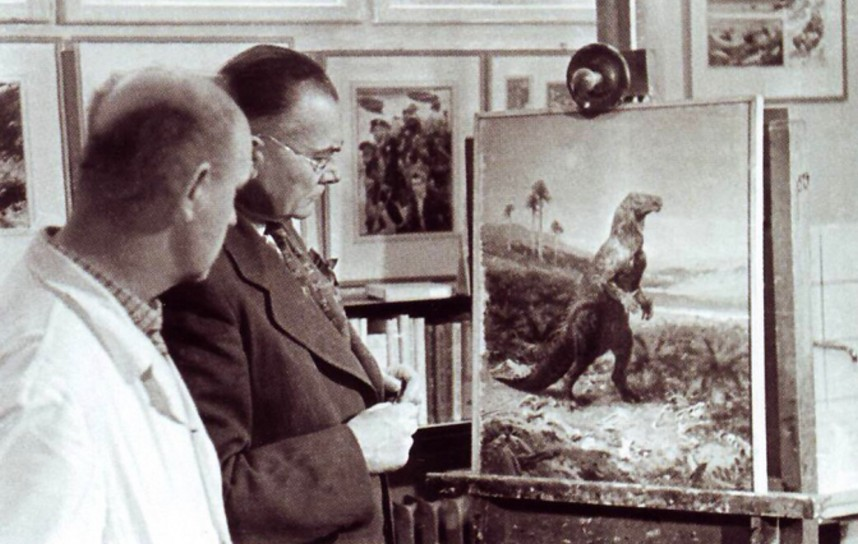
Burian (left) with Josef Augusta, looking at Burian's Iguanodon (1950)

Burian began painting artwork depicting prehistoric life in the 1930s, the first completed painting being a 1935 piece depicting two temnospondyls. He is known to have been inspired to pursue palaeoart by the paintings of the American painter Charles R. Knight, with additional inspiration perhaps also coming in the form of childhood experiences at fossil sites. In the twentieth century, it was common for palaeontological reconstructions to only be produced through the efforts of paired artists and palaeontological advisors and authors. There were several such pairs, although the pairing of Burian and the palaeontologist Josef Augusta remains one of the most famous. Augusta approached Burian about collaborating after Burian illustrated the adventure novel The Mammoth Hunters (Širým světem) by Eduard Štorch in 1937.

Burian's first painting known to have been completed with the advice and oversight of Augusta was a 1938 oil painting depicting Trachodons being attacked by a Tyrannosaurus rex. This painting, along with others, was published in the early 1940s in serials written by Augusta, called The Wonders of the Prehistoric World (Divy prasvěta). Prior to the end of the Nazi occupation of Czechoslovakia in 1945, Augusta and Burian's work was suppressed by the occupation authorities. Through the late 1940s, Burian illustrated several of Augusta's palaeontology-themed short stories. He would through the 1950s also go on to illustrate a number of books, collaborate with other researchers, and provide paintings for museums and other institutions.

The most well-known result of Augusta and Burian's collaboration was a series of six great volumes on prehistoric life published by Atria; Prehistoric Animals (1956), Prehistoric Man (1960), Prehistoric Reptiles and Birds (1961), The Book of Mammoths (1962), Prehistoric Sea Monsters (1964), and The Age of Monsters (1966). These large-format books were first only published in Czechoslovakia but eventually reached international publishers and garnered Burian popularity worldwide in countries such as Germany, France, England, Japan, and Italy. The American palaeontologist Stephen Jay Gould assessed Prehistoric Animals as one of the three most influential books on prehistory published in the twentieth century.

=== Later work (1968–1981) ===
A display showing some of Burian's palaeoart

Following Augusta's death in 1968, Burian collaborated with various other scientists. This later period of his career in palaeontological art also coincided with the discoveries and art trends of the Dinosaur renaissance, to which Burian reacted positively and worked to adapt. Even before the Dinosaur Renaissance, Burian worked to depict dinosaurs as active animals with mammal or bird-like musculature and limb movements, unlike many artists of his time. Among the artwork produced by Burian in the early 1970s is a painting of Velociraptor as an active and fast-moving creature, produced at a time when Robert Bakker's arguments for such depictions were still relatively unknown. Although Burian's early paintings of sauropod dinosaurs tended to depict them as sluggish animals, in-line with conceptions at the time, his later (after c. 1970) sauropods show them as active and fully terrestrial animals. In some cases, Burian was the first to paint certain ideas about the behaviours of prehistoric life, such as scenes with pterosaurs feeding their young.

Prominent scientists with whom Burian collaborated and illustrated books after 1968 include Zdeněk Špinar, Josef Wolf, Josef Beneš, and Vratislav Mazák. Under the advice of these researchers, Burian was able to incorporate new discoveries into his paintings, such as including pycnofibres on pterosaurs. Paintings produced by Burian after 1968 have sometimes been described as more "flat and uninteresting" than his previous work; he was during this time requested by publishers to portray animals in this way and to showcase them as individual figures rather than as part of a group. Many of the books published during this period nevertheless also reused many of the paintings and illustrations Burian had produced during the preceding time with Augusta, sometimes in slightly updated versions. In the 1960s, Burian also began collaborating with international authors and publishers, particularly in Italy.

=== Palaeoartistic style ===
Burian had no access to the actual fossil material of the different prehistoric animals he illustrated and painted. For the most part his work was based on illustrations and published descriptions of the bones. In the vast majority of cases, he only had a single photograph to serve as the basis of a painting. Despite this, Burian's work paid close attention to skeletal anatomy and form. For instance, he is considered in many cases to surpass Charles R. Knight in the adherence to the underlying skeletal anatomy of his animals, despite Knight often working more closely with museums and having access to their collections. Burian's process of reconstruction was a lengthy one. He began by creating several sketches for each scene, the most important of which were skeletal reconstructions of the animals to be depicted. These skeletal reconstructions, sometimes done in different poses, were sometimes followed by sketches of their musculature.

Burian's artwork has been described as having a certain romantic touch, absent in the majority of palaeoart produced after his time. The paintings are for the most part free of scenes depicting fighting or other brutality and are almost entirely without blood. In the few cases where fighting animals are depicted, it is usually just before any damage is done. There are several scenes where the animals, although depicted in a naturalistic manner, are imbued with personality, sympathy or antipathy, such as depictions of an old and lonely Iguanodon in a "cemetery of its species" (painted in 1950) or a famous painting of a "heroic" Tarbosaurus (painted in 1970).

Burian's palaeoartistic work was not limited to paintings of dinosaurs but depicted various prehistoric animals, as well as prehistoric plants and landscapes. He very rarely used the "overcrowded" format common in some historical palaeoart; this style pushed together several animal species into a confined landscape in order to be able to depict all of them. Burian's palaeoart is noteworthy for its uses of plants and environments. Many palaeoartists before (including Knight) and after Burian were highly "zoocentric", paying little attention to plants and relegating them either to simplistic renditions in the background or omitting them entirely. Compared with Knight's nearly universal use of plants such as palm trees and grass in the background, Burian's selection of plant life almost always appears plausible. His renditions of plants, although often also confined to the background, were always detailed and naturalistic. Several of Burian's paintings also include plant life as prominently as animals and some of his scenes are entirely devoid of animal life.

== Personal life ==
In the summer of 1924, Burian met Františka Loudová near Vyšehrad in Prague. The two were married on 14 February 1927. On 11 May that year, the couple had a daughter, Eva Hochmanová Burianová. Burian and his family lived in Vršovice in Prague until 1928, when they moved to an apartment in Žižkov (also in Prague). In 1956, they moved to Burian's most famous residence, a villa in Podolí.

In addition to painting prehistoric life out of personal interest and commissions, Burian saw his palaeoart as socially significant in that his paintings were used to spread scientific knowledge. Burian had a particular interest in human evolution and rejected the racist ideas that were still present in scholarship during much of his life; he is quoted to have said that further studies on human origins had the potential to "prove the absurdity of racist theories."

Františka died on 18 October 1979. Burian survived her by little over a year. He died on 1 July 1981 at the Na Františku hospital in Prague due to complications after surgery on the abdominal aorta.

== Legacy ==
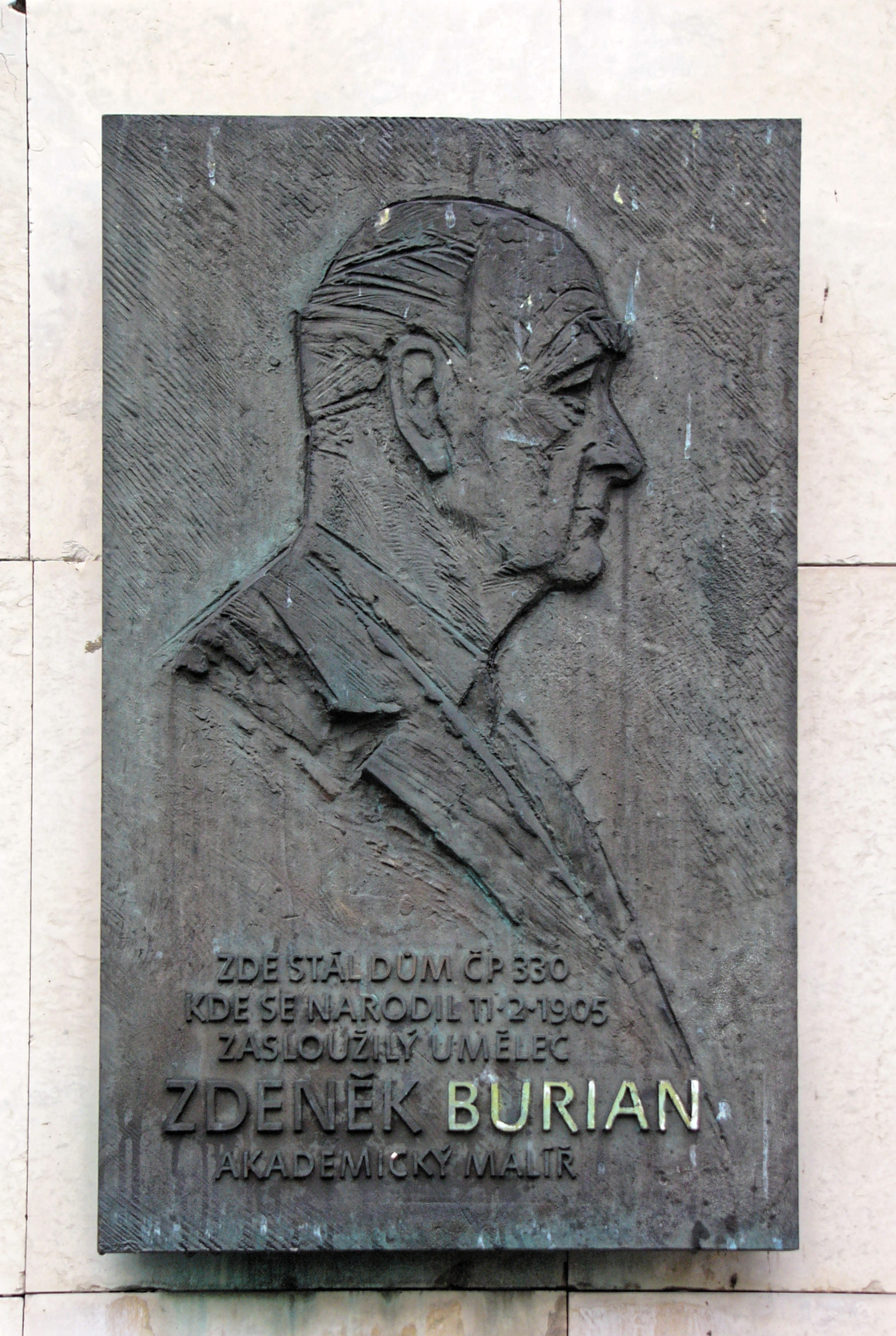
Memorial plaque of Zdeněk Burian in Kopřivnice

Many Burian paintings have become celebrated images of palaeontology and palaeoanthropology. In his native Czech Republic, his paintings are considered national treasures. Although he never achieved quite the same level of international recognition, Burian is sometimes regarded as a European counterpart to Charles R. Knight and he is widely seen as another master in the field. He is regarded as probably the most prolific painter of prehistoric life in twentieth-century Europe and one of the most influential palaeoartists. Particular palaeoartistic paintings by Burian that reached an iconic status and became widespread in the second half of the twentieth century include his Tyrannosaurus with Trachodon (1938), Brachiosaurus (1941), Iguanodon (1950), Brontosaurus (1950), and Tarbosaurus (1970). Burian's Brachiosaurus is one of the most widely used dinosaur paintings ever created. His Iguanodon painting has been referred to as "the most valuable work in the entire history of palaeoart".

It is not known precisely how many paintings Burian produced over the course of his career since he himself never compiled a listing of his work. His palaeontological and palaeoanthropological paintings are thought to number between 500 and 800, and the total number of paintings (including on other subjects) range from anywhere between 1000 and 20,000. In total, Burian's artwork and illustrations have been published in over 500 books. He also illustrated approximately 500 short stories and painted around 600 book covers. Numerous exhibitions with Burian's artwork have been held in the Czech Republic, the largest of which was held in Prague Castle in 2005.

Several of Burian's paintings and designs have been extensively copied by other artists. Some have even been used as the basis for merchandise, including toy designs. Burian's artwork was also influential when it came to depictions of dinosaurs and other prehistoric life in popular culture. Already in 1955, his designs served as the basis of the dinosaurs depicted in the Czech stop-motion film Journey to the Beginning of Time. It is possible that Burian's dinosaurs were among the inspirations for the original design of Godzilla. In 2015, Google Doodle commemorated his 110th birthday.

One of the streets in Burian's home town of Kopřivnice is named after him. In 2000, the minor planet 7867 Burian was named after him. The first validly described dinosaur found in the Czech Republic was in 2017 named Burianosaurus augustai in honour of both Burian and Josef Augusta.

== Partial bibliography ==
=== Palaeoartistic illustration ===
In total, Burian illustrated around two dozen books on palaeontology and palaeonthropology, as well as numerous magazine articles. In addition to several books published in Czechoslovakia, he produced paintings for various international books, including encyclopedias, textbooks, and children's books. The list below includes only the main works illustrated by Burian.

Illustrated books on prehistoric life written by Josef Augusta (1956–1966)

- Prehistoric Animals (1956), 60 plates
- Prehistoric Man (1960), 52 plates
- Prehistoric Reptiles and Birds (1961), 39 plates
- The Book of Mammoths (1962), 19 plates
- Prehistoric Sea Monsters (1964), 21 plates
- The Age of Monsters (1966), 23 plates

A seventh volume in the series, an entirely palaeobotanical book with the working title History of the Forests, was being prepared in 1967–1968. Burian painted 17 new paintings for this book, though it was never completed due to Augusta's death early in 1968.

Illustrated books on prehistoric life by other authors (1972–1980)

After Augusta's death, Burian worked with other scientists and illustrated four more main works on prehistoric life that were translated into English.

- Life Before Man (1972), written by Zdeněk Špinar.
- The Dawn of Man (1978), written by Josef Wolf.
- Prehistoric Animals and Plants (1979), written by Josef Beneš.
- Prehistoric Man (1980), written by Vratislav Mazák.

Life Before Man reused 130 paintings from the time of the earlier series of books by Augusta, although many of them had never before been published, and also included 27 new oil paintings commissioned specifically for it. The Dawn of Man likewise included both earlier artwork and new palaeoanthropological art produced in the 1970s. Both Prehistoric Animals and Plants and Prehistoric Man were "pocket-sized", contrary to earlier books. Both reused many older images (often cropped due to their smaller format) but also included new artwork, with Animals and Plants featuring sixteen new colour gouaches and Man featuring seven new gouaches and seven new oil paintings.

=== Posthumous art collections ===
Only a few attempts have been made to collect Burian's artwork in modern books. In addition to the volumes listed below, some of Burian's palaeoart was featured along work by several other 'classic' palaeoartists in the 2017 art book Paleoart: Visions of the Prehistoric Past by Zoë Lescaze.

- Die verlorenen Welten des Zdeněk Burian (2013), German-language art book collecting 230 of Burian's palaeoartistic paintings.

Since 2016, much of Burian's artwork has been collected and published in large Czech-language monographs in the series "The Worlds of Zdeněk Burian", a project headed by Ondřej Müller, Rostislav Walica, and Ondrej Neff. The series is slated to encompass six volumes, out of which four have so far been published.

- Dobrodružný svět Zdeňka Buriana (2016), adventure novel artwork 1921–1947.
- Podivuhodný svět Zdeňka Buriana (2018), artwork produced for Jules Verne novels 1930s–1940s.
- Zapomenutý svět Zdeňka Buriana (2020), obscure and often never before published artwork.
- Pravěký svět Zdeňka Buriana (2022–), three-volume set of monographs collecting Burian's palaeoart.
  - I: Od vzniku Země po zánik dinosaurů (2022), Palaeozoic and Mesozoic artwork. The volume includes 412 illustrations (not just paintings but also other illustrations and sketches), encompassing all of Burian's known pre-Cenozoic palaeoart.
  - II: Monstra Třetihor a Čtvrtohor (upcoming 2024), Cenozoic artwork.
  - III: Cesta k Člověku (upcoming), palaeoanthropological artwork
