= Ostroměř =

- Municipality
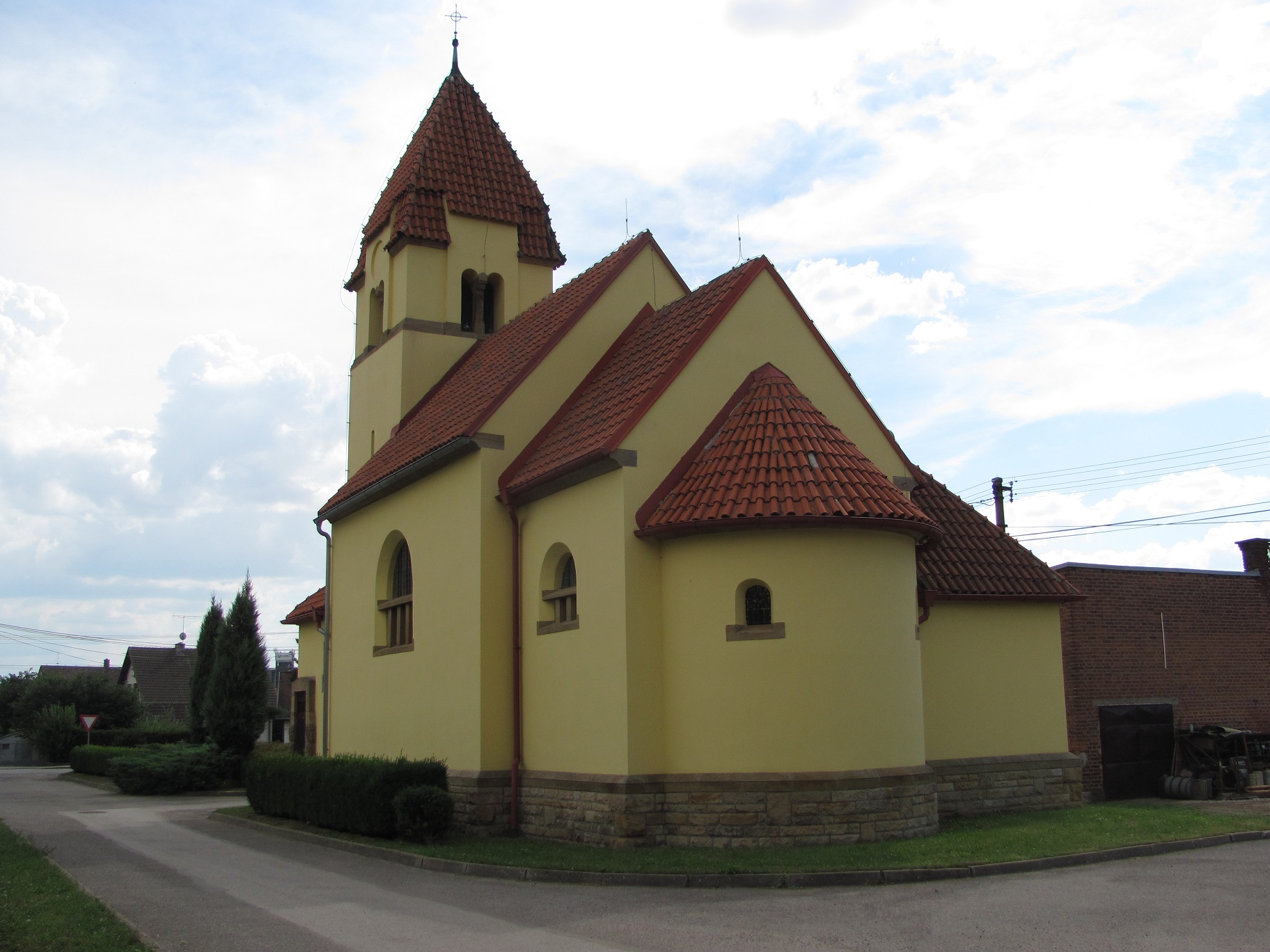
- Church of the Holy Trinity

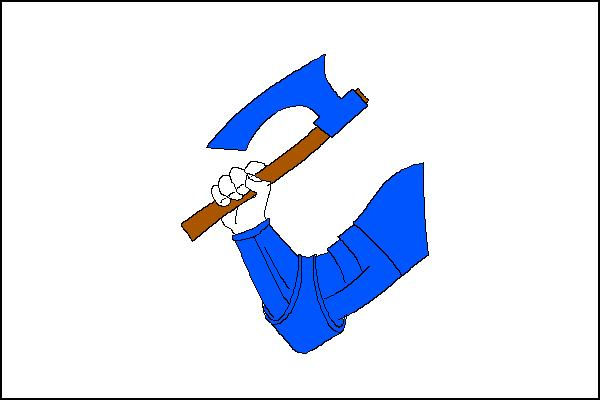
- Flag Coat of arms

- Location in the Czech Republic
- Coordinates: 50°22′28″N 15°32′53″E
- Country: Czech Republic
- Region: Hradec Králové
- District: Jičín
- First mentioned: 1382

Area
  - Total: 12.35 km^{2} (4.77 sq mi)
- Elevation: 263 m (863 ft)

Population (2026-01-01)
  - Total: 1,339
  - Density: 108.4/km^{2} (280.8/sq mi)
- Time zone: UTC+1 (CET)
  - Summer (DST): UTC+2 (CEST)
- Postal codes: 507 52, 508 01
- Website: www.ostromer.cz

Ostroměř is a municipality and village in Jičín District in the Hradec Králové Region of the Czech Republic. It has about 1,300 inhabitants.

== Administrative division ==
Ostroměř consists of four municipal parts (in brackets population according to the 2021 census):

- Ostroměř (1,124)
- Domoslavice (99)
- Nové Smrkovice (48)
- Sylvárův Újezd (45)

== Demographics ==
Historical population
Year	Pop.	±%
1869	1,225	—
1880	1,479	+20.7%
1890	1,589	+7.4%
1900	1,631	+2.6%
1910	1,709	+4.8%
1921	1,764	+3.2%
1930	1,843	+4.5%
1950	1,426	−22.6%
1961	1,466	+2.8%
1970	1,448	−1.2%
1980	1,291	−10.8%
1991	1,410	+9.2%
2001	1,372	−2.7%
2011	1,321	−3.7%
2021	1,316	−0.4%
Source: Censuses

== Notable people ==
- Eduard Štorch (1878–1956), writer and archaeologist
- Karel Zeman (1910–1989), film director
