= Vratislav Mazák =

Czech biologist

Vratislav Mazák (Czech pronunciation: [ˈvracɪslaf ˈmazaːk]; 22 June 1937 – 9 September 1987) was a Czech biologist who specialized in paleoanthropology, mammalogy and taxonomy. He was also a painter, often illustrating his books about animals and men.

Born at Kutná Hora, he was a professor at the Charles University's Faculty of Science and worked as a zoologist at the Prague National Museum. With Colin Groves, Mazák described, named and classified the early hominin Homo ergaster. He also described the tiger subspecies Panthera tigris corbetti.

He died of cancer in Prague.

== Major publications ==
=== In Czech ===
- Naši savci (1970), Our Mammals
- Kostra velryby v Národním muzeu v Praze a krátký pohled do světa kytovců (1976), The skeleton of the whale in the Prague National Museum and a brief look into the world of cetaceans
- Jak vznikl člověk: Sága rodu Homo (1977), The Origin of Man - Saga of the genus Homo; with Zdeněk Burian
- Velké kočky a gepardi (1980), Big cats and cheetahs
- Jak vznikl člověk: (Sága rodu Homo) (1986), The Origin of Man—Saga of the genus Homo, a revised and enlarged edition; with Zdeněk Burian
- Kytovci (1988), Cetaceans
- Pravěký člověk (1992), Prehistoric Man; with Zdeněk Burian

=== In German ===
- Der Tiger: Panthera tigris Linnaeus, 1758 (1965)
- Die Namen der Pelztiere und ihrer Felle (1974)
- Der Tiger: Panthera tigris (1979)
- Der Urmensch und seine Vorfahren (1983)

== See also ==
- Konstantin Satunin
