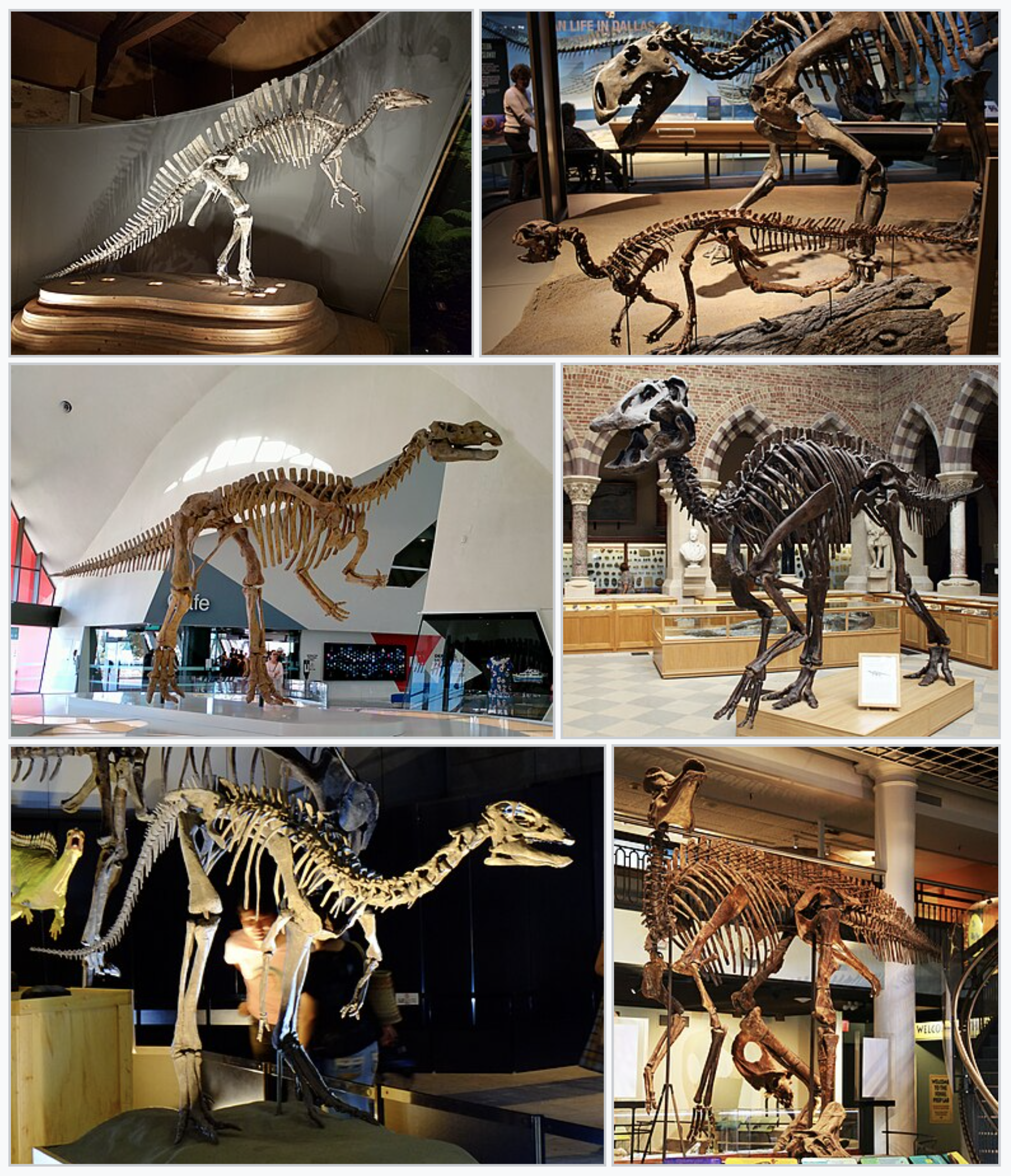
- Seven archetypal ornithopods (top left to bottom right): Ouranosaurus, Tenontosaurus (background) with Convolosaurus (foreground), Muttaburrasaurus, Edmontosaurus annectens, Dryosaurus altus, Corythosaurus casuarius

Scientific classification
- Kingdom: Animalia
- Phylum: Chordata
- Class: Reptilia
- Clade: Dinosauria
- Clade: †Ornithischia
- Clade: †Cerapoda
- Clade: †Ornithopoda; Marsh, 1881

Subgroups
- †Hypsilophodontidae
- †Iguanodontia Baur, 1891
  - †Burianosaurus?
  - †Callovosaurus
  - †Emiliasaura
  - †Muttaburrasaurus?
  - †Vectidromeus
  - †Elasmaria?
  - †Rhabdodontomorpha
  - †Dryomorpha Sereno, 1986
    - †Cumnoria
    - †Draconyx
    - †Hesperonyx
    - †Owenodon
    - †Dryosauridae
    - †Ankylopollexia
Possible members
- †Changmiania
- †Kulindadromeus
- †Nanosaurus
- †Yandusaurus
- †Thescelosauridae (paraphyletic?)

Synonyms
- ?Clypeodonta? Norman, 2014; ?Euornithopoda Sereno, 1986; ?Hypsilophodontia Cooper, 1985

= Ornithopoda =

Ornithopods Temporal range: Bathonian - Maastrichtian, 164–66 Ma

Clade of dinosaurs

Ornithopoda (/ˌɔːrnəˈθɒpədə/) is a clade of ornithischian dinosaurs, called ornithopods (/ˈɔːrnəθəˌpɒdz, ɔːrˈnɪθ-/). They represent one of the most successful groups of herbivorous dinosaurs during the Cretaceous. The most primitive members of the group were bipedal and relatively small-sized, while advanced members of the subgroup Iguanodontia became quadrupedal and developed large body size. Their major evolutionary advantage was the progressive development of a chewing apparatus that became the most sophisticated ever developed by a non-avian dinosaur, rivaling that of modern mammals such as the domestic cow. They reached their apex of diversity and ecological dominance in the hadrosaurids (colloquially known as 'duck-bills'), before they were wiped out by the Cretaceous–Paleogene extinction event along with all other non-avian dinosaurs. Members are known worldwide.

== History of research ==
In 1870, Thomas Henry Huxley listed Iguanodontidae (coined by Edward Drinker Cope a year earlier) as one of his three families of dinosaurs (alongside Megalosauridae and Scelidosauridae), including within it the genera Iguanodon, Hypsilophodon, and Hadrosaurus, in addition to Cetiosaurus and tentatively Stenopelix. The term Ornithopoda was erected by Othniel Charles Marsh in 1881 as part of his then still ongoing investigation of the classification of Dinosauria. It was considered one of the four definite orders of dinosaurs, the others being Theropoda, Sauropoda, and Stegosauria (Hallopoda was considered a possible fifth). He subdivided the order into three families: Camptonotidae, Iguanodontidae, and Hadrosauridae; the former was a new name, whereas the latter two were carried over from the nomenclatures of Huxley and Edward Drinker Cope respectively. Within Camptonotidae he included the European Hypsilophodon and three American taxa he named himself, Camptonotus, Laosaurus, and Nanosaurus. Camptonotus was in 1885 renamed to Camptosaurus, as the original name was pre-occupied by a cricket; the associated family followed suit, becoming Camptosauridae. In Iguanodontidae, only found in Europe, he included Iguanodon and Vectisaurus. In Hadrosauridae, he included Hadrosaurus, Cionodon, and tentatively Agathaumas.

== Description ==
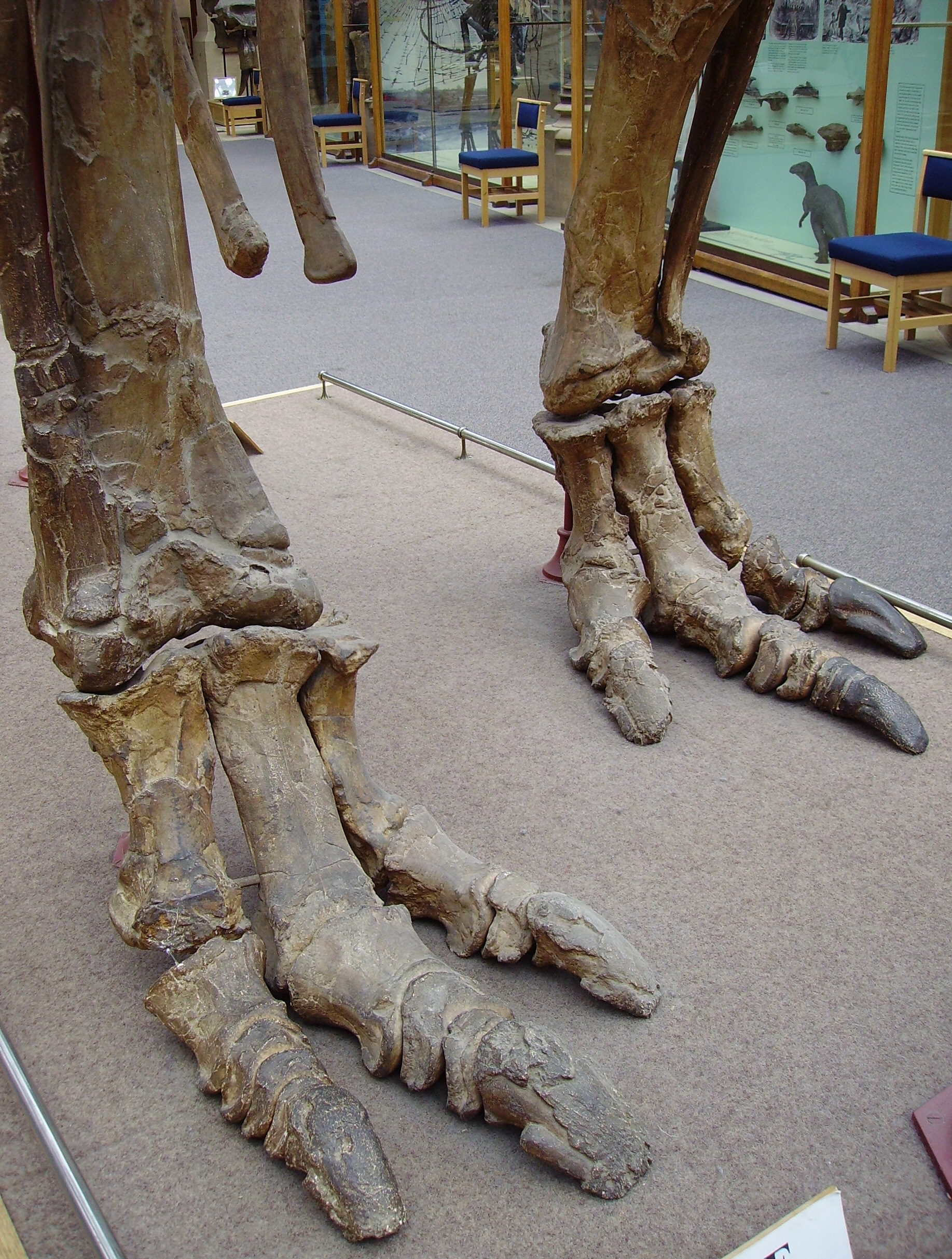
Three-toed feet of Iguanodon

Ornithopoda means "bird feet", from the Greek ornithos, ornis ("bird") and pous, podos ("feet"); this is in reference to members' characteristic birdlike feet. They were also characterized as lacking in body armour, not developing a horny beak, having an elongated pubis (that eventually extended past the ilium), and having a missing hole in the lower jaw (a Mandibular fenestra). A variety of ornithopods, and related ornithischians, had thin cartilaginous plates along the outside of the ribs; in some cases, these plates mineralized and were fossilized. The function of these intercostal plates is unknown. They have been found with Hypsilophodon, Nanosaurus, Parksosaurus, Talenkauen, Thescelosaurus, and Macrogryphosaurus to date.

The early ornithopods were only about 1 metre (3 feet) long, but probably very fast. They had a stiff tail, like the theropods, to help them balance as they ran on their hind legs. Later ornithopods became more adapted to grazing on all fours; their spines curved, and came to resemble the spines of modern ground-feeders, such as the bison. As they became more adapted to eating while bent over, they became facultative quadrupeds; still running on two legs, and comfortable reaching up into trees, but spending most of their time walking or grazing on all fours. The taxonomy of dinosaurs previously ascribed to the Hypsilophodontidae is problematic. The group previously consisted of all non-iguanodontian bipedal ornithischians, but a phylogenetic reappraisal has shown such species to be paraphyletic. As such, the hypsilophodont family is currently represented only by Hypsilophodon.

Later ornithopods became larger, but never rivalled the incredible size of the long-necked, long-tailed sauropods. The very largest, such as Shantungosaurus, were as heavy as medium-sized sauropods (up to 23 metric tons/25 short tons), but never grew much beyond 15 metres (50 feet).

Based on evidence derived from examination of dental microwear, early ornithopods were mainly browsers or frugivores, whereas larger, more derived iguanodontians were bulk feeders that fed on tougher, less nutritious vegetation and were able to subsist on it due to their long gut passage time.

== Classification ==
Size of a variety of numerous ornithopods

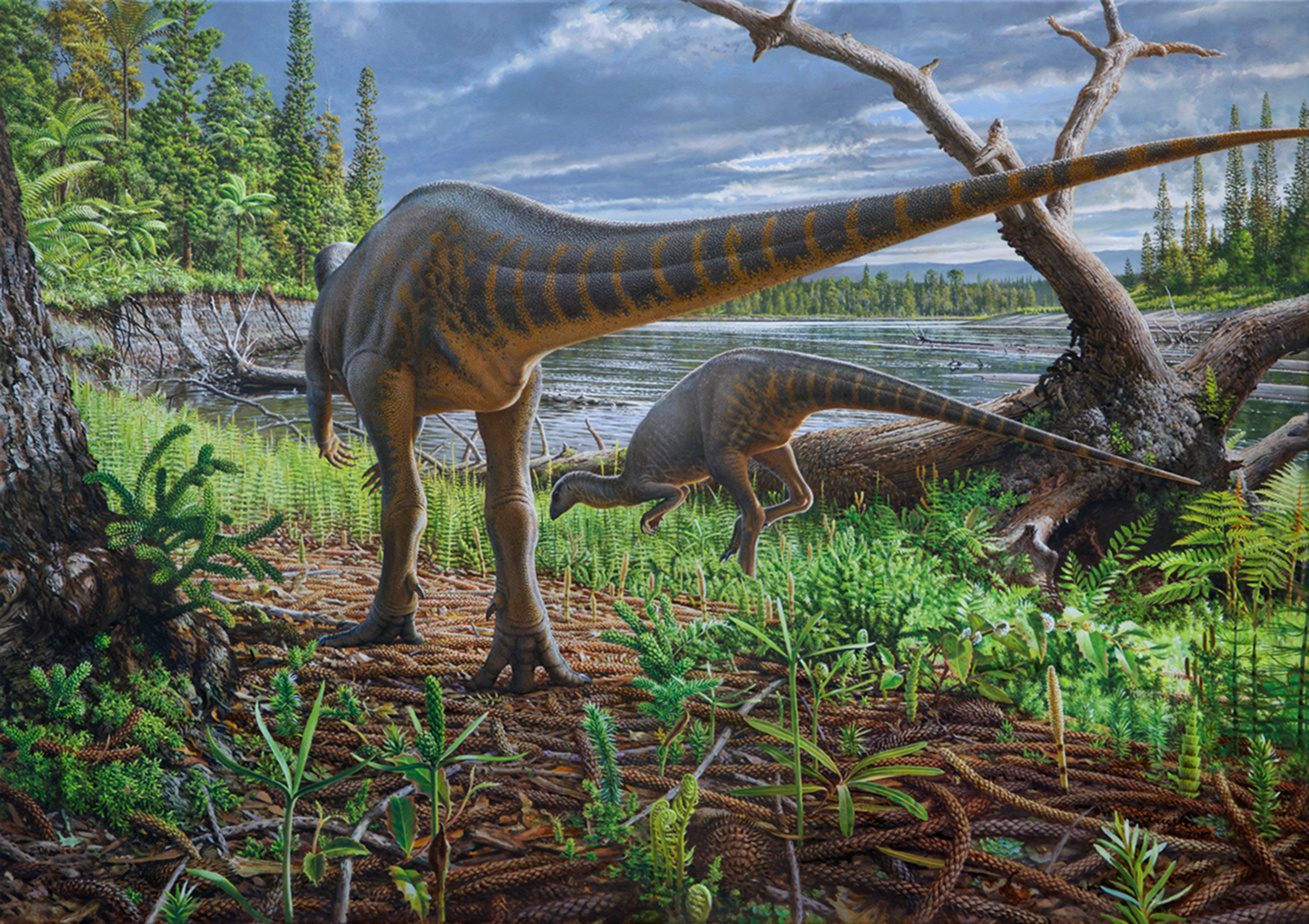
An artist's interpretation of Diluvicursor, an elasmarian

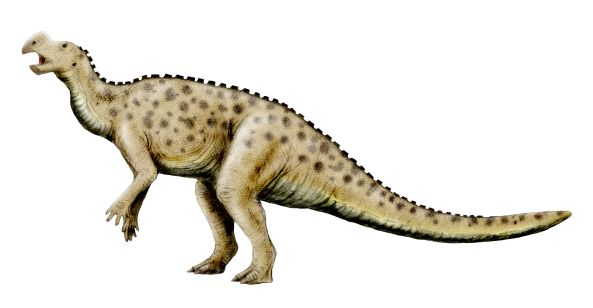
Restoration of Muttaburrasaurus, an early iguanodont

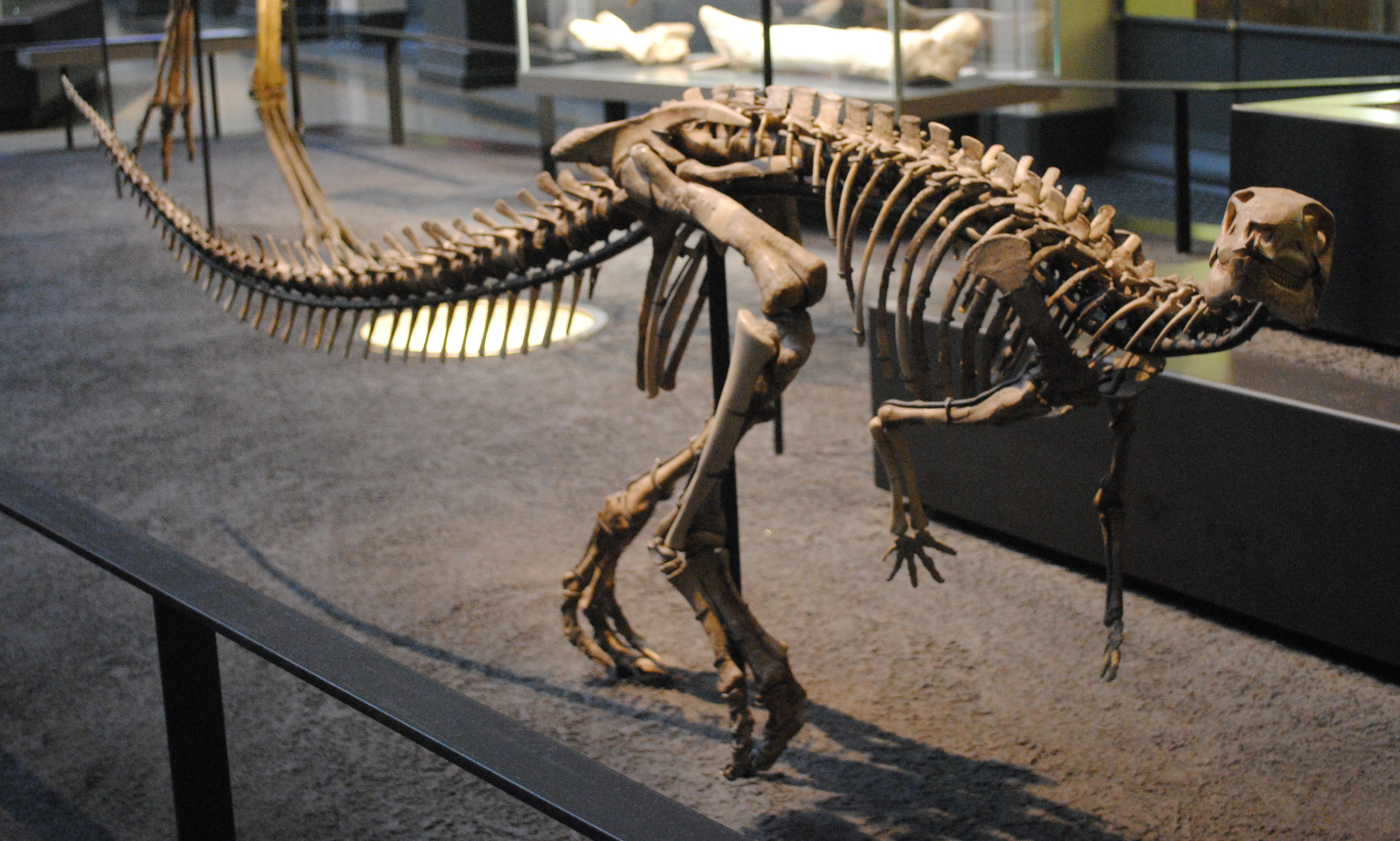
Skeleton of Dysalotosaurus, a dryosaurid ornithopod from the Jurassic

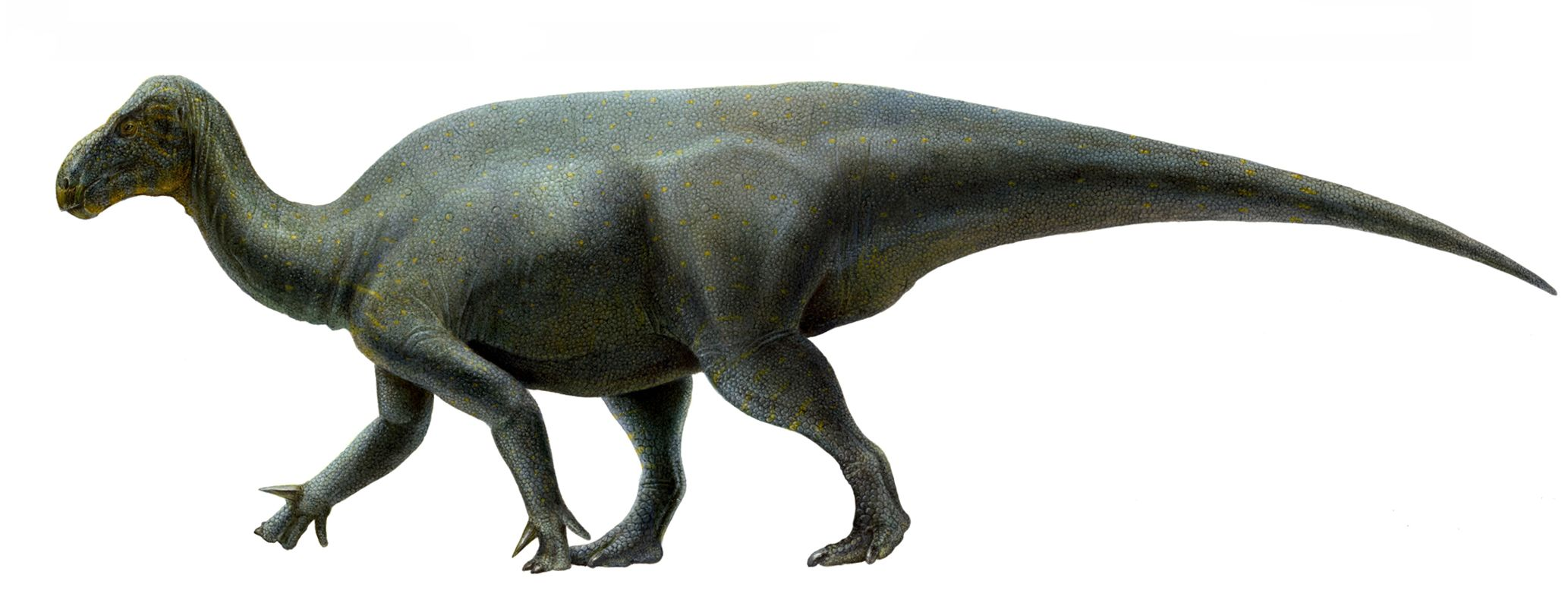
Life restoration of Iguanacolossus, a styracosternan

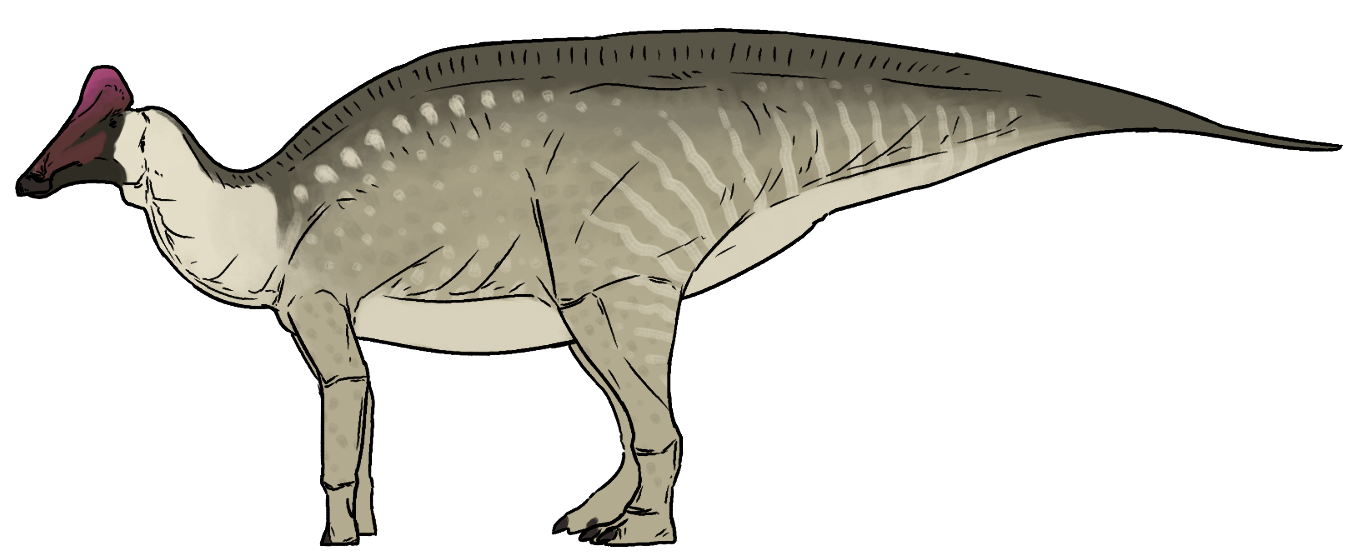
Life restoration of Amurosaurus, a lambeosaurine hadrosaur, and one of the last ornithopods

Historically, most indeterminate ornithischian bipeds were lumped in as ornithopods. Most have since been reclassified.

=== Taxonomy ===
Ornithopoda is usually given the rank of Suborder, within the order Ornithischia. While ranked taxonomy has largely fallen out of favour among dinosaur paleontologists, some researchers have continued to employ such a classification, though sources have differed on what its rank should be. Benton (2004) placed it as an infraorder within the suborder Cerapoda (originally named as an unranked clade), while others, such as Ibiricu et al. 2010, have retained it at its traditional ranking of suborder.

Iguanodontia is often listed as an infraorder within a suborder Ornithopoda, though Benton (2004) lists Ornithopoda as an infraorder and does not rank Iguanodontia. Traditionally, iguanodontians were grouped into the superfamily Iguanodontoidea and family Iguanodontidae. However, phylogenetic studies show that the traditional "iguanodontids" are a paraphyletic grade leading up to the hadrosaurs (duck-billed dinosaurs). Groups like Iguanodontoidea are sometimes still used as unranked clades in the scientific literature, though many traditional "iguanodontids" are now included in the more inclusive group Hadrosauroidea. Iguanodontia was originally phylogenetically defined, by Paul Sereno, in 1998, as the most inclusive group containing Parasaurolophus walkeri but not Hypsilophodon foxii. Later, in 2005, he amended the definition to include Thescelosaurus neglectus as a secondary external specifier, alongside Hypsilophodon, accounting for the paraphyletic nature of Hypsilophodontidae. A 2017 study which named and described Burianosaurus noted that the type species Iguanodon bernissartensis must be part of the definition, and that the 2005 definition would, in their analysis, include a far larger group than intended (including Marginocephalia). They proposed an entirely new, node-based definition: the last common ancestor of Iguanodon bernissartensis, Dryosaurus altus, Rhabdodon priscus, and Tenontosaurus tilletti.

In 2021, Iguanodontia was given a formal definition under the PhyloCode: "The smallest clade containing Dryosaurus altus, Iguanodon bernissartensis, Rhabdodon priscus, and Tenontosaurus tilletti, provided that it does not include Hypsilophodon foxii." Under this revised definition, Iguanodontia is limited to its traditionally included species, and if it were found to include hypsilophodonts, which were not traditionally considered iguanodontians, it would become an invalid grouping.

The slightly less inclusive clade Dryomorpha was named by Paul Sereno in 1986 and given a formal definition in the PhyloCode as "the smallest clade containing Dryosaurus altus and Iguanodon bernissartensis". This group includes basal members such as Hesperonyx, members of the family Dryosauridae, and the derived clade Ankylopollexia.

=== Phylogeny ===
In 2021, Ornithopoda was given a formal definition under the PhyloCode: "The largest clade containing Iguanodon bernissartensis but not Pachycephalosaurus wyomingensis and Triceratops horridus." The cladogram below follows a 2024 analysis of Fonseca et al.

- Pyrodontia
  - Thescelosauridae
  - - Kulindadromeus
    - Cerapoda
      - Marginocephalia
      - Ornithopoda
        - Hypsilophodontidae
          - Gideonmantellia
          - Hypsilophodon
        - Iguanodontia
          - Rhabdodontomorpha
            - Tenontosauridae
            - Rhabdodontoidea
          - Euiguanodontia
            - - Anabisetia
              - Diluvicursor
            - - Gasparinisaura
              - Notohypsilophodon
            - Elasmaria
            - - Iyuku
              - Dryomorpha
                - Dryosauridae
                - - CM 1949
                  - - Oblitosaurus
                    - Ankylopollexia
