= Zdeněk Špinar =

Czech paleontologist and author

Zdeněk Špinar (4 April 1916, Čáslav – 14 August 1995, Prysk) was a Czech paleontologist and author. He was renowned in the field for popularising vertebrate paleontology. He specialised in the paleontology of amphibians, especially anurans. Many of his studies remain heavily cited. He is also known for a scientific collaboration with painter Zdeněk Burian.
