= Hesperonyx =

Hesperonyx Temporal range: Late Jurassic, late Kimmeridgian
- Skeletal reconstruction

Scientific classification
- Kingdom: Animalia
- Phylum: Chordata
- Class: Reptilia
- Clade: Dinosauria
- Clade: †Ornithischia
- Clade: †Ornithopoda
- Clade: †Dryomorpha
- Genus: †Hesperonyx; Rotatori et al., 2024
- Species: †H. martinhotomasorum

Binomial name
- †Hesperonyx martinhotomasorum Rotatori et al., 2024

Genus of ornithopod dinosaurs

Hesperonyx (meaning "western claw") is an extinct genus of dryomorphan ornithopod dinosaur from the Late Jurassic Lourinhã Formation of Portugal. The genus contains a single species, Hesperonyx martinhotomasorum, known from bones of the fore- and hindlimbs.

== Discovery and naming ==
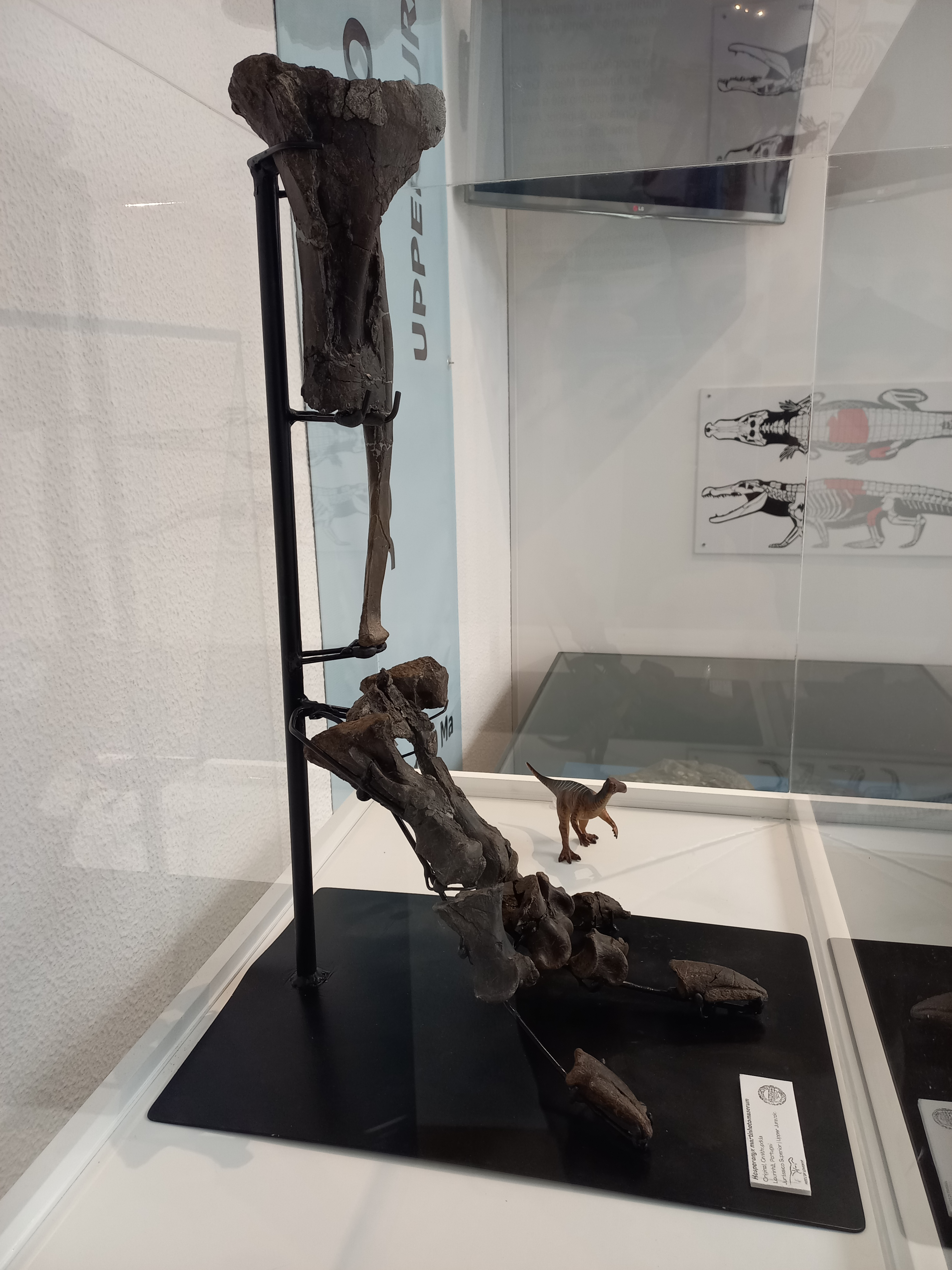
Holotype hindlimb

The Hesperonyx holotype specimen, ML 2700, was discovered in 2021 in sediments of the Lourinhã Formation (Porto Novo Member) along the beach at Porto Dinheiro. The specimen consists of bones from the left forelimb (a hand claw, ulnare, and partial metacarpal) and hindlimb (the tibia, fibula, most of metatarsals I–IV, remains of five phalanges, and three toe claws).

In 2024, Rotatori et al. described Hesperonyx martinhotomasorum as a new genus and species of ornithopod dinosaurs based on these fossil remains. The generic name, "Hesperonyx", combines "Hesperus" (or the "Evening Star"), after the Greek god whose name also references the western direction—referencing the holotype locality in the west region of Portugal—with the Greek suffix "-onyx", meaning "claw". The specific name, "martinhotomasorum", combines the last names of Micael Martinho and Carla Alexandra Tomás, honoring their efforts in fossil curation and preparation at the Museu da Lourinhã.

== Description ==
Size compared to a human

Hesperonyx is estimated as being 3–4 metres (9.8–13.1 ft) long.

== Classification ==
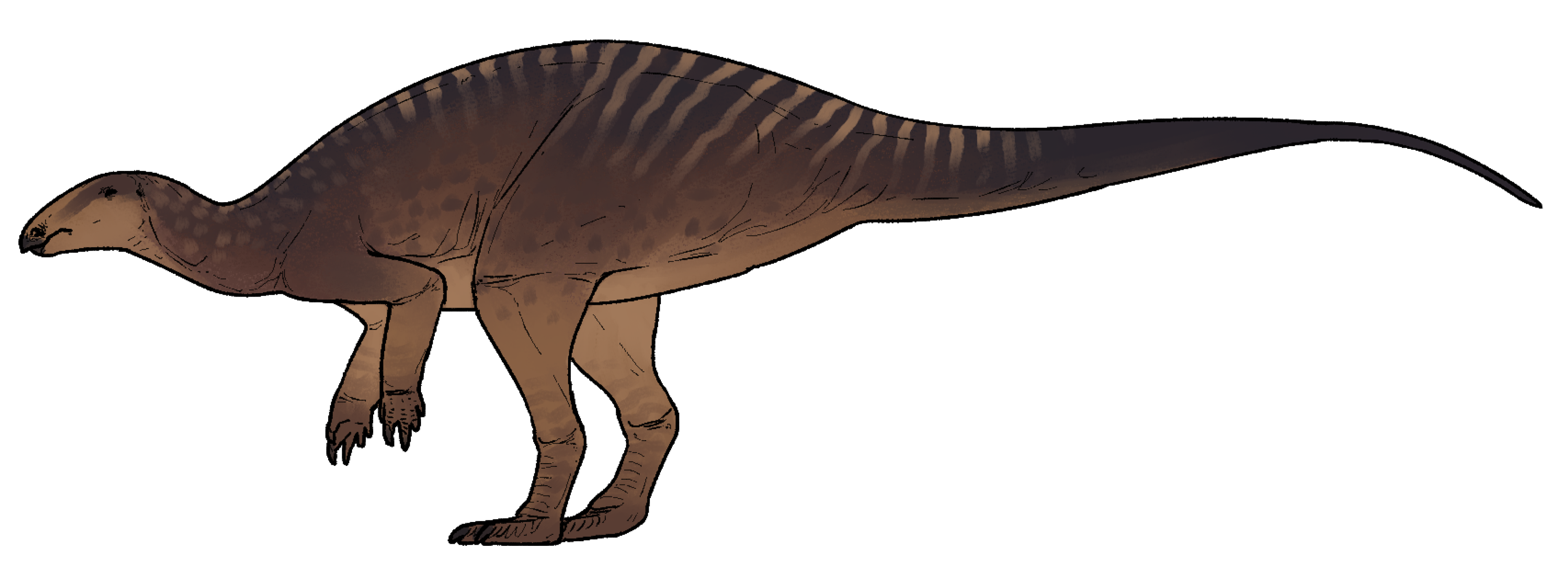
Life restoration

Rotatori et al. (2024) included Hesperonyx in two phylogenetic analyses, recovering it in contrasting locations within the Dryomorpha. In their parsimony analyses (both with equal and implied weighting), Hesperonyx was placed as a basal member of the clade of non-dryosaurid dryomorphans. However, in their Bayesian analysis, Hesperonyx was recovered as a basal member of the Dryosauridae. More precise affinities could not be concluded due to the paucity of remains. Their results are displayed in the cladograms below:

Topology 1: Parsimony analysis (equal weighting)

- Iguanodontia
  - Tenontosaurus spp.
  - - Rhabdodontomorpha
    - - Elasmaria
      - Dryomorpha
        - Dryosauridae
          - Eousdryosaurus
          - - Valdosaurus
            - Dysalotosaurus
            - Dryosaurus spp.
        - - Hesperonyx
          - - Uteodon
            - - SHN.015.JJS.LPP
              - - Draconyx
                - Ankylopollexia
                  - Iguanodon bernissartensis
                  - Camptosaurus

Topology 2: Bayesian analysis

- Iguanodontia
  - - Tenontosaurus spp.
    - Elasmaria
  - Dryomorpha
    - Dryosauridae
      - Hesperonyx
      - - Dryosaurus spp.
        - - Eousdryosaurus
          - - Dysalotosaurus
            - Valdosaurus
    - - Uteodon
      - Ankylopollexia
        - Camptosaurus
        - Iguanodon bernissartensis

== Paleoenvironment ==
The Lourinhã Formation is one of the major fossiliferous formations of Portugal, preserving many species of dinosaurs, some of which are also known from the contemporaneous Morrison Formation of North America. Hesperonyx is the third named iguanodontian known from this formation, after Draconyx and Eousdryosaurus.
