= Prague Organ School =

School for church musicians in Bohemia

The Prague Organ School (Czech: Varhanická škola v Praze) was a school for church musicians in Prague in Bohemia. It was founded in 1830 and taught subjects such as organ, harmony, counterpoint, improvisation, choral singing, music history, conducting, and the foundations of composition. In 1890 it was incorporated into the Prague Conservatory.

== History ==
The Prague Organ School was founded by the Association of Friends of Church Music in Bohemia (Jednota k zvelebení kostelní hudby v Čechách or Spolek pro pěstování hudby církevní v Čechách). It was the first school of its kind in Austria-Hungary. Initially a one-year program, the school was called Ústav pro hudbu chrámovou (Institute for Church Music) or Ústav ku vzdělání varhaníků a ředitelů kůru (Institute for the Training of Organists and Choir Directors). In 1835, the program was extended to two years, and in 1873, František Zdeněk Skuherský, in his capacity as school director, extended it to three years.

The sponsoring association aimed to improve the training of church musicians in Bohemia and raise the quality of church music with this organ school. During its sixty years of independent operation, the school developed into a significant educational institution that far exceeded the original ambitions of its founders. It was highly regarded for its high standards, and entire generations of Czech organists and composers passed through its doors, including figures such as Antonín Dvořák, Josef Bohuslav Foerster, and Leoš Janáček. The Prague Organ School also accepted students from other parts of Austria-Hungary and, on rare occasions, from abroad. It was highly sought after despite the concurrent existence of the Prague Conservatory (founded in 1808), as the Conservatory focused primarily on training orchestral musicians and did not teach organ playing, composition, conducting, or pedagogy. From an initial intake of twenty, the number of students increased sharply in the following years; by the 1870s, the school had more than one hundred students across its three grade levels. The language of instruction was initially German, later increasingly Czech.

The subjects taught included organ playing, harmony, counterpoint, improvisation, church singing, music history, conducting, and the fundamentals of composition. From 1866, the organ builder Karl Schiffner also offered lectures on organ building. The school also offered a training program for music teachers at German and Czech schools, with organ, harmony, and singing as subjects.

In 1890, the Prague Organ School was incorporated into the Prague Conservatory, and all the organ school's teachers transferred to the Conservatory. The curriculum at the Conservatory was reorganized, and new subjects were added—piano, organ, composition, conducting, score reading, instrumentation, and form. Only from this point onward did the Conservatory offer a complete musical education for performers and composers.

== Directors of the school ==
- Jan August Vitásek (1830–1839), founding member of the sponsoring association
- Robert Führer (1839–1840), the first teacher of the organ school
- Bedřich Diviš Weber (1840–1842), also director of the Prague Conservatory
- František Blažek (1842–1843)
- Karel František Pitsch (1843–1858)
- Josef Leopold Zvonař (1858)
- Josef Krejčí (1859–1865)
- František Zdeněk Skuherský (1866–1889), until the merger with the Conservatory

== Notable students ==
- Eduard Nápravník (1839–1916)
- Karel Bendl (1838–1897)
- Antonín Dvořák (1841–1904)
- Leoš Janáček (1854–1928)
- Josef Bohuslav Foerster (1859–1951)
- Ludvík Kuba (1863–1956)
