= Vrbno (Hořín) =

Coordinates: 50°19′N 14°27′E

Vrbno u Mělníka
- Village
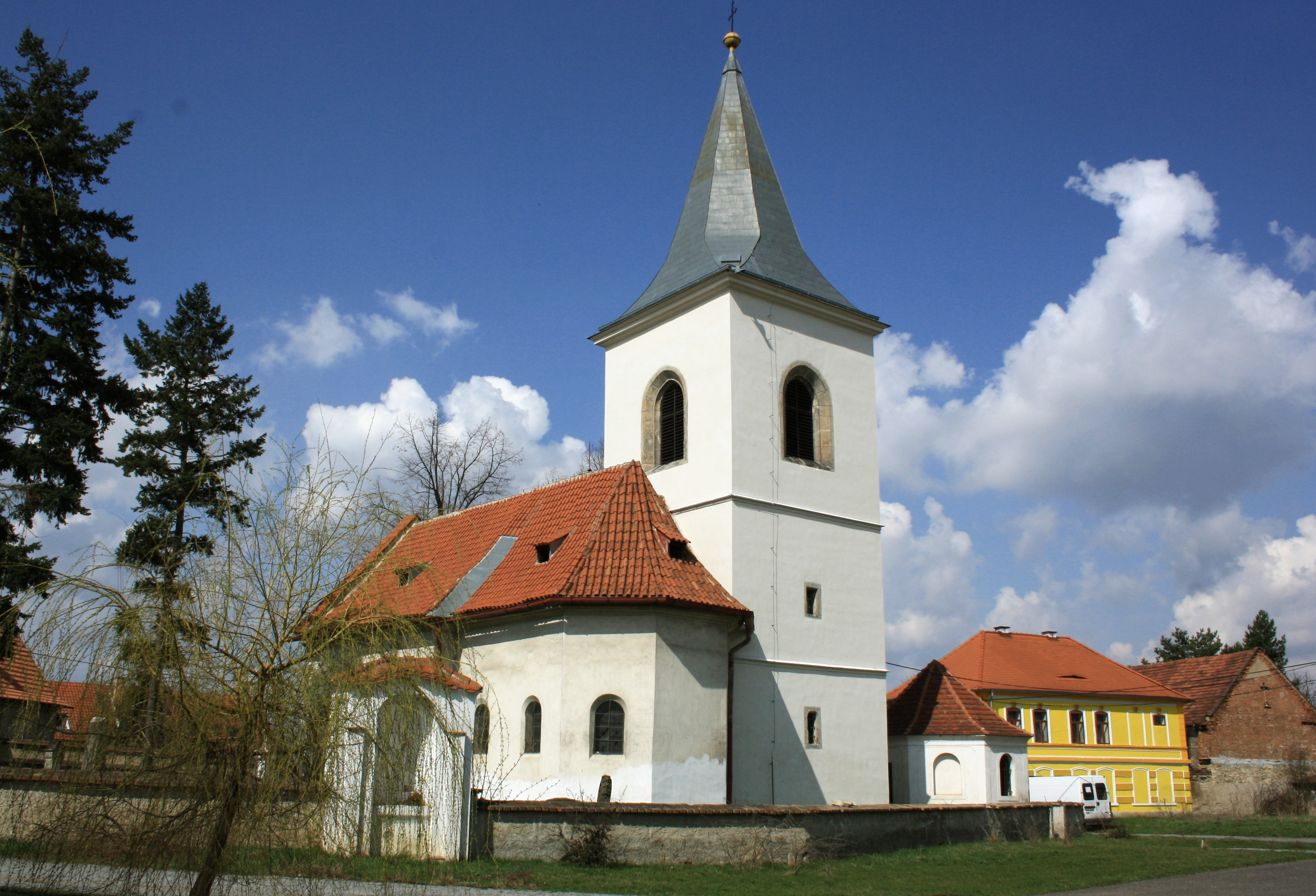
- Interactive map of Vrbno u Mělníka
- Country: Czech Republic
- Region: Central Bohemian Region
- District: Mělník District
- Municipality: Hořín
- Established: 11th century
- Elevation: 528 ft (161 m)

Population (2001)
  - Total: 98
- Time zone: UTC+1 (CET)
  - Summer (DST): UTC+2 (CEST)
- Postal code: 27601

Vrbno is a village, part of the municipality of Hořín in the district of Mělník in the Central Bohemian Region of the Czech Republic, located approximately 2.5 km southwest of Hořín. The village lies in the left bank of the Vltava. There are 81 registered addresses and 98 permanent residents.

== History ==
Vrbno was founded probably in the 11th or 12th century in the area inhabited since the 5th millennium before Christ. Mentioned for the first time in 1241 it was the possession of the Queens of Bohemia who owned the castle of Mělník. Then in the 14th century it was enlarged by Queen Elisabeth of Bohemia, the wife of John of Bohemia, and divided between the Queen's dominion of Mělník and the local noble family which sold its possession to the Knights of the Cross of the Red Star. This division remained unchanged till the Revolution of 1848, and then Vrbno became a municipality with three cadastral areas. In 1932 there lived 496 permanent residents. Because of the decreasing number of inhabitants, it was united with adjacent municipalities of Hořín and Brozánky in 1960. During the European floods in 2002 the whole village was flooded, many buildings seriously damaged, the third part of addresses destroyed. Nevertheless, the centre of Vrbno was put on the list of the Village Monuments Areas in 2004. For its untouched picturesque atmosphere Vrbno became a place where many movies were taken, e.g. about Jules Maigret and Les Misérables.

== Monuments ==
- Church of the Exaltation of the Cross, built in the 12th century, enlarged in the following centuries, with cemetery and baroque chapels of St. Barbara and St. John of Nepomuk.
- Building of the Roman Catholic presbytery No. 1, built in 1862.
- Building if the former first school No. 60 with geographical wall paintings, built in 1878.
- Building of former pub and cultural centre of the village No. 27.
- Chapel of the Holy Wounds of Jesus, built in 1705.
- Memorial of the First World War, built in 1919.
- Lateral canal Mělník – Vraňany, built in 1905.
