= Josef Augusta (paleontologist) =

Czech paleontologist, geologist, and science popularizer

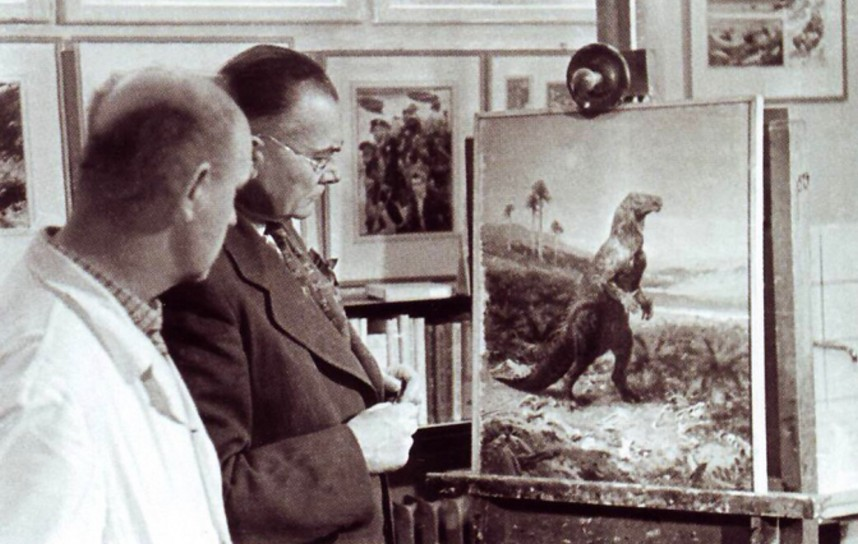
Josef Augusta (center), with Zdeněk Burian (left), examining one of Burian's paintings

Josef Augusta (17 March 1903, Boskovice, Moravia – 4 February 1968, Prague) was a Czech paleontologist, geologist, and science popularizer.

From 1921 to 1925 Augusta studied at the Masaryk University in Brno. Between 1933 and 1968 he held posts at the Charles University in Prague as lecturer, professor, and dean of the faculty.

In addition to his scientific work (about 120 publications), Augusta wrote about twenty books popularizing his profession, mostly targeted to the youth. He is best known for his reconstructions of fossil flora and fauna, together with the painter Zdeněk Burian (1905–1981). He participated as a science adviser in the movie Journey to the Beginning of Time (1954).

The dinosaur Burianosaurus augustai was named after him and artist Zdenek Burian in 2017.

== See also ==
- List of Czech writers
