= Journey to the Beginning of Time =

1955 Czechoslovak film

- Theatrical release poster
- Directed by: Karel Zeman
- Written by: J.A. Novotný; Karel Zeman
- Produced by: William Cayton
- Starring: Josef Lukáš; Petr Herrmann; Zdeněk Husták; Vladimír Bejval
- Cinematography: Antonín Horak; Václav Pazdernik
- Edited by: Zdenek Stehlik
- Music by: E.F. Burian
- Production company: Filmové Studio Gottwaldov
- Distributed by: Ceskoslovenský Státní Film
- Release date: August 5, 1955
- Running time: 93 minutes (Czechoslovak cut); 84 minutes (American cut)
- Country: Czechoslovakia
- Language: Czech
- Budget: 2 million KČs

Journey to the Beginning of Time (Czech: Cesta do pravěku, literally "Journey into prehistory") is a 1955 Czechoslovak science fiction adventure directed by Karel Zeman, produced in colour using a combination of 2-D and 3-D models. It was the first of Zeman's productions to include actors in conjunction with stop-motion and special effects. It won awards at the International Film Festivals of Venice and Mannheim. In 1966, Cesta do pravěku was dubbed into English, creating a modified US version, Journey to the Beginning of Time.

== Plot ==
The story involves four teenagers: Petr, the main narrator (Josef Lukáš); Toník, who also narrates (Petr Herrmann); Jenda (Zdeněk Husták); and Jirka (Vladimír Bejval). The teens want to find a living trilobite. During a break from school, they undertake a journey in a rowing boat on a "river of time" that flows through a mysterious cave, emerging on a strange, primeval landscape. As they make their way upstream, they realize that they are travelling progressively farther back in time. On their journey, the boys face various perils and learn about prehistoric life.

=== Comparison to other works ===
The plot is somewhat similar to that of the novel Plutonia (1915) by the Russian palaeontologist Vladimir Obruchev, in which a team of Russian explorers enter the Earth's crust via an Arctic portal (a huge depression in the Earth surface created many millions of years previously by the impact of a giant asteroid, into which prehistoric animals had entered), and follow a river that leads them through a sequence of past geological eras and associated animal life. Some scenes in Cesta do pravěku also recall Arthur Conan Doyle's 1912 novel The Lost World, with four male protagonists exploring a prehistoric world where they find evidence of native human habitation, are attacked by a group of enraged pterosaurs, witness a twilight fight between a carnivorous dinosaur and a herbivorous one, encounter a stegosaurus up close, and see one of their members, Petr, nearly chased down by a phorusrhacos. There is also a scene where the stegosaurus battles a ceratosaurus, which is reminiscent of the Rite of Spring sequence from Fantasia.

== Production ==
Zeman's use of unorthodox and seamless production techniques ensured that the film was free of jerky stop-motion sequences and grainy splicing of stop-motion with real-time footage that characterised Hollywood's animated films until the advent of computer-generated imagery. Filming took place on the Morava River near Bzenec Town in the Czech Republic at the nature reserve named (in Czech) Osypané břehy, the Slovak river Váh (near Galanta) and on studio sets.

Zeman was heavily influenced by the palaeo-art of the celebrated Czech artist Zdeněk Burian (1905-1981), and much of the film's imagery was inspired by Burian reconstructions that had been painted under the guidance of Czech palaeontologist Josef Augusta (1903-1968). In some scenes, 2-D 'profile' images of animals originally depicted by Burian were filmed in real time (as in the Styracosaurus sequences), whilst other well-known Burian scenes were recreated in stop-motion using a combination of 2-D and 3-D models (as in the Deinotherium and Uintatherium sequences). Possibly for the sake of continuity, Zeman also used models or 2-D profiles when depicting extant species including bison, a python, flamingoes, vultures, various antelopes, giraffes, and a jaguar (which was briefly spliced with footage of a real animal in one of only three instances of live species footage). In some scenes, miniature models of the actors and their boat/raft were also animated.

In addition to numerous miniature animal models and 2-D 'profiles', Zeman also used larger models of heads and bodies of animals (including a full-sized 'dead' Stegosaurus and swimming woolly rhinoceros, Brontosaurus and Trachodon models), as well as life-sized model plants (as in the Carboniferous forest sequence, and the encounter with the Styracosaurus). The use of 2-D profiles and 3-D models animated by concealed means had the advantage of filming in real time without the need for labour-intensive stop-motion. Two of the film's prehistoric species were not based on Burian images; the Stegosaurus and the Ceratosaurus with which it fights in a twilight scene (it remains unclear as to why Zeman did not use Burian images in these instances).

Cesta do pravěku was made on what would be considered a small budget by Western film-makers. It discussed the various time epochs as defined by palaeontologists and the types of animals typical of those periods, using information known in the 1950s. Whilst many animated feature films, particularly those in the U.S., used models of prehistoric animals in contrived sequences, Zeman instead depicted animals acting naturally in their own environments as if being filmed for a documentary, with the actors observing from the relative safety of the river. Such a philosophy was unusual at the time and was more typical of later TV productions that depicted prehistoric animals in an educational context (including the BBC's Walking with Dinosaurs and Walking with Beasts series) which became popular following the advent of computer-generated imagery that negated the need for time-consuming, highly skilled manual animation. The original release of Zeman's film was 93 minutes, although the East German release had a slightly shorter running time.

=== US version ===
In 1966, another version of the film was released in the U.S. by William Cayton whose company had been marketing Russian animated cartoons and feature films from the 1940s and 1950s, especially those of the famous Soyuzmultfilm studios (well known titles included The Firebird, The Frog Prince, Beauty & the Beast, The Space Explorers, and The Twelve Months). The films were dubbed, sometimes re-titled, partitioned into chapters and distributed to U.S. TV stations. In the case of Cesta do pravěku, Cayton replaced the opening and closing scenes of the original with new footage of American boys who entered the film in a dream sequence whilst visiting the American Museum of Natural History in New York. The film was copied to poor quality film stock and edited into short segments (about six minutes each) for presentation as a serial, syndicated to various children's television programs. The U.S. version was released on VHS video by GoodTimes Entertainment in 1994. Because of the new sequences, none of the actors' faces could be shown until the original footage began.

== Distribution ==
Several scenes of the film were used by the British ABC Weekend TV in the 1961 television serial Pathfinders to Venus. The scenes were that of the Pteranodons flying overhead and the battle between the Ceratosaurus and the Stegosaurus.

GoodTimes Home Video released the US version of the film on VHS in 1994

In 2004, a DVD version of the film appeared in Japan, in Germany in 2005, and Spain in 2007. The Japanese and Spanish versions had different digital masters. The first German DVD had no digitally remastered images, but another German version with Czech and German dialogue, and 15 minutes of extras showing some of Zeman's filming techniques, was released in January 2010. This version used some modified sound effects for the dubbing, and the picture quality is below that of the original. The announced DVD of the original was held back for licence-juridical reasons and it remained unavailable commercially (as of April 2011) although copies of the original circulate amongst enthusiasts.

== Reception ==
The film is, according to server Kinobox.cz, the best Czech science fiction film of all time. The film found success abroad, especially in East Germany, the United States, and Japan. In New York City alone, it was screened in 96 cinemas. No Czech movie has managed to do this before or since. Steven Spielberg said that the film was of high quality for its time. In his film Jurassic Park, we can also see a very similar scene where examining the sick dinosaur was intended to get protagonists as close as possible to the reptile.

In April 2001, Cesta do pravěku was screened at the Brooklyn Academy of Music in Brooklyn, New York, as part of the retrospective entitled The Fabulous World of Karel Zeman. In 2010, it featured at the 50th Zlín Film Festival (May 30 – June 6) in the Czech Republic, one day of which (June 4) was dedicated to Karel Zeman to honor the centenary of his birth. In February 2020, The Criterion Collection included the film as part of their Three Fantastic Journeys by Karel Zeman box set.

== See also ==
- List of films featuring dinosaurs
- List of stop-motion films
