= Velichov =

- Municipality
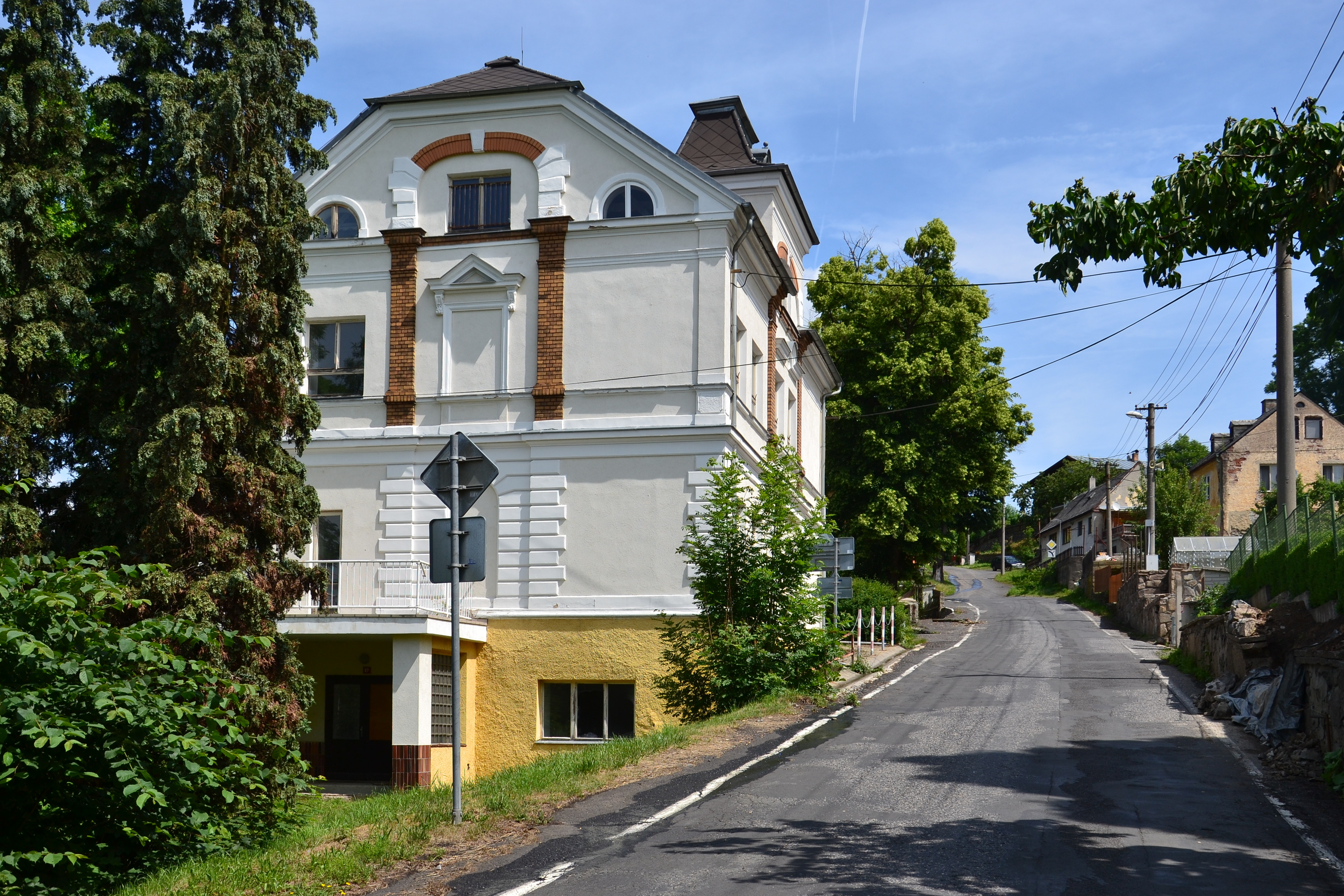
- A street in Velichov

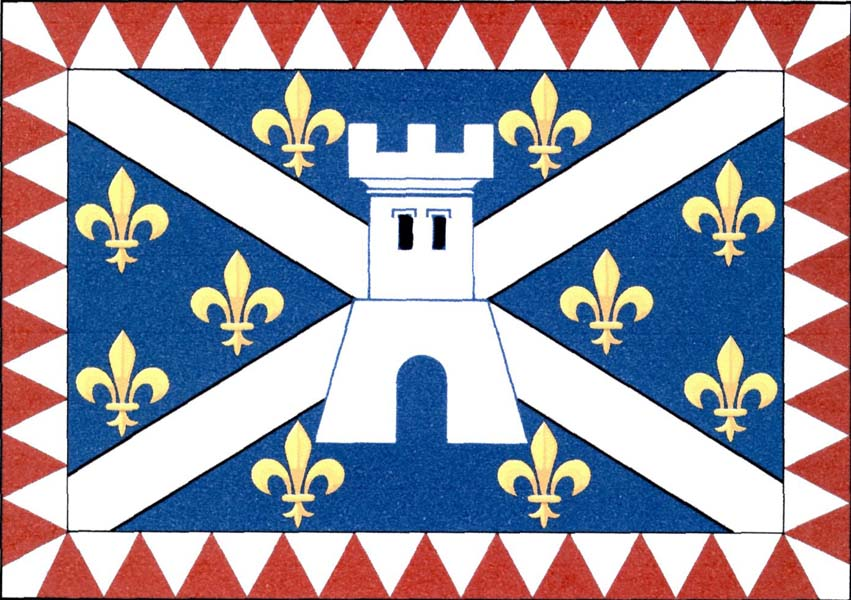
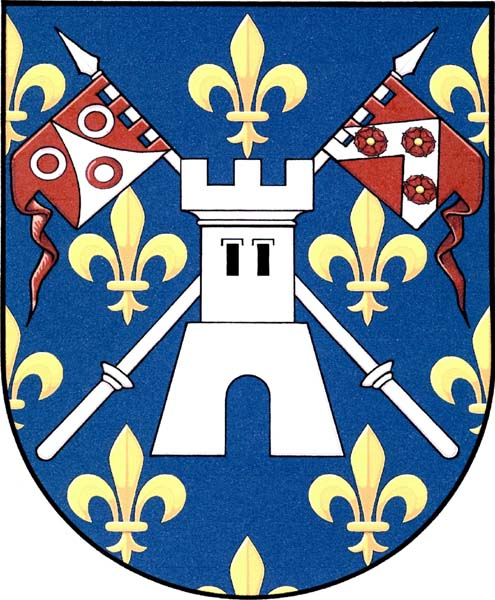
- Flag Coat of arms

- Location in the Czech Republic
- Coordinates: 50°17′3″N 13°0′35″E
- Country: Czech Republic
- Region: Karlovy Vary
- District: Karlovy Vary
- First mentioned: 1142

Area
  - Total: 2.35 km^{2} (0.91 sq mi)
- Elevation: 348 m (1,142 ft)

Population (2026-01-01)
  - Total: 499
  - Density: 212/km^{2} (550/sq mi)
- Time zone: UTC+1 (CET)
  - Summer (DST): UTC+2 (CEST)
- Postal code: 363 01
- Website: www.velichov.cz

Velichov (German: Welchau) is a municipality and village in Karlovy Vary District in the Karlovy Vary Region of the Czech Republic. It has about 500 inhabitants.

== Demographics ==
Historical population
Year	Pop.	±%
1869	490	—
1880	522	+6.5%
1890	534	+2.3%
1900	558	+4.5%
1910	651	+16.7%
1921	655	+0.6%
1930	751	+14.7%
1950	398	−47.0%
1961	457	+14.8%
1970	509	+11.4%
1980	524	+2.9%
1991	487	−7.1%
2001	492	+1.0%
2011	469	−4.7%
2021	477	+1.7%
Source: Censuses

== Notable people ==
- Bedřich Diviš Weber (1766–1842), composer and musicologist
