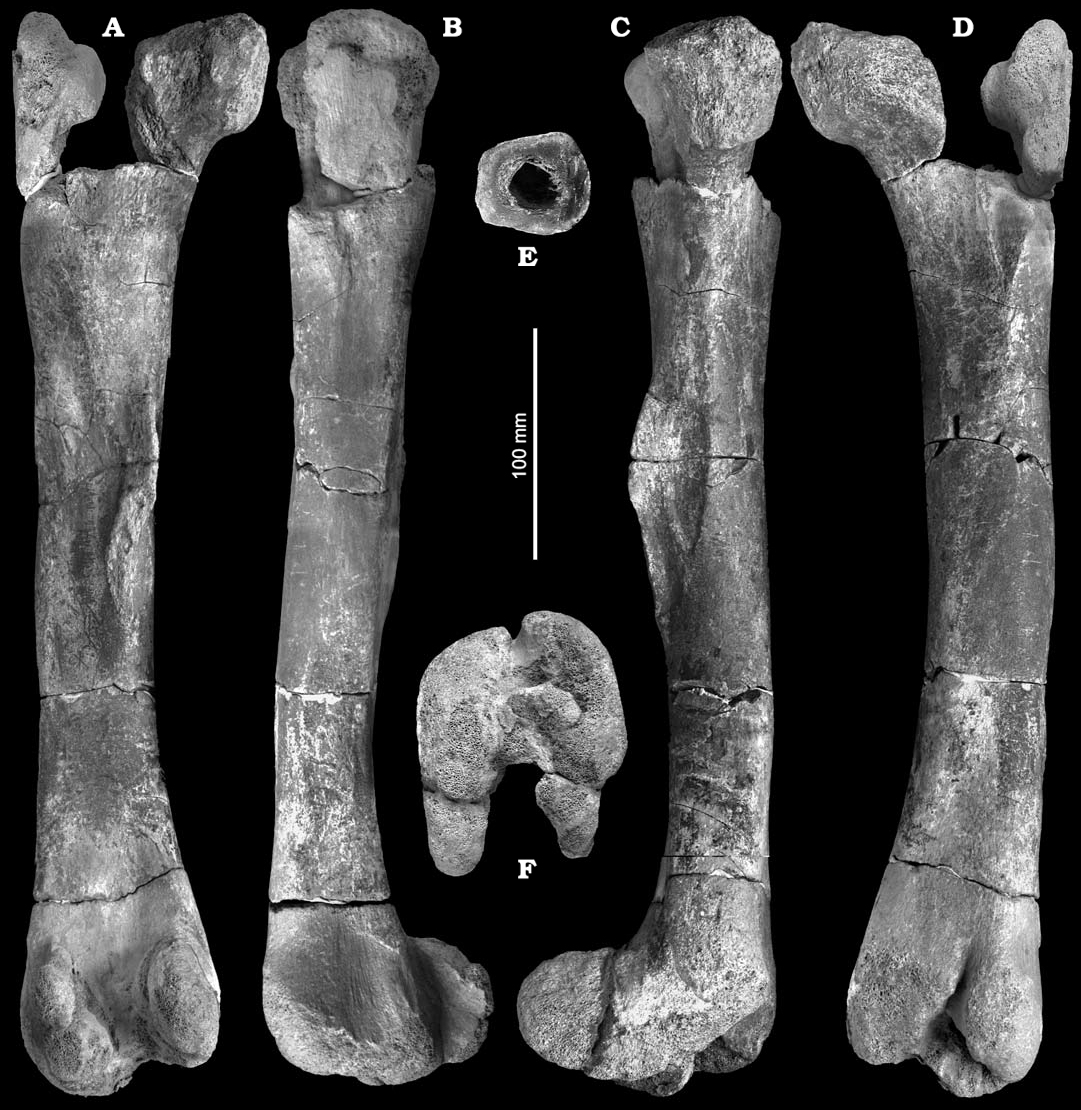
- Holotype femur

Scientific classification
- Kingdom: Animalia
- Phylum: Chordata
- Class: Reptilia
- Clade: Dinosauria
- Clade: †Ornithischia
- Clade: †Ornithopoda
- Genus: †Burianosaurus; Madzia et al., 2017

Type species
- †Burianosaurus augustai Madzia et al., 2017

= Burianosaurus =

Burianosaurus Temporal range: Late Cretaceous, Cenomanian

Extinct genus of dinosaurs

Burianosaurus is an extinct genus of ornithopod dinosaur that lived during the Cenomanian stage of the Late Cretaceous period in what is now the Czech Republic, being the first validly named dinosaur from that country. The type species, B. augustai, was named in 2017; the genus name honours the Czech palaeoartist Zdeněk Burian, and the species name honours the Czech palaeontologist Josef Augusta. The holotype specimen is a femur discovered in sediments belonging to the Peruc-Korycany Formation in 2003, which was described as possibly belonging to an iguanodont in 2005.

== Classification ==
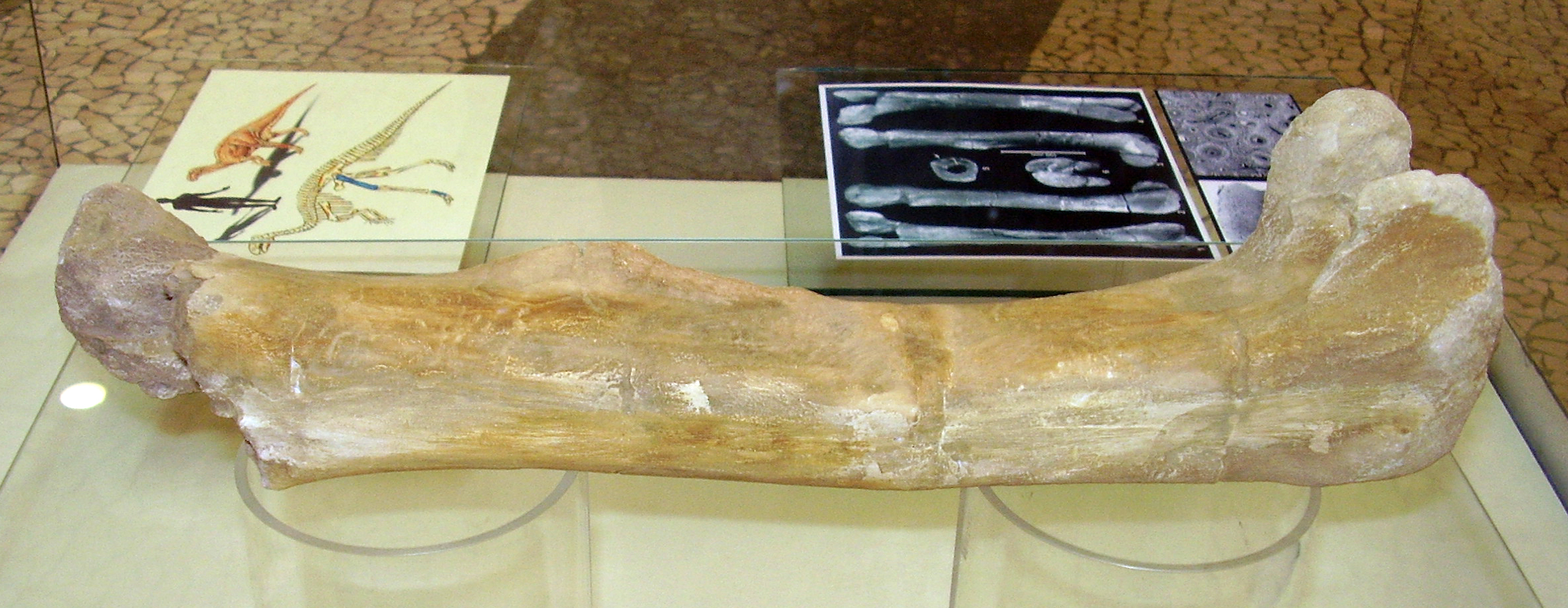
Femur on exhibit in Prague

When the fossil was first described in 2005, it was said to be most morphologically similar to Early Cretaceous members of Iguanodontidae, as opposed to later taxa such as Rhabdodon. Madzia et al. (2017), the study which named the genus, ran two phylogenetic analyses to test the relationships of the taxon. The first, based on the matrix of MacDonald et al. (2012), found it within the clade Rhabdodontomorpha, with support very strong for it being outside of Ankylopollexia. The analysis based on the Boyd et al. (2015) matrix, which they considered more strongly supported, due to better taxon sampling of basal ornithopods and neornithischians, found it to be one of the most basal ornithopods, sister to the clade Iguanodontia. Their cladogram is reproduced below:

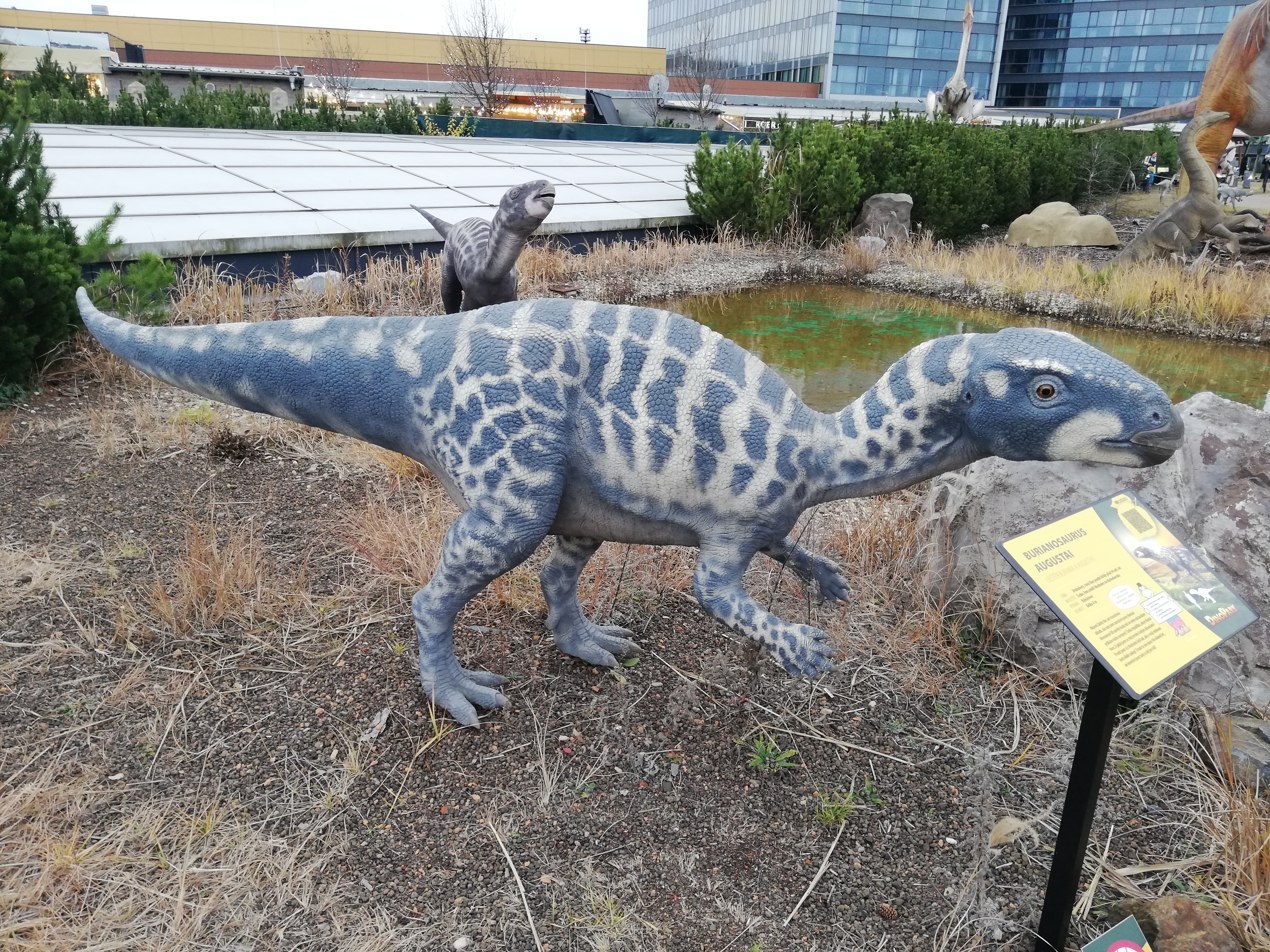
Models

- Clypeodonta
  - Hypsilophodon
  - Cerapoda
    - Marginocephalia
    - Ornithopoda
      - Gideonmantellia
      - - Elasmaria
        - - Burianosaurus
          - Iguanodontia
            - Rhabdodontomorpha
              - Muttaburrasaurus
              - Rhabdodontidae
            - - Tenontosaurus
              - Dryomorpha
                - Dryosauridae
                - Ankylopollexia
                  - Camptosaurus
                  - - Iguanodon
                    - Ouranosaurus

== See also ==
- 2017 in archosaur paleontology
