= Hořín =

- Municipality
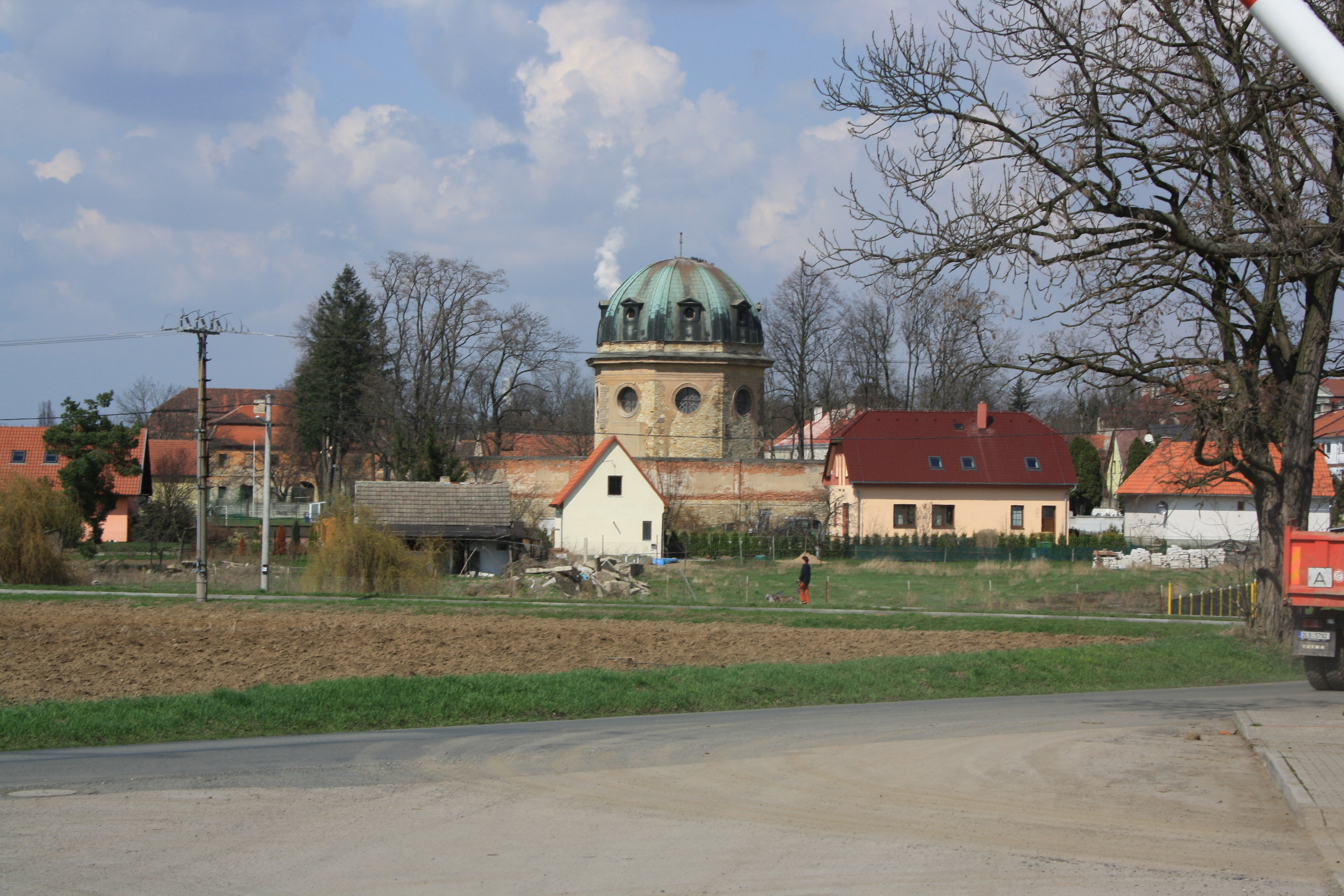
- View from the south

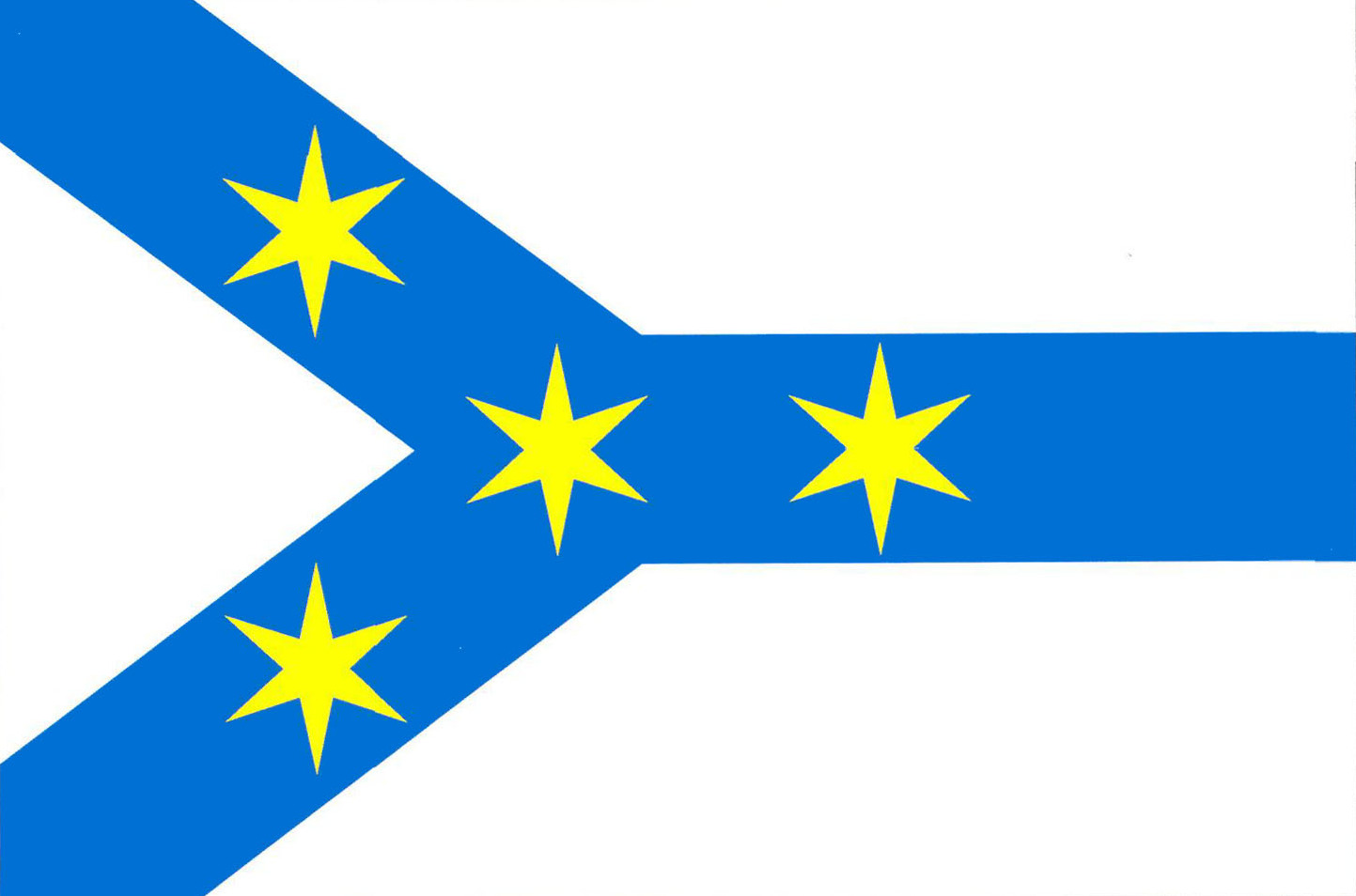
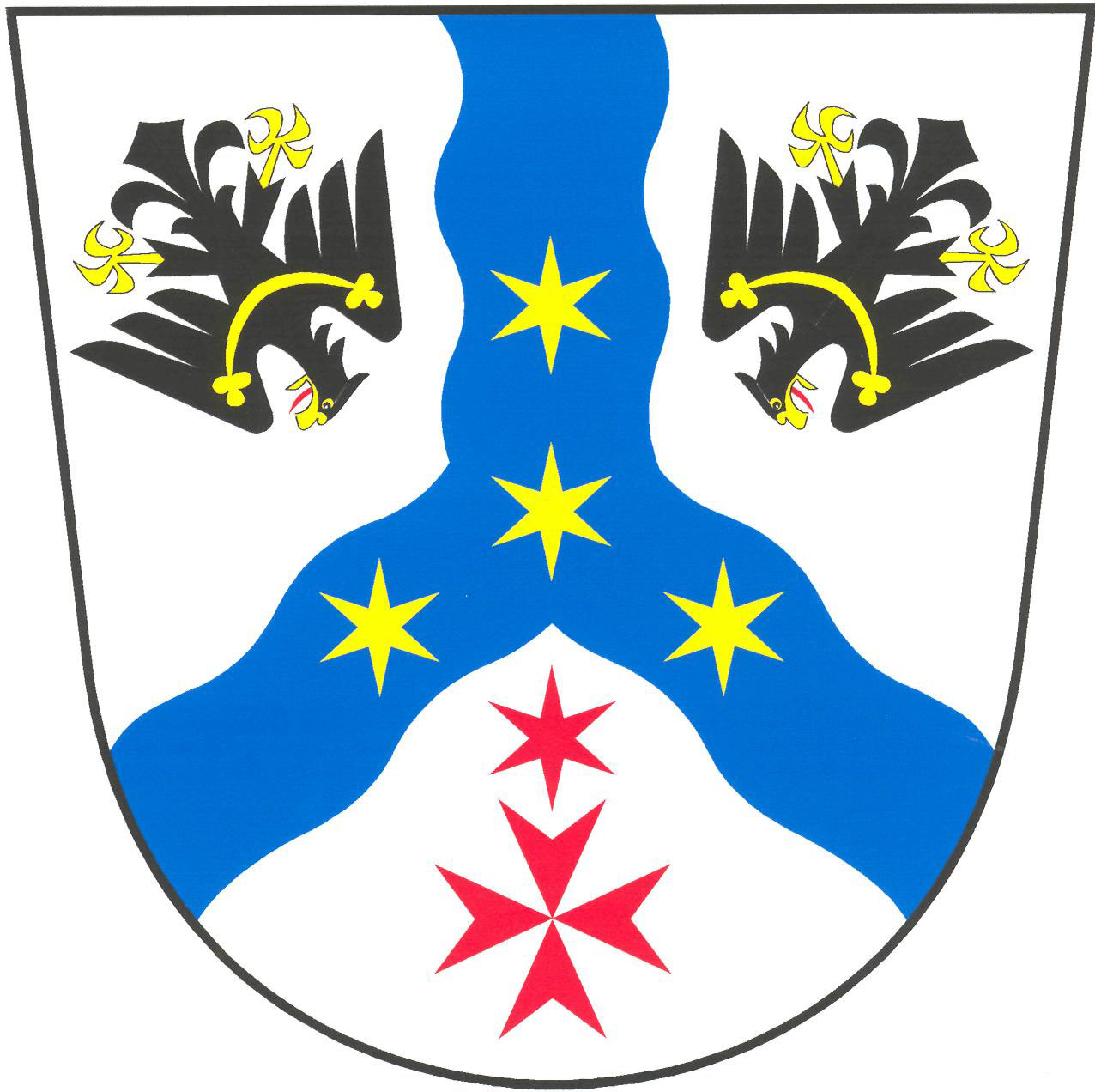
- Flag Coat of arms

- Location in the Czech Republic
- Coordinates: 50°20′42″N 14°27′51″E
- Country: Czech Republic
- Region: Central Bohemian
- District: Mělník
- First mentioned: 1319

Area
  - Total: 14.41 km^{2} (5.56 sq mi)
- Elevation: 161 m (528 ft)

Population (2026-01-01)
  - Total: 939
  - Density: 65.2/km^{2} (169/sq mi)
- Time zone: UTC+1 (CET)
  - Summer (DST): UTC+2 (CEST)
- Postal code: 276 01
- Website: www.obechorin.cz

Hořín (German: Horschin) is a municipality and village in Mělník District in the Central Bohemian Region of the Czech Republic. It has about 900 inhabitants. It lies at the confluence of the Elbe and Vltava rivers.

== Administrative division ==
Hořín consists of four municipal parts (in brackets population according to the 2021 census):

- Hořín (431)
- Brozánky (311)
- Vrbno (126)
- Zelčín (21)

== Etymology ==
The name is derived from the surname Hora, meaning "Hora's (court)".

== Geography ==
Hořín is located about 1 kilometre (1 mi) west of Mělník and 25 km (16 mi) north of Prague. It lies in a flat landscape in the Central Elbe Table. The municipality is situated at the confluence of the Elbe and Vltava rivers, on the left bank of the Elbe. The Vraňany–Hořín Shipping Channel also flows through the territory.

== History ==
The first written mention of Hořín is from 1319. There used to be a fortress, which was destroyed during the Hussite Wars. From the 16th century, Hořín served as an important economic background for the Mělník estate.

The village of Hořín was badly damaged during the 2002 European floods and has been protected by a flood wall since then.

== Demographics ==
Historical population

Year	Pop.	±%
1869	1,187	—
1880	1,318	+11.0%
1890	1,303	−1.1%
1900	1,194	−8.4%
1910	1,327	+11.1%

Year	Pop.	±%
1921	1,258	−5.2%
1930	1,239	−1.5%
1950	1,057	−14.7%
1961	975	−7.8%
1970	1,051	+7.8%

Year	Pop.	±%
1980	933	−11.2%
1991	762	−18.3%
2001	744	−2.4%
2011	734	−1.3%
2021	889	+21.1%

Source: Censuses

== Transport ==
The I/16 road, which connects the D8 motorway with Mělník, runs through the municipality.

== Sights ==
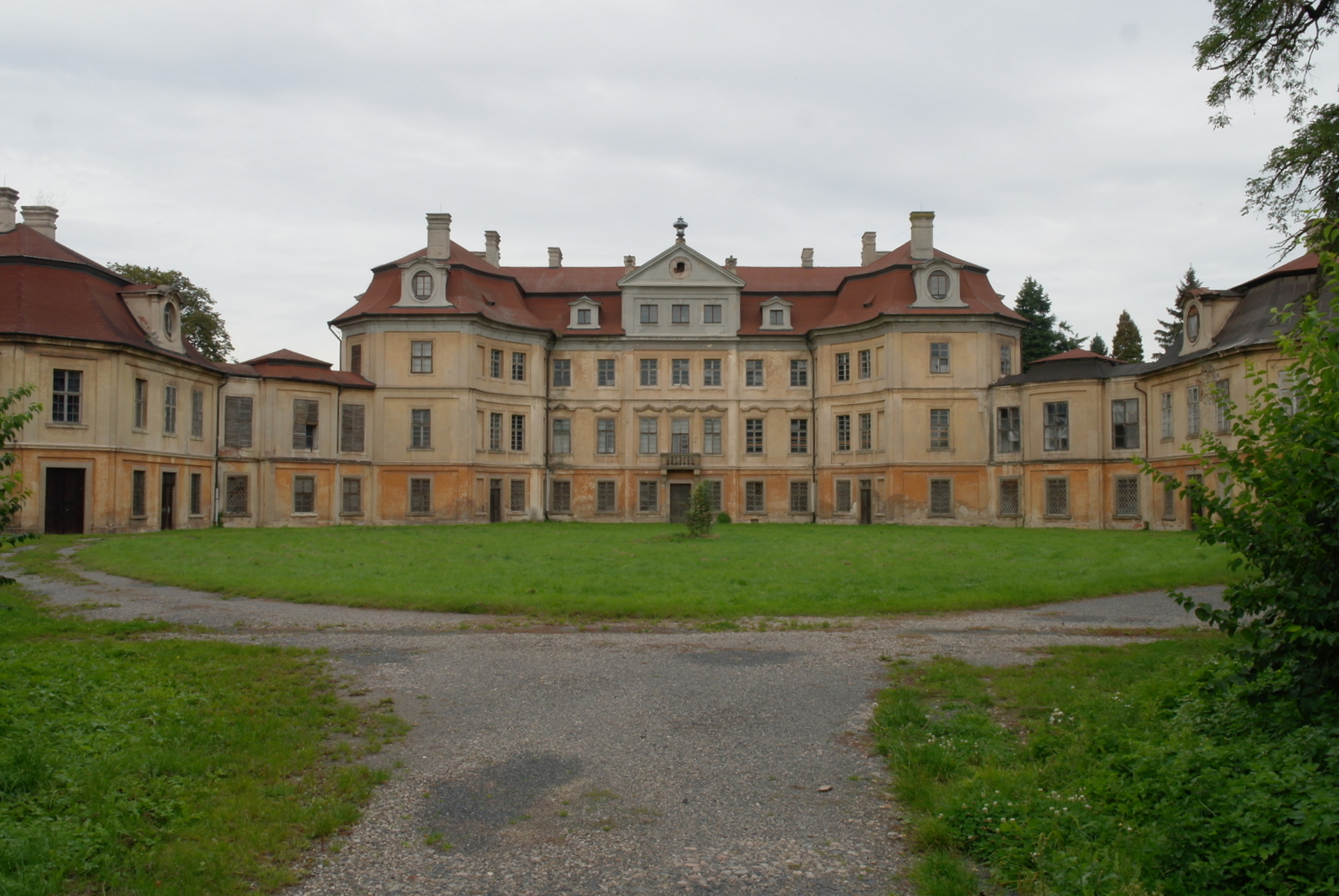
Hořín Castle

The main landmarks of Hořín are the church and the castle. The Church of Saint Nicholas was built in the late Baroque style in second half of the 18th century. It includes a valuable Baroque mortuary.

The Baroque castle in Hořín dates was built for the Czernin family around 1696, then it was rebuilt by František Maxmilián Kaňka in 1713–1720. Another modifications took place in 1736–1746. The interior contains valuable Rococo decoration. Today the castle is owned by the Lobkowicz family, and is abandoned and unused. Next to the castle in an extensive park. On the local cemetery is the burial vault of the Lobkowicz family.

On the Vraňany–Hořín Shipping Channel is a lock from 1905, which is protected as a technical monument.

The historic centre of the village of Vrbno is protected as a village monument zone. There is a set of well-preserved agricultural homesteads. The main landmark of the village is the Church of the Exaltation of the Holy Cross, buitl in the Romanesque style.

In Zelčín is a zoopark that claims that it is "the largest contact zoo in Bohemia."

== Notable people ==
- Jan August Vitásek (1770–1839), composer
- Denis Višinský (born 2003), footballer
