= Eduard Štorch =

Czech pedagogue, archaeologist and writer

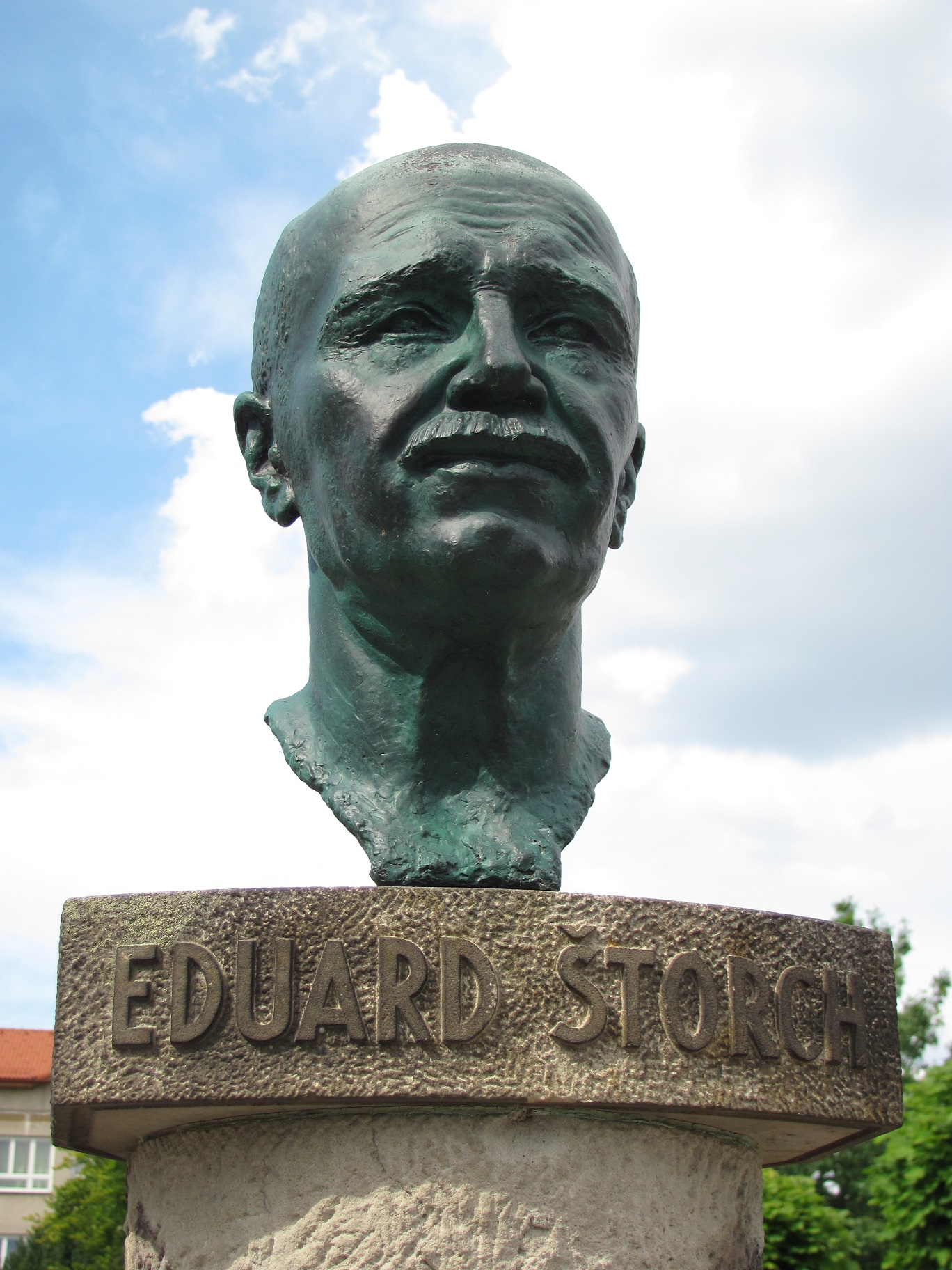
Bust of Eduard Štorch in his native Ostroměř

Eduard Štorch (10 April 1878 – 25 June 1956) was a Czech pedagogue, archaeologist and writer, known for novels set in prehistoric Bohemia during Stone and Bronze Age.

== Biography ==
Štorch was born on 10 April 1878 in Ostroměř. He studied at the gymnasium and the pedagogic institute in Hradec Králové. Štorch worked as a teacher in several location in northern and eastern Bohemia and since 1903 in Prague, during 1919–1921 as a school inspector in Bratislava and then, until his retirement in 1938, again as a teacher in Prague.

Among Štorch's activities were archeology, ethnography, biology, journalism and reform of education system. In 1935, together with Karel Čondl, Štorch wrote a three volumes textbook of history for secondary schools. The textbook was attacked by Catholic church because it documented attempts of the church to obtain political power throughout the history.

Štorch published several scholar works, many novels for the youth and countless number of articles in journals and newspapers. The novels were based on and limited by scientific knowledge of the time. His most famous novel is "Mammoth Hunters" (1918, Lovci mamutů) set 30,000–20,000 years ago among people of Gravettian culture. Several of the books were illustrated by Zdeněk Burian. Three novels were filmed: Osada havranů (1977, international title: Settlement of Crows), Na veliké řece (1977), Volání rodu (1978), all directed by Jan Schmidt.

Štorch died on 25 June 1956 in Prague, at the age of 78.

== Scholar works ==
- Člověk diluviální (Diluvial man, 1907), targeted to the youth,
- Vznik vlastnictví (Birth of proprietorship, 1907),
- Počátky života pozemského (Beginnings of life on Earth, 1908),
- První lidé v Čechách (First people in Bohemia, 1909),
- Původ náboženství (Origin of religion, 1909),
- Praha v době kamenné (Prague during Stone Age, 1910),
- Vývoj tvorstva a vznik člověka (Development of life and origin of the humankind, 1912),
- Život v pravěku (Prehistoric life, 1912),
- Praha v pravěku (Prehistoric Prague, 1916),
- Praha v době prehistorické (Prague in prehistoric times, 1921).

== Novels ==
- Čarodějův učedník (Sorcerer's Apprentice, 1910), set in Bronze Age;
- Bohatýr Vratislav (Vratislav, The Hero, 1917), heroic stories from ancient times;
- Lovci mamutů (Mammoth Hunters, 1918), depicts life of Paleolithic hunters. This is the most popular work by Eduard Štorch.
- Libuše a Přemysl (Libuše and Přemysl, 1919), from Czech mythology;
- V šeru dávných věků (From the Dark of Ancient Times, 1920), four stories set in Bronze Age;
- Osada havranů (Settlement of Ravens, 1930), story about settled Paleolithic group located on Kunratický brook near Prague;
- Bronzový poklad (The Bronze Treasure, 1931), inspired by discovery of bronze needles near Sedlčany;
- U veliké řeky (At the Great River, 1932), life in Prague basin 5,000 years ago, the river is Vltava;
- Zlomený meč (Broken Sword, 1932), about the war between Marcomanni tribes led by king Marbod (Marobud) and the Roman Empire;
- Junáckou stezkou (On Trail of Heroes, 1934), an Iron Age story;
- Hrdina Nik (Hero Nik, 1934), romance story from the time of Samo's Realm, during incursion of Avars, finalling with Battle of Wogastisburg;
- Volání rodu (Call of the Tribe, 1934), story of Forefather Čech;
- O Děvín a Velehrad (About Děvín and Velehrad, 1939), set in Great Moravia;
- Zastavený příval (The Storm Stopped, 1940), about failed incursion from Frankish Empire in 805;
- Meč proti meči (Sword Against Sword, 1946), stories from the early periods of Czech statehood and decline of Polabian Slavs;
- Statečné mládí (The Brave Youth, 1946), stories of youth in prehistoric times;
- Minehava (Minehava, 1950), novel set in period of transition from matriarchy to patriarchy.
