= Bedřich Diviš Weber =

Czech music educator and composer (1766–1842)

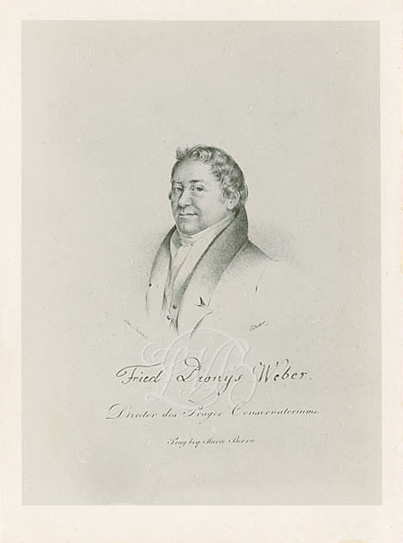
Weber portrayed by Josef Eduard Teltscher

Bedřich Diviš Weber (German: Friedrich Dionys Weber; 9 October 1766 – 25 December 1842) was a Czech composer and musicologist. He is primarily remembered as the first director of the Prague Conservatory, in whose foundation he played a leading role.

== Life ==
Weber was born on 9 October 1766 in Velichov, Bohemia. He studied philosophy and law in Prague before turning his attention definitively to music, studying under Abbe Vogler. He became an advocate for the music of Mozart after meeting him in Prague, and his compositions bear evidence of this influence, being firmly rooted in that stylistic period. He was antagonistic towards the work of Beethoven and Carl Maria von Weber (no relation), although an enthusiast for the work of Richard Wagner. In 1832 he conducted the first performance of Wagner's Symphony in C major, a student performance at the Prague Conservatory.

As director of both the conservatory and the Prague Organ School, he effectively controlled higher musical education in the region, so was arguably the most influential figure in the music of Prague at that time. He also wrote several music theory textbooks considered important in their time.

Despite his conservative style, he was happy to explore the possibilities of new instruments, such as his Variationen für das neu erfundene Klappenhorn (Variations for the newly invented keyed bugle). He was a skilled writer for brass instruments and had a particular interest in new developments; he was himself responsible for a form of chromatic horn.

His best-known surviving work is probably the cantata Böhmens Errettung. He also composed an opera, König der Genien, in 1800, and his Variations for Trumpet and Orchestra followed his own experiments with keyed instruments, particularly his keyed horn.

In 1823–1824, he was one of the 50 composers who composed a variation on a waltz by Anton Diabelli for Vaterländischer Künstlerverein.

One of his students, Joseph Kail, introduced the keyed horn to Vienna and went on to develop the double piston Vienna valve horn. It is reported that in 1828 a certain Herr Chlum played the Variations for Trumpet and Orchestra on a chromatic trumpet of Kail's invention, presumably the valve trumpet, making this work the earliest surviving example of such music.

He died on 25 December 1842 in Prague.
