= Jan August Vitásek =

Bohemian composer

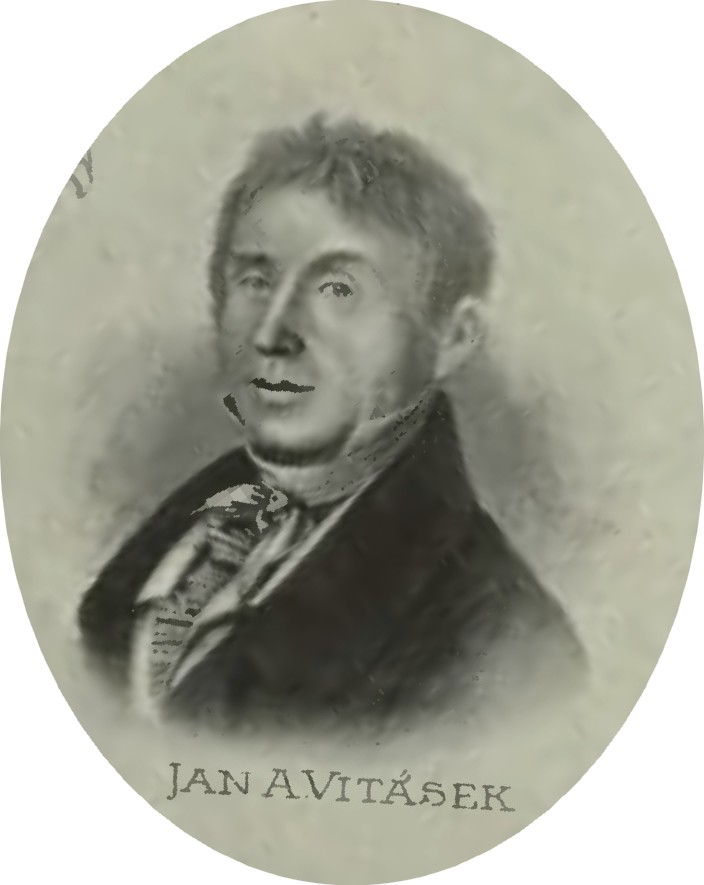
Jan Augustin Vitásek

Jan Matyáš Nepomuk August Vitásek (also Jan Nepomuk Augustin Vitásek, Johann Matthias Wittasek/Wittaschek; February 20, 1770 – December 7, 1839) was a Bohemian composer.

Vitásek was born at Hořín. He studied under his father and then under František Xaver Dušek and Leopold Koželuch, the latter of whom he would succeed in the position of music director in 1814 at the Cathedral of St. Vitus in Prague. Vitásek remained in Prague for the rest of his life and became one of the city's leading musical figures, even refusing an offer of a directorship at St. Stephen's Cathedral, Vienna. He became the director of the organ school for a Bohemian organization called the Society for the Promotion of Church Music in 1830. He died in Prague.

Vitásek's compositional output includes one opera (David, 1810), twelve masses, seven requiems, many other choral works both sacred and secular, some symphonies, concertos, chamber music, and preludes and fugues for organ. In 1823–24, he was one of the 50 composers who composed a variation on a waltz by Anton Diabelli for Vaterländischer Künstlerverein.
