= List of National Geographic cover stories (2020s) =

National Geographic logo

This is a list of National Geographic cover stories including writers and photographers starting from January 2020.

For a complete list of cover stories from 1959 to 2026, see the List of National Geographic cover stories.

== 2020 ==
2020
Title^{a}	Date	Author	Photographer	Images^{b}	Ref
Pain	January 2020	Robert Clark, et al.	Magic Torch	Human brain	
Last Journey into Slavery	February 2020	Joel K. Bourne, Jr., et al.	Kadir Nelson	Slave ship	
The End of Trash	March 2020	Robert Kunzig	Luca Locatelli	Massive pile of clothes	
How We Lost the Planet, How we Saved the World	April 2020	Susan Goldberg	Imaginary Forces	Earth	
You'll Miss Them When There Gone	May 2020	Elizabeth Kolbert	David Liittschwager	Insects	
The Last Voices of World War II	June 2020	Lynne Olson	Robert Clark	Lawrence Brooks	
Everest	July 2020	Mark Synnott	William Faucett	Mount Everest	
Stopping Pandemics	August 2020	Richard Conniff	Max Aguilera-Hellweg	Man in a gas mask	
Meet the Robots	September 2020	David Berreby	Spencer Lowell	Robot hand	
Reimaging Dinosaurs	October 2020	Michael Greshko	Davide Bonadonna	Deinonychus	
A World Gone Viral	November 2020	Multiple authors & stories^{d}	Cédric Gerbehaye	X-ray of human lungs	
Saving the Great Lakes	December 2020	Tim Folger	Keith Ladzinski	Lake Michigan	

== 2021 ==
2021
Title^{a}	Date	Author	Photographer	Images^{b}	Ref
2020: 71 photographs from an Unforgettable year	January 2021	Susan Goldberg	Kris Graves	Robert E. Lee Monument	
Mysteries of a virus	February 2021	David Quammen	Markos Kay	Mimivirus	
Mars	March 2021	Nadia Drake	ESA	Mars	
The fight for Clean Air	April 2021	Beth Gardiner	Matthieu Paley	Power plant in Ulaanbaatar	
Secrets of the Whales	May 2021	Craig Welch	Brian Skerry	Humpback whale	
Reckoning with the Past	June 2021	Cynthia Gorney	Kadir Nelson	Kadir Nelson painting	
Beating the Heat	July 2021	Alejandra Borunda	Elliot Ross	Tree canopy	
Gladiators	August 2021	Andrew Curry	Fernando Baptista	Thraex gladiator	
Mysteries of the Solar System	September 2021	Michael Greshko	Monica Serrano	Patroclus	
The Revolution is Here	October 2021	Craig Welch, et al.	Bose Collins	The future	
100 Wonders of the World	November 2021	Andrew Lawler	Kadir Nelson	Kadir Nelson painting	
Welcome to Earth	December 2021	Paula Kahumbu	Charlie Hamilton James	Egrets & Wildebeests	

== 2022 ==
2022
Title^{a}	Date	Author	Photographer	Images^{b}	Ref
2021 The Year in Pictures^{c}	January 2022	—N/a	Dar Yasin; Brian Skerry; Lynsey Addario; Kiana Hayeri	Health professional	
Notre-Dame	February 2022	Robert Kunzig	Tomas van Houtryve	Notre-Dame de Paris	
Into the Depths	March 2022	Tara Roberts	Wayne Lawrence	shipwrecks	
Exploring Islands in the Sky	April 2022	Mark Synnott	Renan Öztürk	A tepui	
Saving Forests	May 2022	Alejandra Borunda	Keith Ladzinski	Forest	
The Power of Touch	June 2022	Cynthia Gorney	Lynn Johnson	Woman and baby	
We Are Here	July 2022	Charles C. Mann	Kiliii YuYan	Native nations	
Stonehenge Revealed	August 2022	Roff Smith	Reuben Wu	Sunset at Stonehenge	
America the Beautiful	September 2022	Emma Marris	Stephen Wilkes	Bears Ears	
Minds of Their Own	October 2022	Yudhijit Bhattacharjee	Vincent Lagrange	Sphynx cat	
Tuts Treasures	November 2022	Paolo Verzone	Sandro Vannini	Tutankhamun	
Pictures of the Year^{d}	December 2022	—N/a	Arturo Rodríguez	Volcanic eruption	

== 2023 ==
2023
Title^{a}	Date	Author	Photographer	Images^{b}	Ref
Living Longer and Better	January 2023	Fran Smith	Jasper Doest	Older man skydiving	
The Future is Folded	February 2023	Maya Wei-Haas	Craig Cutler	Origami	
Going Home	March 2023	Andrew Curry	Richard Barnes	Bronze Head from Ife	
8 Billion: The Population Paradox	April 2023	Craig Welch	Justin Metz	Earth	
Secrets of the Elephants	May 2023	Srinath Perur	Brent Stirton	Asian elephants	
Into the Wild	June 2023	Peter Guin	Katie Orlinsky	Gila Hot Springs	
Chasing the unknown	July 2023	Multiple authors & stories^{d}	Steven Alvarez	Ellison's Cave	
An Arctic Mystery	August 2023	Mark Synnott	Renan Öztürk	Peel Sound, Canada	
Inside the Dome of the Rock	September 2023	Andrew Lawler	Ziyah Gafić	Dome of the Rock	
Space	October 2023	Multiple authors & stories^{d}	NASA; JPL; SSI	Saturn's moon Enceladus	
The Race to Save the Planet	November 2023	Sam Howe Verhovek	Davide Monteleone	Geodesic dome	
Pictures of the Year	December 2023	Multiple authors^{d}	Kyle Yuman	Yellow-lipped sea krait	

== 2024 ==
2024
Title^{a}	Date	Author	Photographer	Images^{b}	Ref
Saving the Monarchs	January 2024	Michelle Nijhuis	Jaime Rojo	Monarch butterflies	
The Glass Age	February 2024	Jay Bennett	Christopher Payne	Curled Sheet glass	
Spotted Hyenas	March 2024	Christine Dell'Amore	Jen Guyton	Infrared photo of a Spotted hyena and her cub, in Kenya.	
Fabulous Fungi	April 2024	Sarah Gibbens	Agorastos Papatsanis	Mushrooms of Kallipefki, Larissa, Greece	
Secrets of the Octopus	May 2024	Rachel Fobar	David Liittschwager	California two-spot octopus	
Gulf of Maine	June 2024	Brian Skerry	Brian Skerry	Alewives	
Indigenous Futures	July 2024	Kate Nelson	Gabriel Fermin	Features the artwork "Future Ancestral Technologies: New Myth" by multidisciplinary artist Cannupa Hanska Luger (Mandan, Hidatsa, Arikara, Lakota)	

== See also ==
- National Geographic
- National Geographic Society
- List of National Geographic cover stories

== Notes ==
a. In some issues of National Geographic, the cover story would have one title on the cover and a different title (with the same meaning) on the headline of the actual article, or the title may appear different on the table of contents. Titles represented in this list, are taken from the cover and the citation represents the title listed in the table of contents.
b. Images could also be a painting, drawing or a computer rendering.
c. There were four versions of this issue of the magazine, each from a different photographer.
d. Multiple articles with various authors. Photo depicted is not included in those articles.
