= Kunzig =

Kunzig is a surname. Notable people with the surname include:

- Robert Lowe Kunzig (1918–1982), American attorney and judge
- Robert Kunzig, American science journalist
