= Renan Öztürk =

American mountain and rock climber

Renan Öztürk (born April 7, 1980) is an American rock climber, free soloist, mountaineer, visual artist, and filmmaker. He is best known for climbing the Shark's Fin route on his second attempt to Meru Peak in the Himalayas with Jimmy Chin and Conrad Anker in 2011, where he also suffered a minor stroke. The successful 2011 ascent of the Shark's Fin on Meru and a prior attempt in 2008 were detailed in the 2015 documentary film Meru.

== Early life and education ==
Öztürk was born in Germany to an American mother and a Turkish father. His parents divorced when he was one and he moved to Rhode Island with his mother. Öztürk, whose maternal grandparents were Jewish, attended Hebrew school weekly as a child.

Öztürk attended Colby College, then transferred to Colorado College after his sophomore year. He received a degree in biology in 2003.

== Climbing career ==
After college, Öztürk traveled the western United States with other rock climbers, wintering in Indian Creek or Joshua Tree, climbing in Yosemite during the spring and fall, and spending summers in Squamish, British Columbia. In 2004, while working as a rigger on a film team in Indian Creek, Öztürk impulsively decided to free solo North Sixshooter Peak. The crew filmed his ascent and included it in the climbing film, Return 2 Sender.

His first attempt at the Shark's Fin route of Meru Peak took place in 2008 with Anker and Chin. They spent 19 days on the climb but turned back 500 feet short of the summit.

In 2011, Öztürk suffered a near-fatal skiing accident in Jackson, Wyoming, from which he made a dramatic recovery that enabled him to complete the first ascent of the Shark's Fin on Meru Peak with Conrad Anker and Jimmy Chin, that same year.

In 2019, Öztürk accompanied Mark Synnott on an Everest expedition to search for Sandy Irvine's body. Öztürk led a documentary team from National Geographic to film the expedition for a documentary called Lost on Everest.

== Personal life ==
Öztürk paints, often using found materials for his artwork. He is also interested in photography and filmmaking.

== Awards ==
- 2011 Golden Piton Award 'Big Wall'.
- 2013 National Geographic 'Adventurer of the Year'.

== Notable ascents ==
- 2011: First ascent of the Shark’s Fin Route on Meru Peak in the Himalaya.
- 2012: First ascent of The Tooth Traverse (5.10R M5 A2+; 26,200 feet) across the Moose's Tooth Skyline, Denali National Park.
- Free ascent of Freerider 5.12d (7c), on El Capitan.
- First ascent of the SW Cat Ear Spire, Trango Towers, in the Himalaya
- First ascent of The Beholder V, 5.12 (7b/+) on the Eye Tooth, Ruth Gorge, Denali National Park.
- First ascent of the SW Buttress of Tawoche, Khumbu Himalaya.
