= The Secret Token =

2018 book

- Author: Andrew Lawler
- Language: English
- Genre: Non-fiction
- Published: 2018
- Publisher: Doubleday Books
- Publication place: United States

The Secret Token: Myth, Obsession, and the Search for the Lost Colony of Roanoke is a 2018 book by Andrew Lawler about the lost Roanoke Colony in the Outer Banks of North Carolina.

== Synopsis ==
The book covers the history of the Roanoke Colony founded by Sir Walter Ralegh in 1587. After governor John White left the colony to get supplies from England, he returned the colony completely deserted. The mystery of the colony's fate inspired numerous investigations that all failed to uncover the truth. Both the theories surrounding the colony's disappearance and the factors that inspire modern fascination with the subject are explored by the book.

== Reception ==
The book received mostly positive reviews from critics for its broad research and compelling analysis. A review from The Economist stated that "willingness to chase down every lead, no matter how outlandish, and his enthusiasm for the journey as much as the destination, make “The Secret Token” a lively and engaging read." Publishers Weekly and Coastal Review compared the book's structure to a mystery novel. Steve Donoghue of Open Letters Monthly, wrote that the book's "careful grounding and broadening makes Lawler's the best account of Roanoke to appear in many years."

Gregory S. Schneider, writing for The Washington Post, wrote that "the themes of mingled races, of cultures clashing to create something new, are surprisingly fresh and powerful. The issues raised by the Lost Colony are still playing out. It’s a mystery in which all Americans have a stake."

Michael Leroy Oberg of Journal of Southern history, gave the book a mostly positive review but noted that "Lawler often becomes so enamored with the colorful characters in the Roanoke drama that he overlooks important matters of context. Those English colonists settled on Native ground, and it was Indians, more than anyone else, who determined the colony’s fate. Lawler sometimes seems to lose track of the forest for several of his story’s very interesting trees."
