= Bridger Jack Butte =

Rock formation in San Juan County, Utah, United States

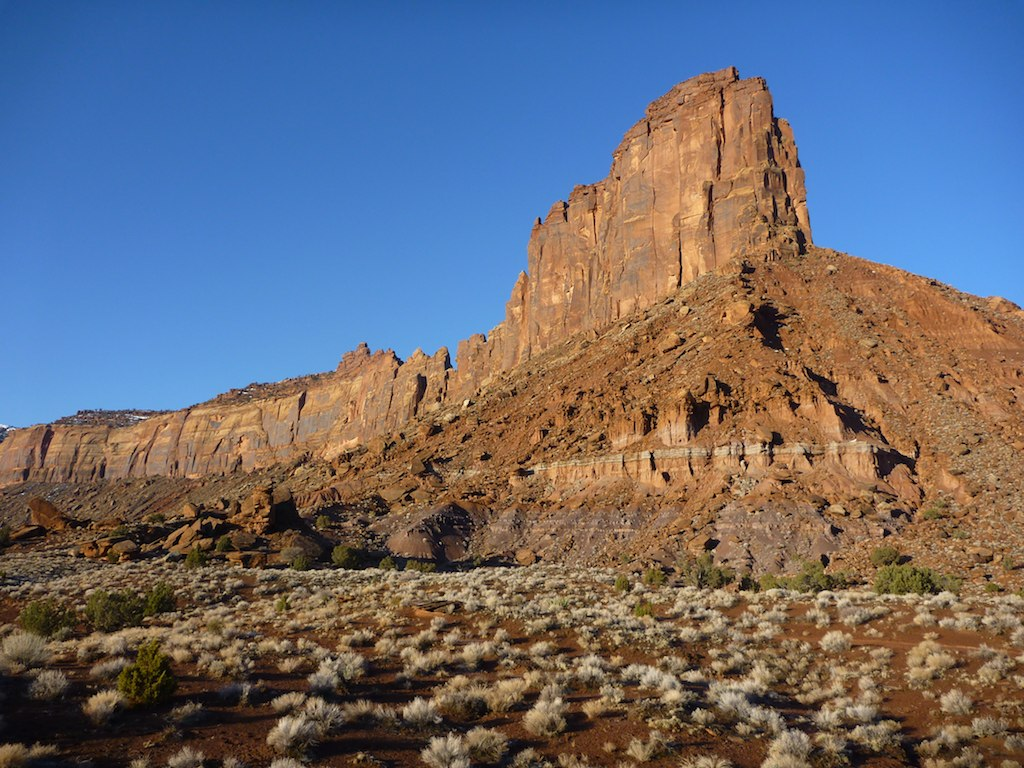
- Bridger Jack Butte, northeast aspect

Highest point
- Elevation: 6,196 ft (1,889 m)
- Prominence: 322 ft (98 m)
- Parent peak: Cotton Benchmark (6,747 ft)
- Isolation: 1.62 mi (2.61 km)
- Coordinates: 38°05′18″N 109°36′02″W

Geography
- Location within Utah Location within the United States
- Country: United States
- State: Utah
- County: San Juan
- Protected area: Bears Ears National Monument
- Parent range: Colorado Plateau
- Topo map: USGS Harts Point South

Geology
- Rock age: Late Triassic
- Rock type: Wingate Sandstone

Climbing
- First ascent: 1983
- Easiest route: Wild Flower class 5.10+ climbing

Bridger Jack Butte is a sandstone butte located in Bears Ears National Monument, in San Juan County, Utah, United States. Set at the northern tip of Bridger Jack Mesa and above the confluence of Indian and Lavender Creeks, the summit rises to an elevation of 6,196 feet (1,889 meters), and towers over 700 feet (210 meters) above the surrounding terrain and floor of Lavender Canyon to its west. This landmark is situated four miles southeast of the Sixshooter Peaks, and is visible from State Route 211 between Newspaper Rock and the Needles District of Canyonlands National Park. "Bridger Jack" was a Paiute medicine man.

== Geology ==
Bridger Jack Butte is composed of hard, fine-grained Wingate Sandstone, the petrified remains of wind-borne sand dunes deposited approximately 200 million years ago in the Late Triassic. This Wingate Sandstone forms steep cliffs as it overlays softer layers of the Chinle Formation. The next layer below this is the Moenkopi Formation. Precipitation runoff drains into nearby Indian Creek, which is part of the Colorado River drainage basin.

== Climbing ==
Bridger Jack Butte is set in the popular Indian Creek climbing area. The first ascent of Bridger Jack Butte was made June 12, 1983, by Ed Webster, Leonard Coyne, and Ellen Figi, via the Wild Flower route. The "Bridger Jacks" are towers on the connecting ridge between the mesa and the butte. They have names such as "King of Pain", "Hummingbird Spire", "Sunflower Tower", "Easter Island", and "Thumbelina".

Climbing routes on Bridger Jack Butte:

- Wild Flower – class 5.10a (3 pitches)
- Sparkling Touch – class 5.11
- The Kokanee Corner – class 5.13+
- Hydrophobic coyote – class 5.10-
- Rites of Passage – class 5.11+

== Climate ==
Spring and fall are the most favorable seasons to visit Bridger Jack Butte. According to the Köppen climate classification system, it is located in a cold semi-arid climate zone, which is defined by the coldest month having an average mean temperature below 32 °F (0 °C), and at least 50% of the total annual precipitation being received during the spring and summer. This desert climate receives less than 10 inches (250 millimeters) of annual rainfall, and snowfall is generally light and transient during the winter.

== Gallery ==
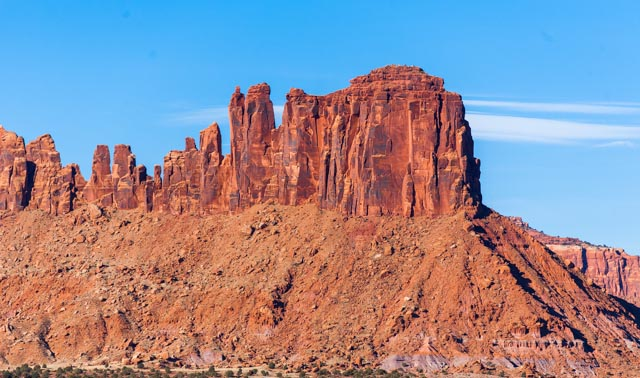
Bridger Jacks and Butte, from east

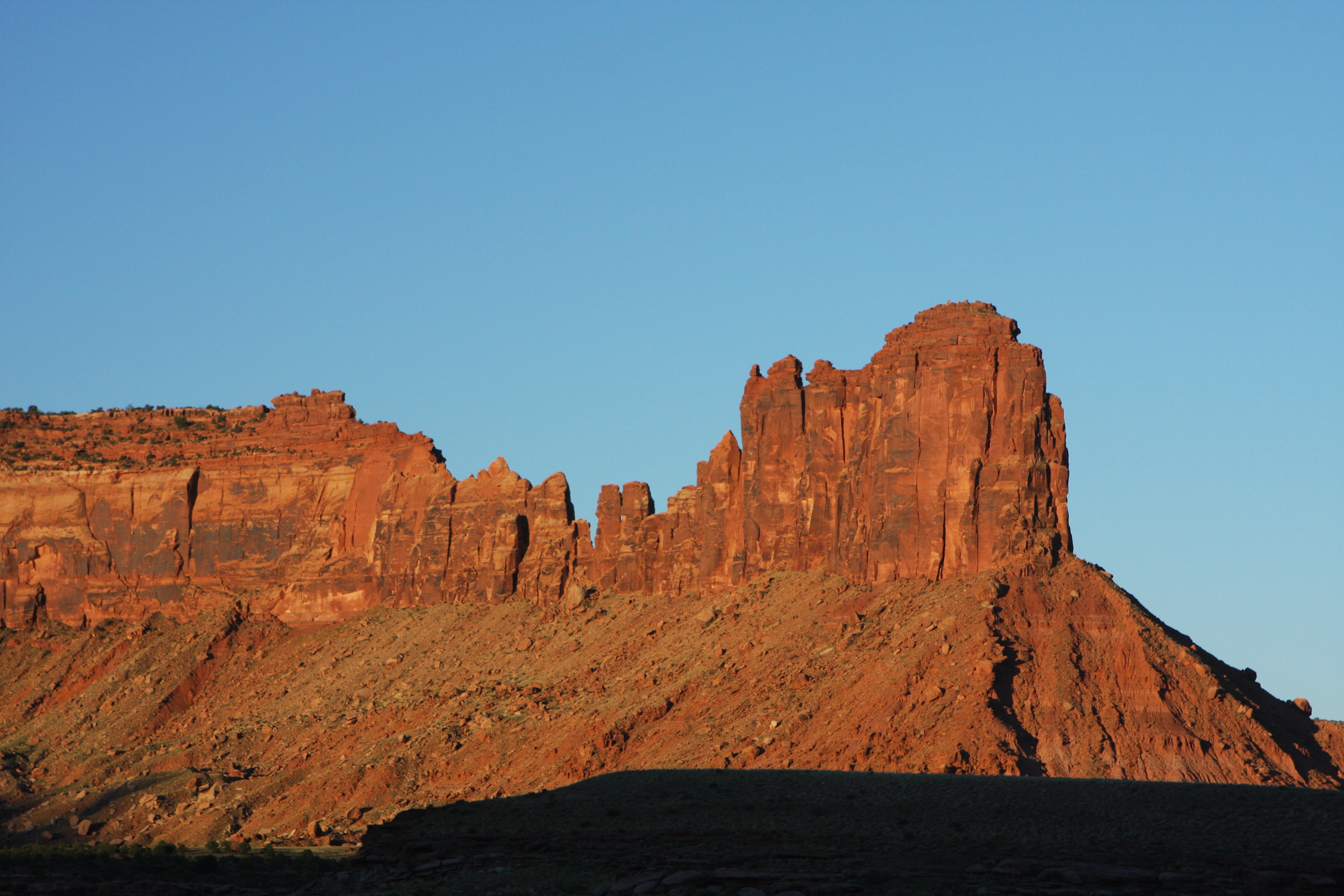
Bridger Jacks and Butte, from east

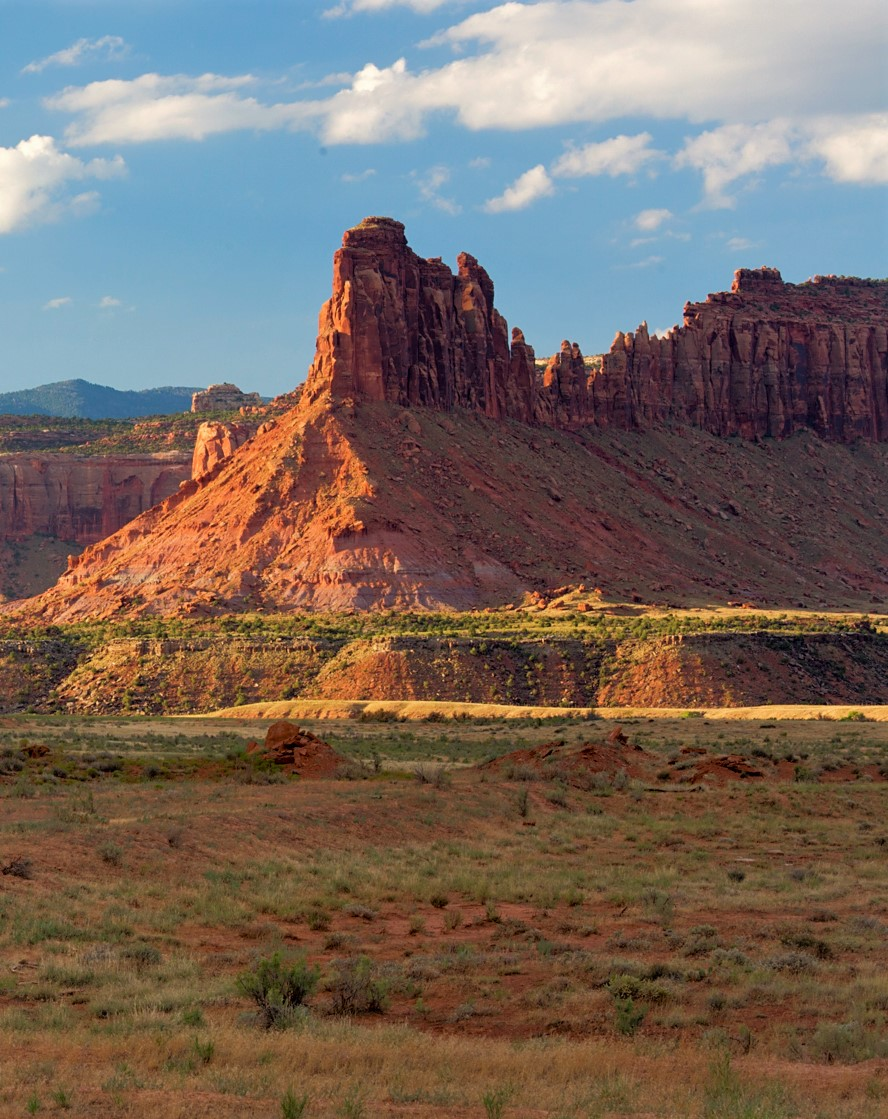
Northwest aspect

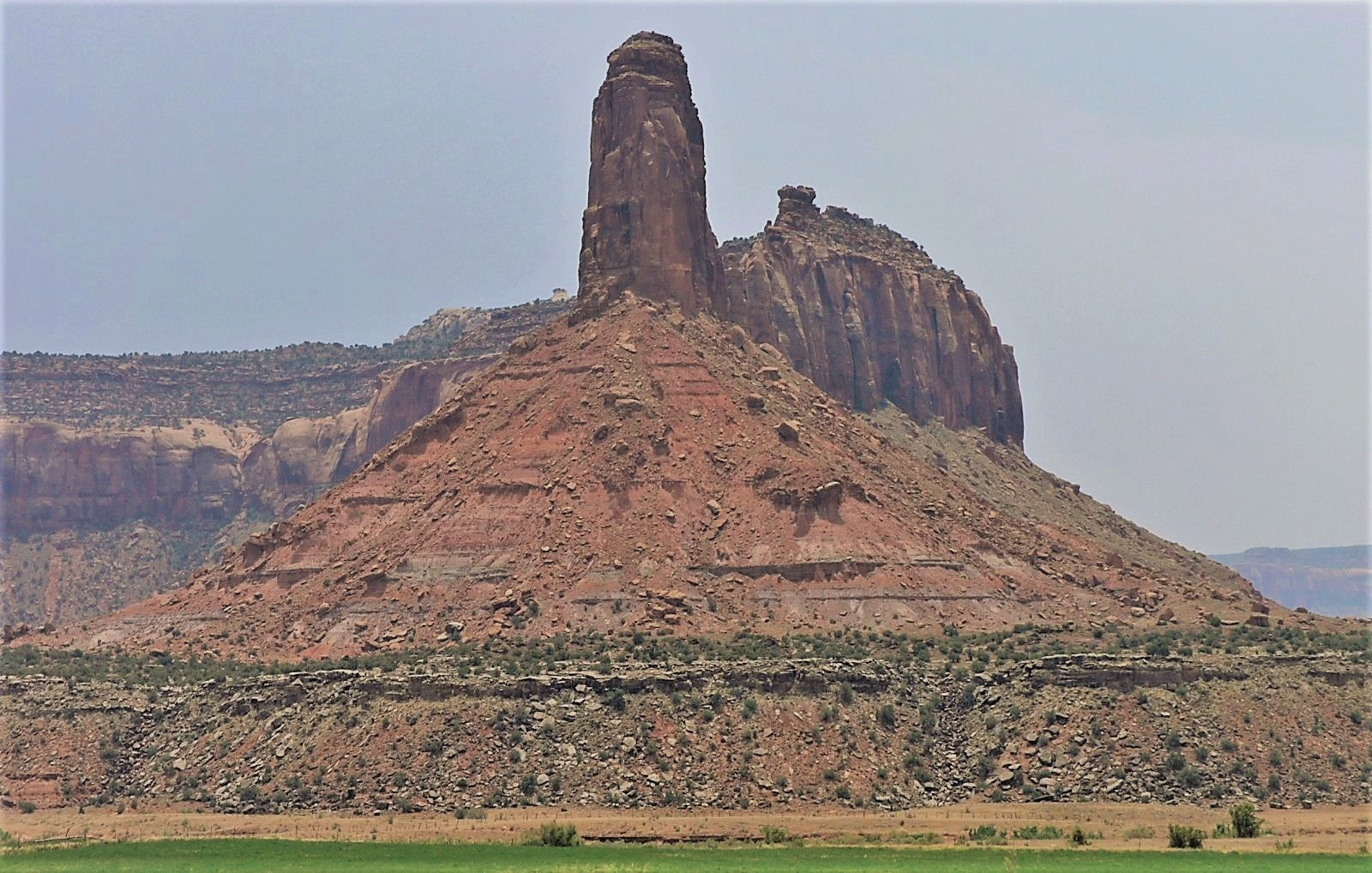
Bridger Jack Butte, north aspect

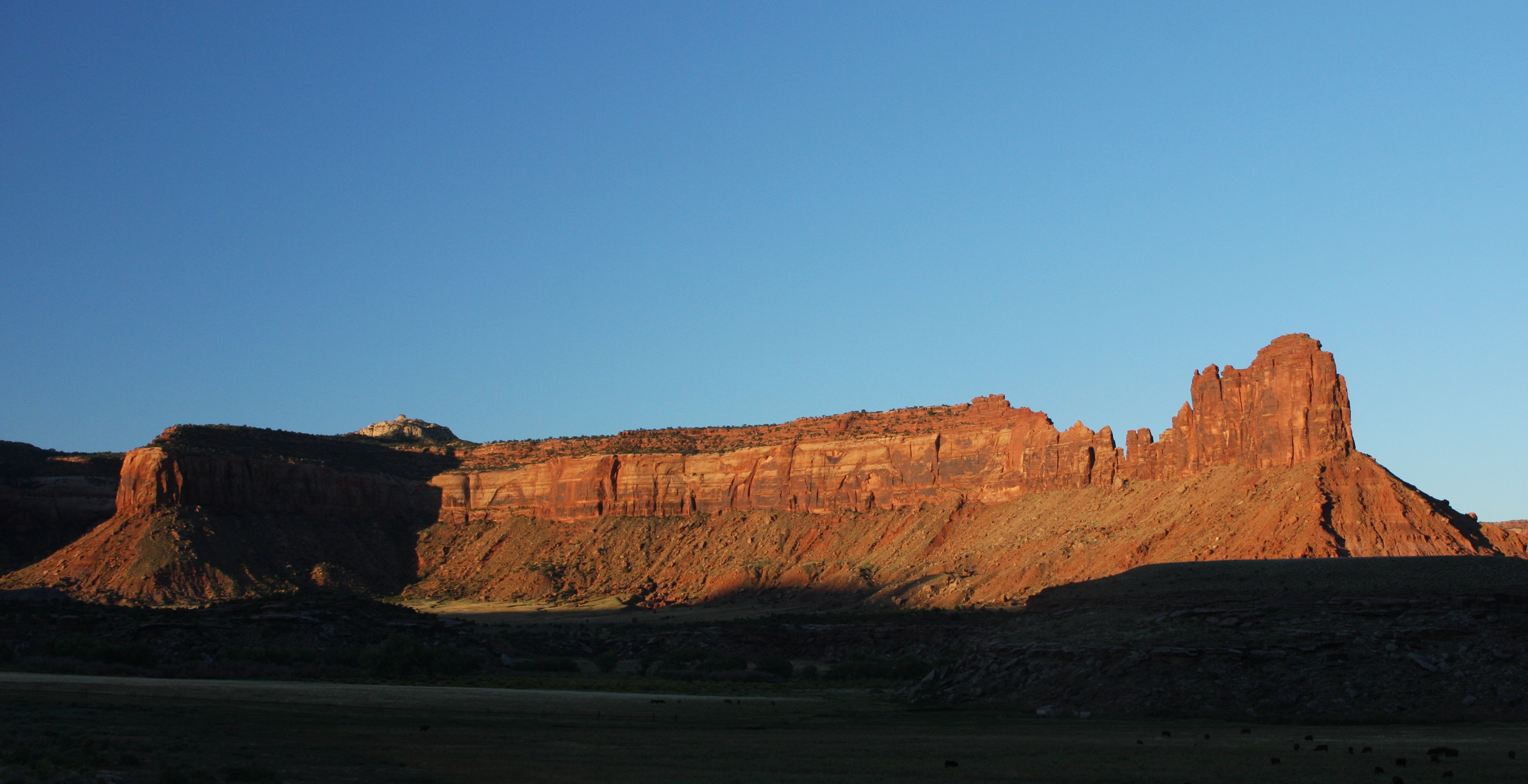
Bridger Jack Mesa and Butte (right)

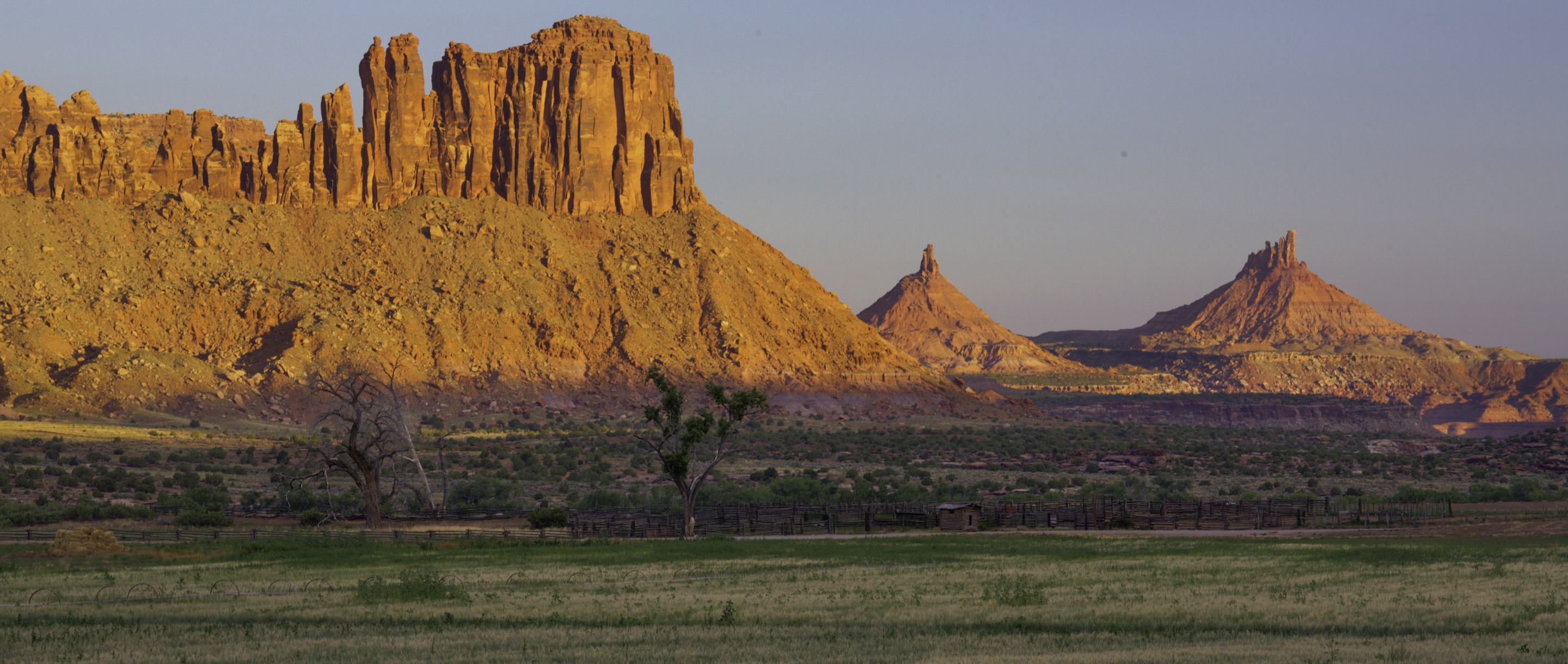
Bridger Jack Butte (left) with Sixshooter Peaks (right)

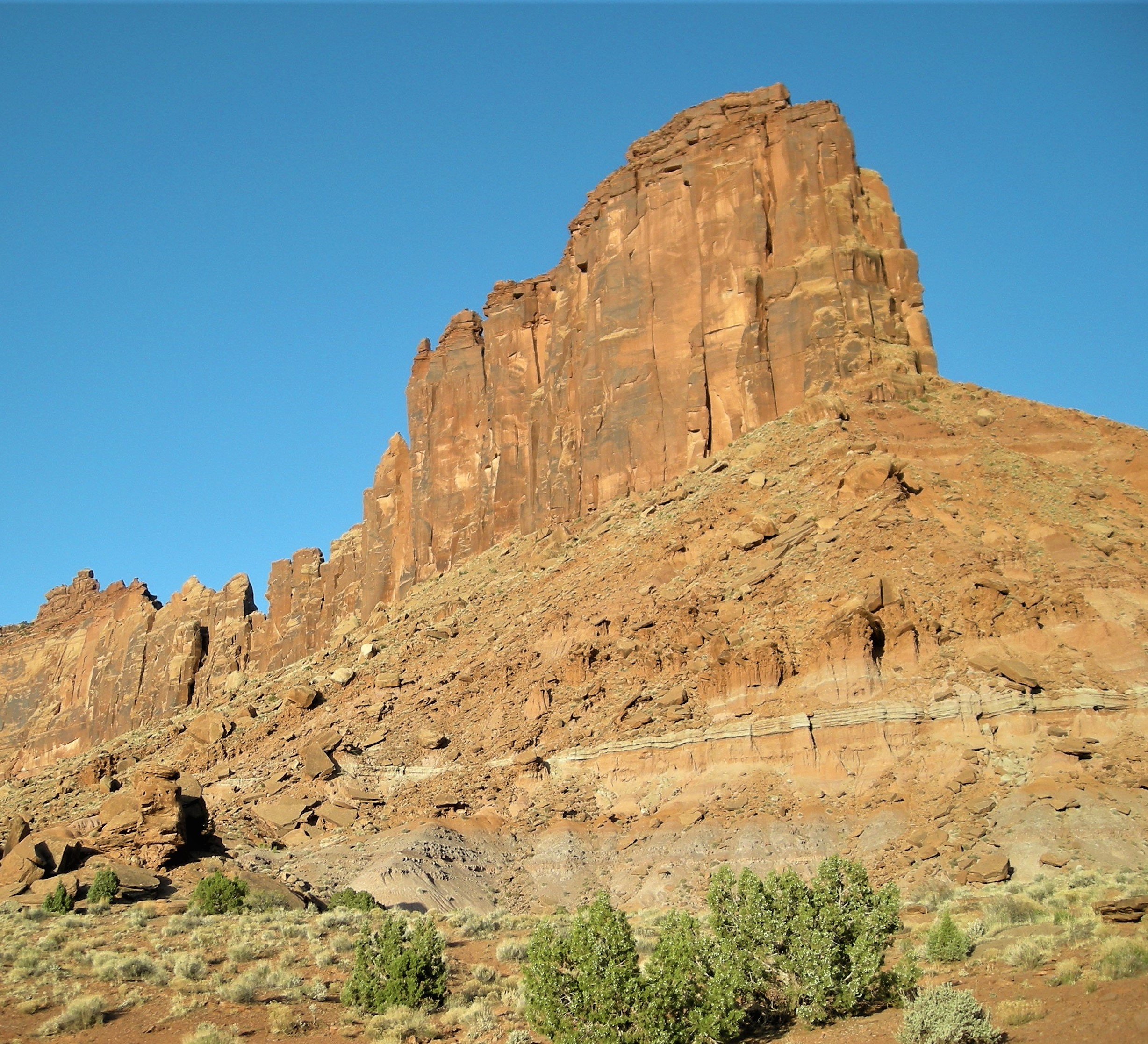

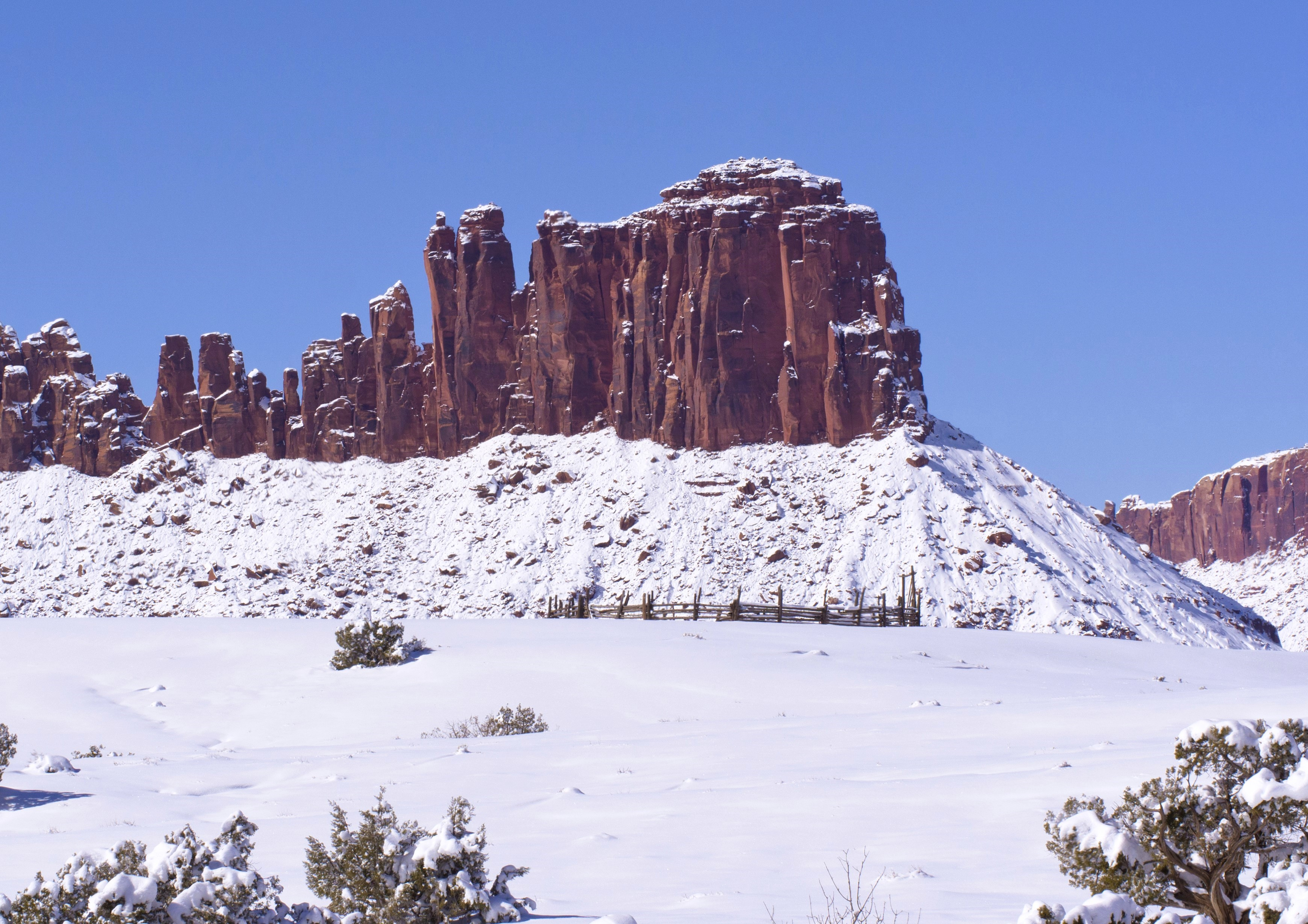
Bridger Jack Butte in winter

== See also ==
- Geology of the Canyonlands area
- Colorado Plateau
