= David Brower Center =

Californian nonprofit space

Coordinates: 37°52′10″N 122°15′59″W

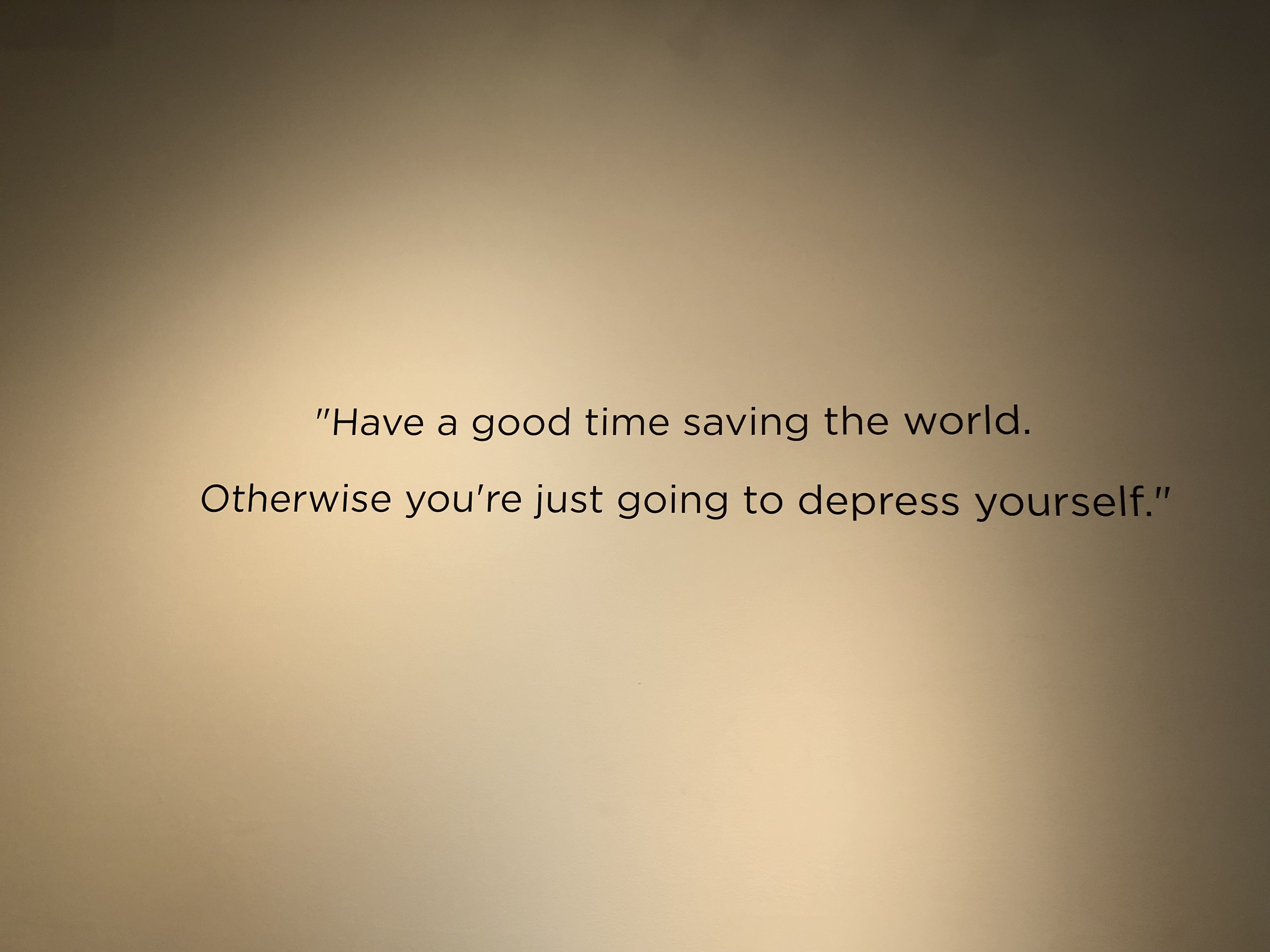
Photo of words printed on the wall at David Brower Center

The David Brower Center is a nonprofit space located in downtown Berkeley, California, containing three floors of office space, a gallery focusing primarily on environmental and social art, conference facilities, a 178-seat theater, and a restaurant, Gather. It was named in honor of David Brower, a Berkeley native, who was the first executive director of the Sierra Club and a backer of Marion Edey’s founding of the League of Conservation Voters. The center is part of a larger mixed-use development, that includes the Oxford Plaza (an affordable housing complex with street level commercial space). The David Brower Center's mission is to "inspire and nurture current and future generations of leaders, with the goal of making sustainable thinking and practices mainstream."

The center is home to dozens of organizations, which occupy the three floors of office space, including Earth Island Institute, Friends of the Earth (both of which were founded by David Brower), as well as Equity Community Builders, Impact Hub, Strategen, and several others.

In addition to housing nonprofit organizations, since 2009, the Hazel Wolf Gallery within the Brower Center has highlighted the work of many artists, including Sebastião Salgado, Daniel McCormick, David Liittschwager, Laura Cunningham, Isabella Kirkland, Chris Jordan, David Maisel, Jeffrey Long, Bill Curtsinger, Joseph Holmes, and more recently, Richard Misrach and Douglas Gayeton.

== Building Design ==
The Brower Center, which was designed by architectural studio WRT/Solomon E.T.C. (now with Mithun), completed construction and opened its doors in 2009. The center makes use of a number of sustainable technologies and design techniques that came out of a highly integrated design process including radiant heating and cooling, daylighting, shading, underfloor air distribution (UFAD), natural ventilation through operable windows, solar panels, rainwater harvesting, and a building dashboard. In 2010, the center received a LEED Platinum rating from the US Green Building Council. An occupant survey conducted by the Center for the Built Environment in the spring of 2010 indicated that the general satisfaction of the building is 1.78 out of a scale of -3 (very dissatisfied) to +3 (very satisfied). In a post occupancy evaluation conducted by an architecture class at the University of California, Berkeley, over half of the questionnaire respondents said that the building was inspiring in regard to sustainability.

=== Heating and Cooling ===
The primary method for space conditioning is a hydronic, in-slab radiant system that is located in the exposed concrete ceiling slabs on the 2nd, 3rd, and 4th floors. These systems are often referred to as thermally activated building systems. The radiant system is used for both heating and cooling. To chill the water in the radiant system, the system makes use of a cooling tower located on the roof. Because the radiant system has a large surface area and high thermal mass, it is able to use warmer chilled water temperatures than a typical cooling system. This makes it a good match for non-compressor-based cooling. The cooling tower is able to chill the supply water using only the outdoor air, without any chiller.

=== Daylighting ===
The offices in the David Brower Center have almost 100% continuous daylighting autonomy. This metric indicates the percentage of occupied hours that can rely purely on sunlight for lighting the space. The building achieves this continuous daylight autonomy through the use of light shelves and glazed facades on the south and east sides of the building, in addition to a fairly narrow building depth of 8.2 metres (27 ft). The heights of individual floors were driven by daylight availability and programmatic requirements. The ground floor, which has reduced daylight availability due to surrounding site obstructions, has the highest floor-to-floor height, while the top floor, which is partially daylit from roof-level skylights, has the lowest floor-to-floor height.

=== Shading and Solar Panels ===
Lining the façade of the David Brower Center are fixed exterior aluminum louvers. These louvers block the direct sun and minimize heat gains within the building. In addition to the exterior shading devices, occupants can make further adjustments from within the building using manually operated interior roller fabric shades above each window.

On top of the David Brower Center, there is a 68 kilowatts (91 hp) photovoltaic array that offsets approximately 35 percent of the building's electricity energy demand. The solar panels are located on the northern and southern edges of the roof parapet, and double as an awning for the southern façade to reduce solar heat gain. The PV array is orientation is design for maximum exposure to daylight.

=== Building Structure ===
The Brower Center is designed to withstand seismic activity by allowing the structure to flex without incurring serious deformation. This is done through the combination of horizontally post-tensioned moment frames with a vertically post-tensioned core. The core comprises uniformly arrayed columns and two centrally located, C-shaped, walls. The entire structure is supported by a mat foundation.

All concrete used in the building structure contains slag, a byproduct of steel manufacturing. Slag is used to substitute a portion of the Portland cement (70% in the foundations and 50% in the superstructure). The addition of slag reduced an estimated 5000 tons of CO_{2} emissions from the concrete production.
