= Sixshooter Peaks =

Pair of summits in San Juan County, Utah, United States

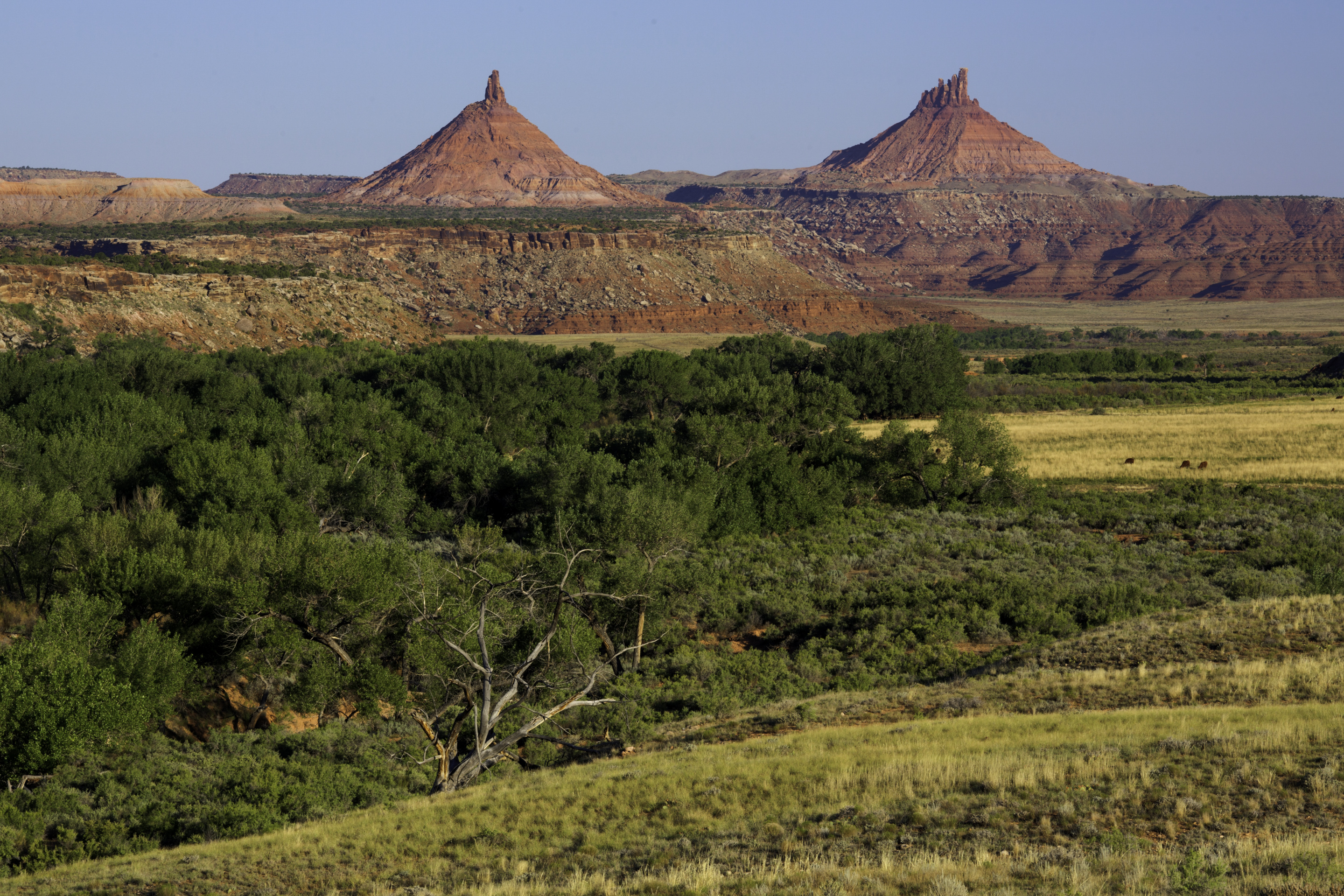
- Six-shooter Peaks, east aspect

Highest point
- Elevation: 6,379 ft (1,944 m)
- Prominence: 679 ft (207 m)
- Isolation: 4.37 mi (7.03 km)
- Coordinates: 38°08′15″N 109°40′05″W

Geography
- Location within Utah Location within the United States
- Country: United States
- State: Utah
- County: San Juan
- Parent range: Colorado Plateau
- Topo map(s): USGS North Six-shooter Peak and South Six-shooter Peak

Geology
- Rock age: Late Triassic
- Rock type: Wingate Sandstone

Climbing
- First ascent: 1962
- Easiest route: class 5.7 climbing

The Sixshooter Peaks are two iconic sandstone summits in San Juan County, Utah, United States. The larger and higher North Sixshooter Peak rises to an elevation of 6,379 feet (1,944 meters), whereas South Sixshooter Peak rises to 6,154 feet, with approximately 1.5 miles (2.4 km) separation between the two. These buttes tower nearly 1,400 feet (430 meters) above the surrounding terrain, and are historic landmarks visible from State Route 211 between Newspaper Rock and the Needles District of Canyonlands National Park. They are situated 1.5 mile outside the boundary of the park, and four miles northwest of Bridger Jack Butte. Variant names for the peaks include "North Six-Shooter Peak", "South Six-shooter Peak", "Six Shooter Peaks", and "Six-shooter Peak". They are so named because of their resemblance to a pair of revolvers pointing skyward.

== Geology ==
Sixshooter Peaks are composed of hard, fine-grained Wingate Sandstone, which is the remains of wind-borne sand dunes deposited approximately 200 million years ago in the Late Triassic. This Wingate sandstone forms steep cliffs as it overlays softer layers of the Chinle Formation which formed conical mounds beneath the Wingate towers. The layer below this is Moenkopi Formation. In the early 1980s, land surrounding South Sixshooter Peak was considered for the nation's first high-level nuclear waste repository, because thick salt beds 3,000 feet below the surface were potential host rocks for storing radioactive materials. Precipitation runoff drains into nearby Indian Creek, which is part of the Colorado River drainage basin.

== Climbing ==
The first ascent of North Sixshooter Peak was made April 14, 1962, by Maurice Horn, Huntley Ingalls, and Steve Komito via Southwest Chimney. South Sixshooter Peak was first climbed in September 1969 by Billy Roos, Burnham Arndt, and Denver Collins. The popular south peak is a good climb for beginners and has one of the easiest tower routes in the Indian Creek climbing area.

=== North Sixshooter Peak climbing routes ===
- Talk Dusty To Me class 5.9+
- Southeast Chimney Route class 5.10 A1
- Liquid Sky class 5.11+
- Shadows Route class 5.10
- Gunsmoke class 5.11+
- Lightning Bolt Cracks class 5.11-
- Perfect Hands All the Way class 5.11+
- Pratt's Crack class 5.10

=== South Sixshooter Peak climbing routes ===
- South Face routes class 5.6 to 5.11

== Climate ==
Spring and fall are the most favorable seasons to visit the Sixshooter Peaks. According to the Köppen climate classification system, they are located in a Cold semi-arid climate zone, which is defined by the coldest month having an average mean temperature below 32 °F (0 °C), and at least 50% of the total annual precipitation being received during the spring and summer. This desert climate receives less than 10 inches (250 millimeters) of annual rainfall, and snowfall is generally light during the winter.

== Gallery ==
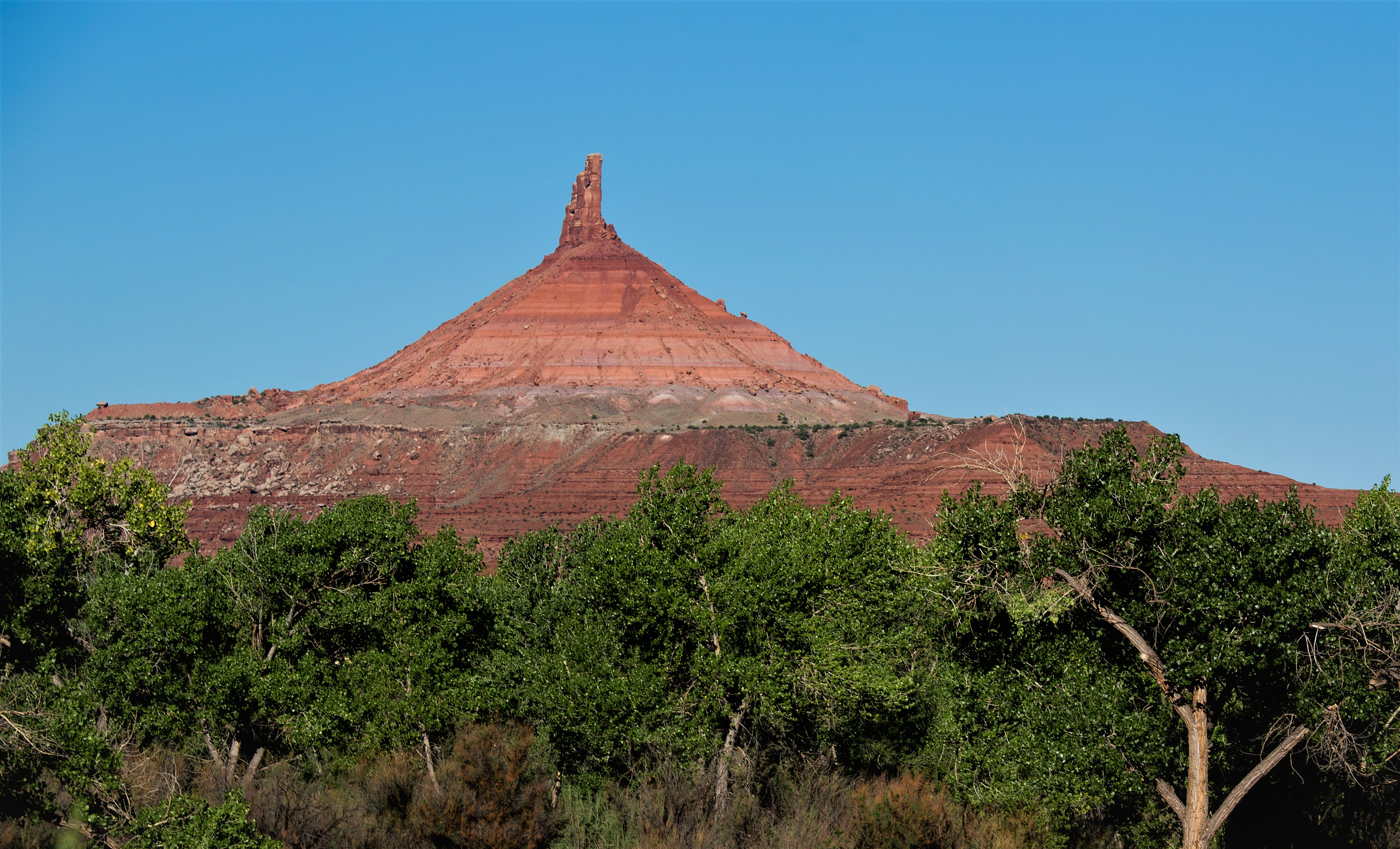
North Sixshooter Peak, northeast aspect

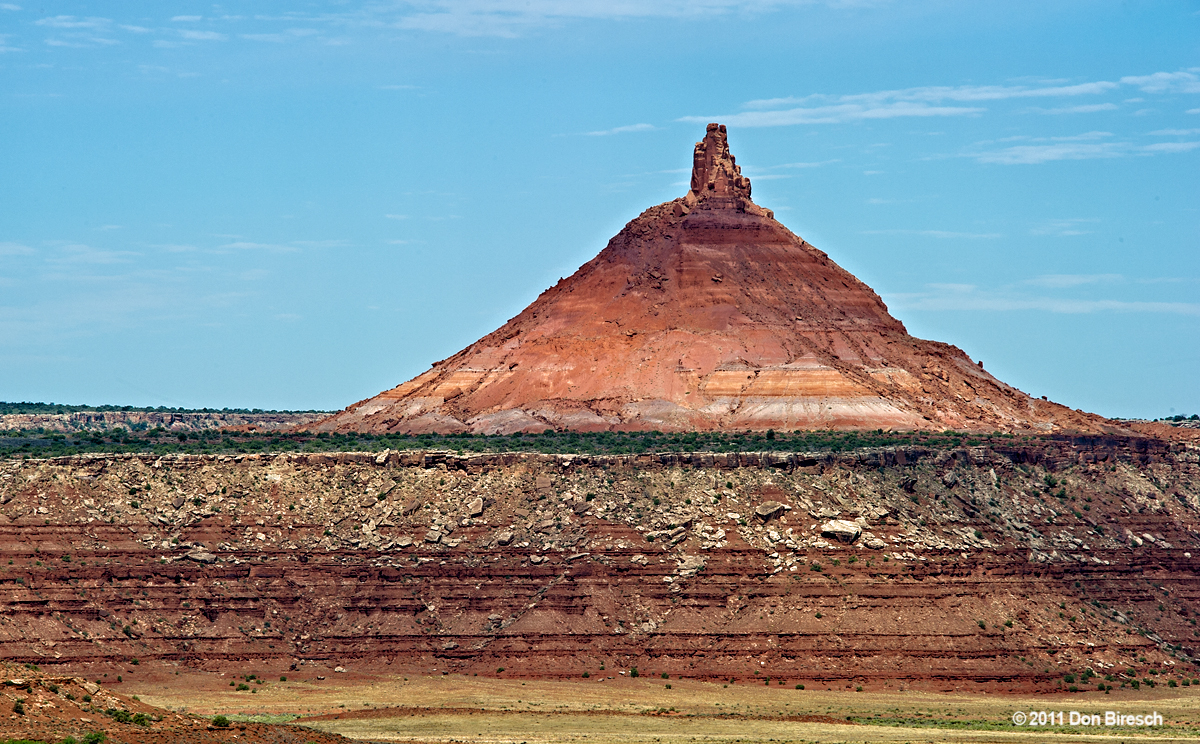
South Sixshooter Peak

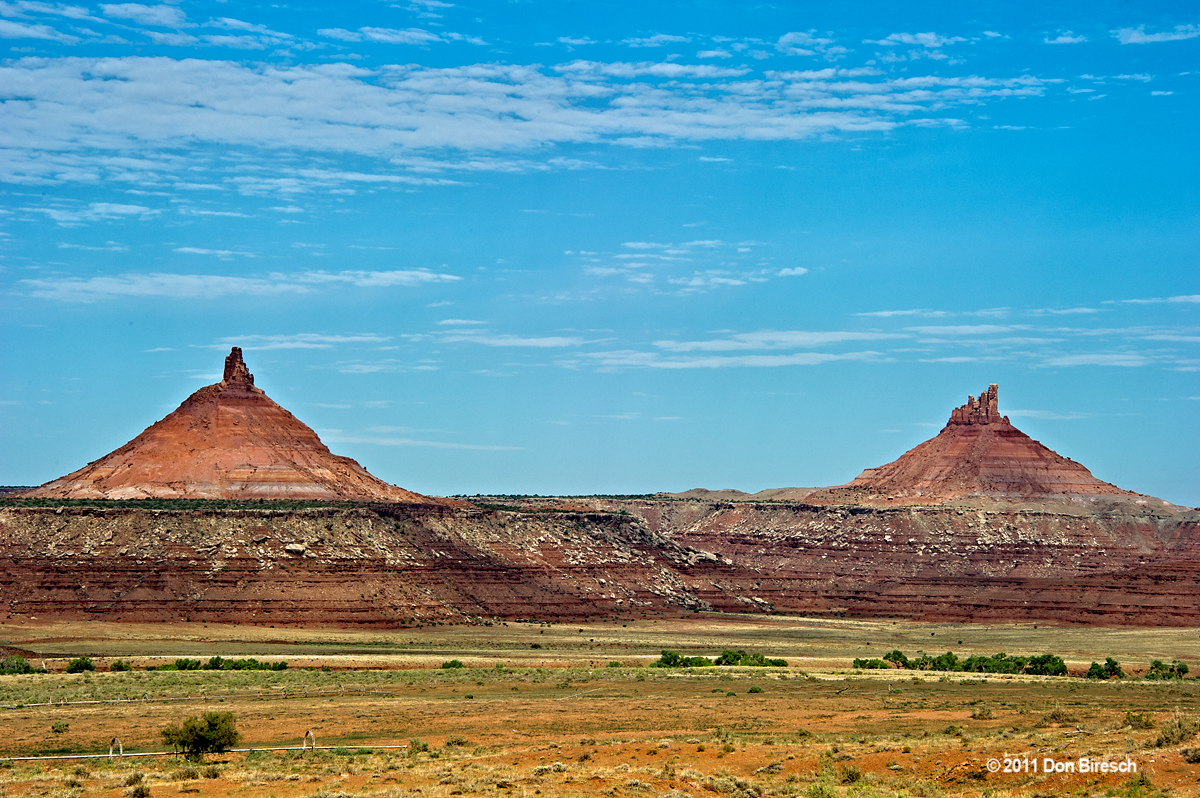
South Sixshooter (left), and North Peak to right

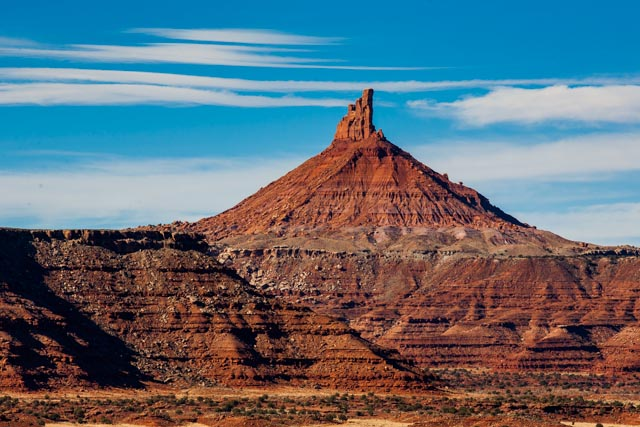
North Sixshooter Peak, northeast aspect

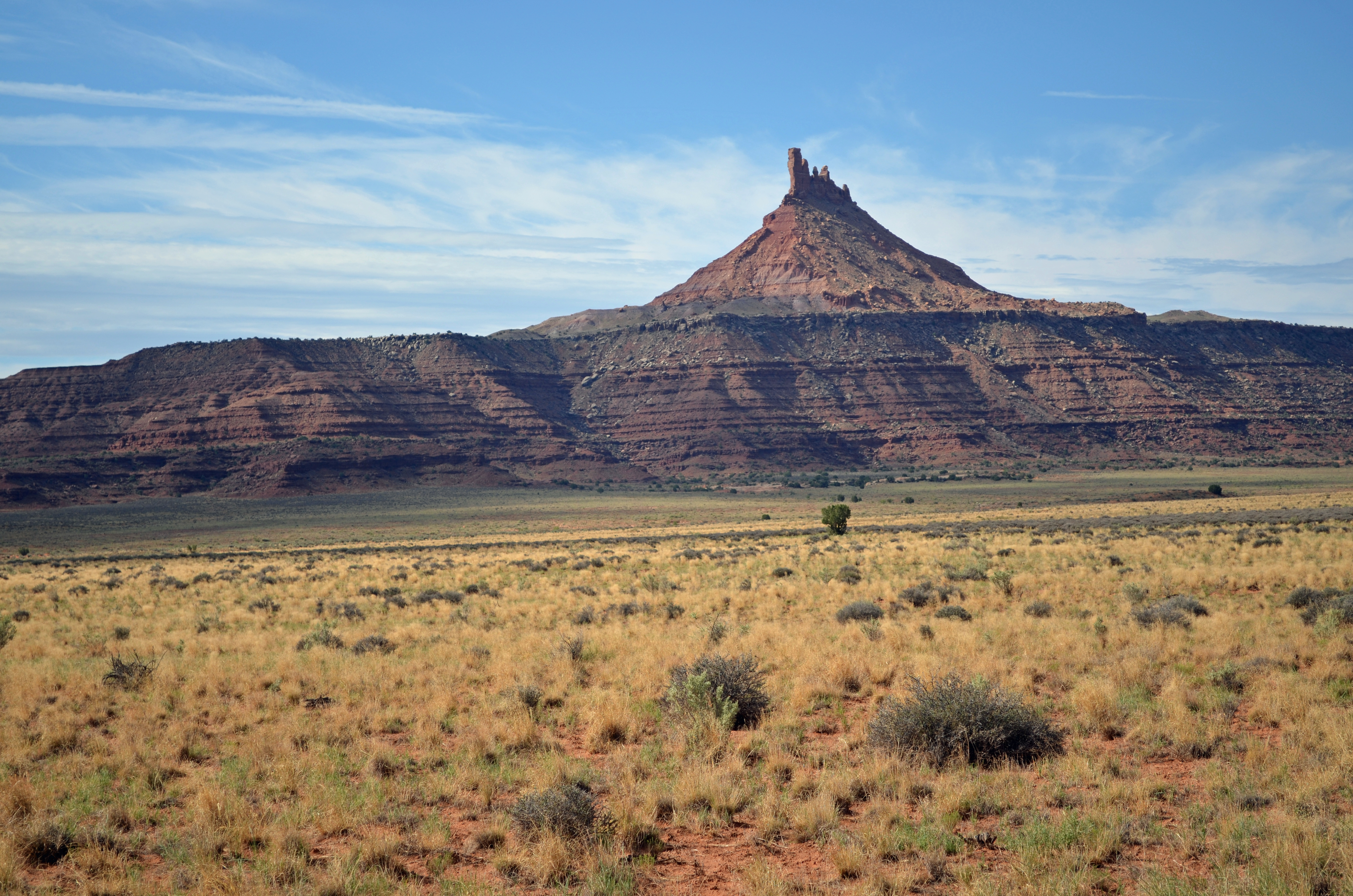
North Sixshooter Peak

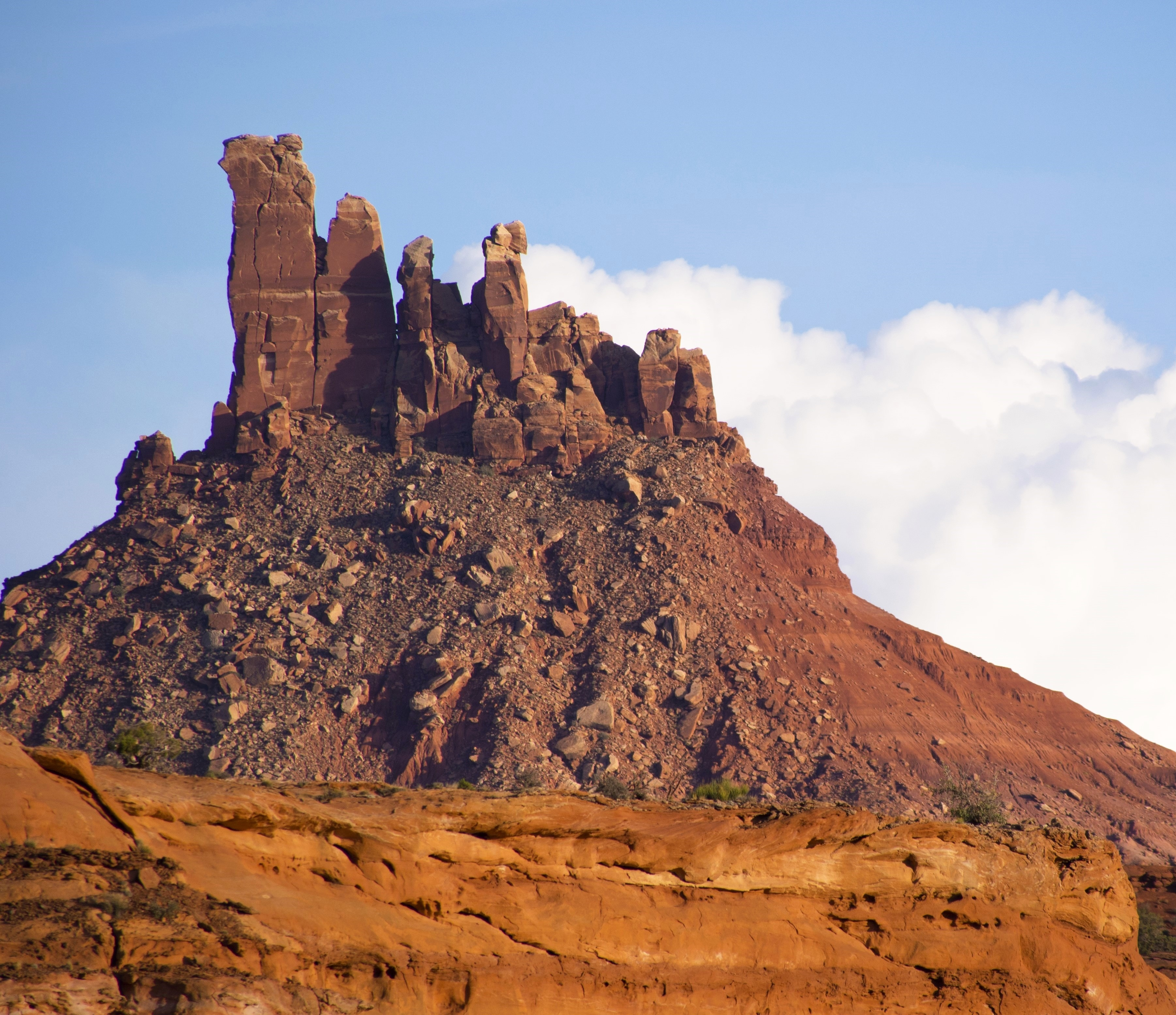
North Sixshooter Peak

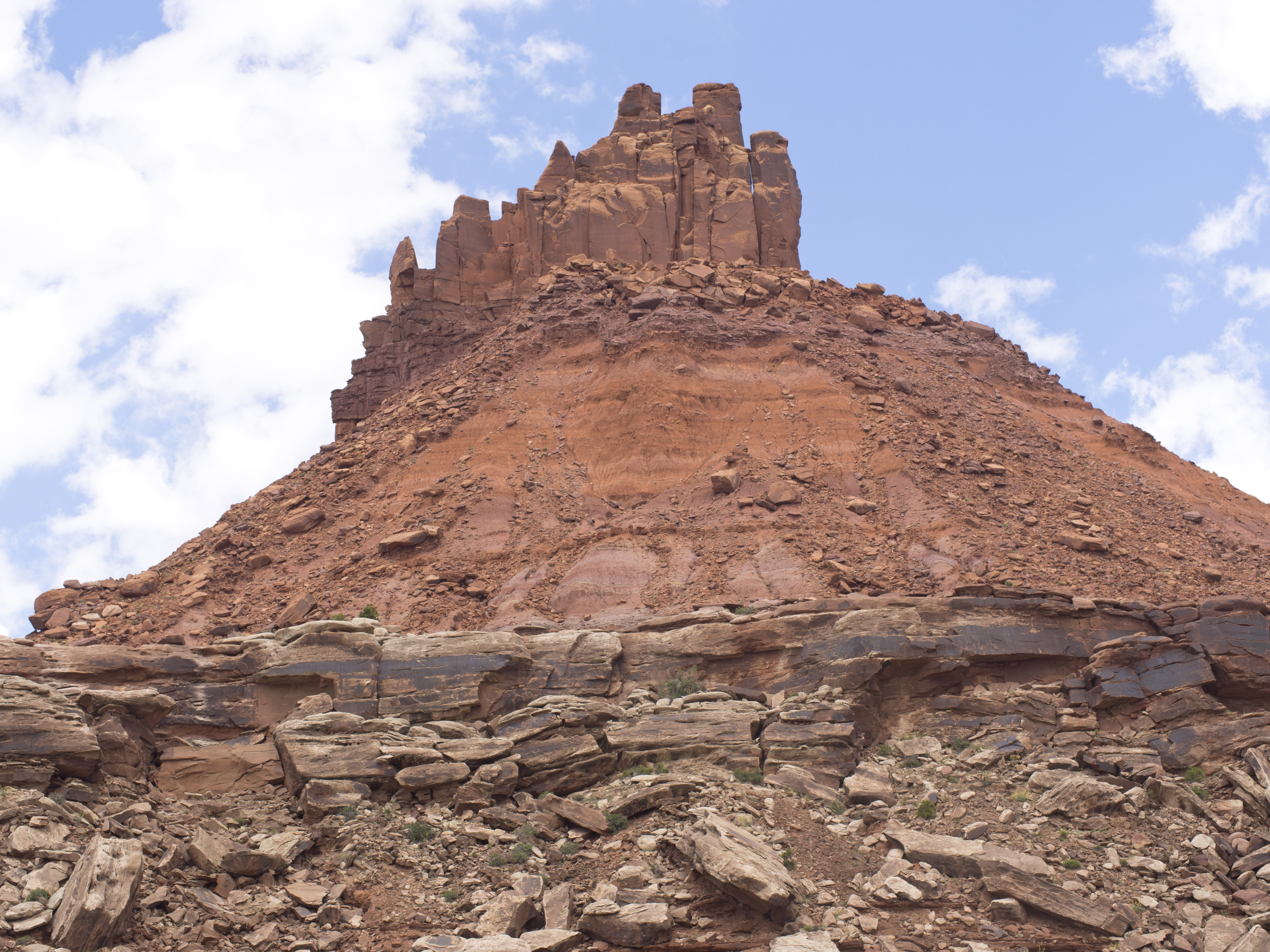
South Sixshooter Peak

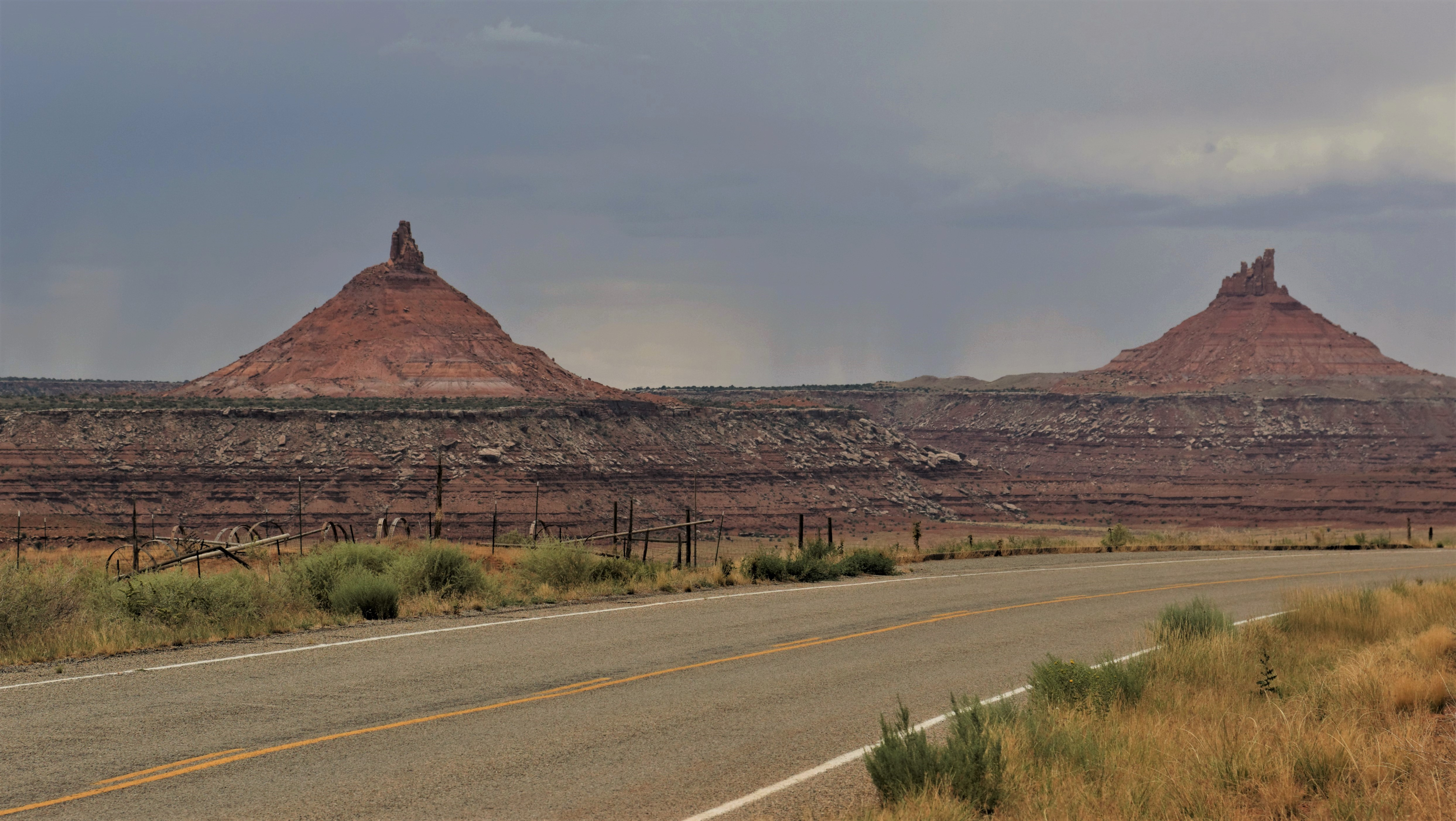
Sixshooter Peaks from State Route 211

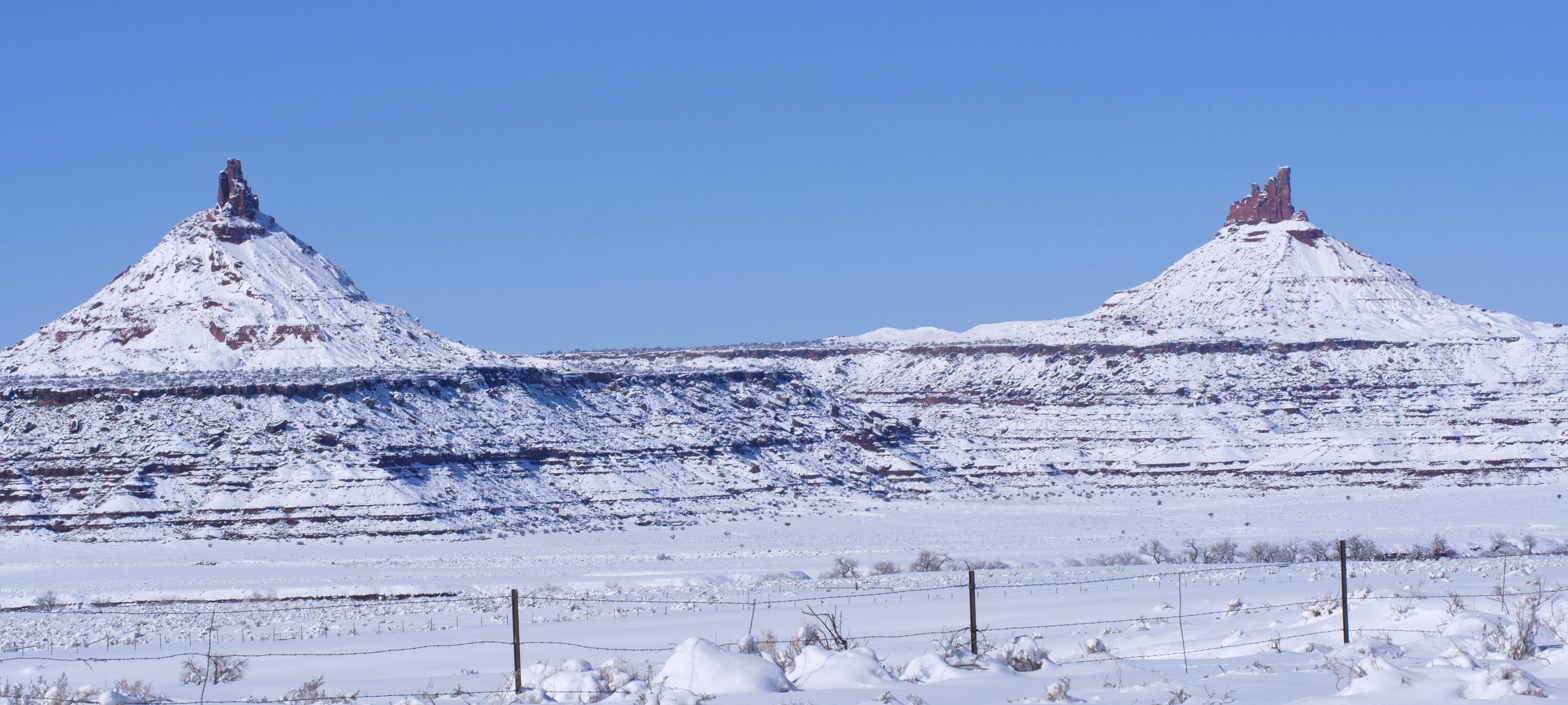
Sixshooter Peaks in winter

== See also ==
- Lit of mountains in Utah
- Geology of the Canyonlands area
- Colorado Plateau
