= Andrew Lawler =

American journalist and author (born 1961)

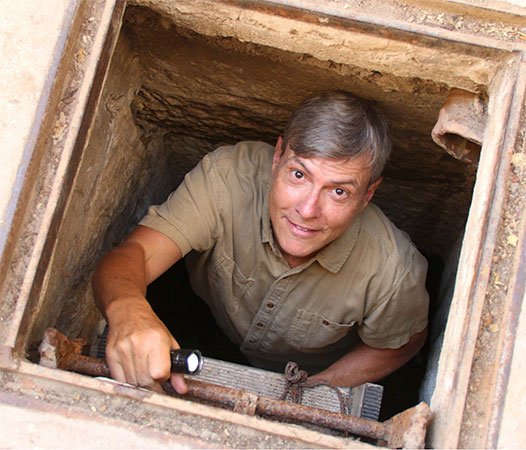
- Lawler in 2020
- Born: Andrew Francis Lawler; May 25, 1961 (age 65)
- Occupations: Journalist; author
- Website: www.andrewlawler.com

Andrew Francis Lawler (born May 25, 1961) is an American journalist and author.

== Career ==
He has written for The New York Times, National Geographic, Smithsonian, Science, Archaeology, Scientific American and other publications. Lawler investigated the looting of the National Museum of Iraq in Baghdad as well as ancient sites during the American-led 2003 Iraq invasion. He also reported on cultural heritage destruction in Afghanistan from the Taliban’s 2001 fall from power until their return in 2021.

Lawler has written four books, including the national bestseller The Secret Token: Myth, Obsession, and the Search for the Lost Colony of Roanoke. "Mr. Lawler is an intrepid guide to this treacherous territory," noted The Economist, which called The Secret Token "lively and engaging," though The Wall Street Journal chided the author for giving a "social justice" spin to the tale. His third book is Under Jerusalem: The Buried History of the World’s Most Contested City, which The Washington Post called "a sweeping tale of archaeological exploits and their cultural and political consequences told with a historian's penchant for detail and a journalist's flair for narration." The book received the 2024 Felicia A. Holton Award from the Archaeological Institute of America, with the award committee praising "Mr. Lawler’s skillful use of prose" that highlighted "archaeology’s impact on the modern world."

His fourth book, A Perfect Frenzy: A Royal Governor, His Black Allies, and the Crisis that Spurred the American Revolution was published in 2025. The New York Times wrote that "the absorbing result of his meticulous research" is "a sharp-eyed look at the messy, sometimes absurd, often cruel birth pangs of a nation." The Wall Street Journal called it a "compelling, impeccably researched account."

== Works ==
- Lawler, Andrew (2025). A Perfect Frenzy: A Royal Governor, His Black Allies, and the Crisis that Spurred the American Revolution. New York: Atlantic Monthly Press. ISBN 978-0802164131.
- Lawler, Andrew (2021). Under Jerusalem: The Buried History of the World's Most Contested City. New York: Doubleday. ISBN 978-0-385-54685-0. OCLC 1235903466.
- Lawler, Andrew (2018). The Secret Token: Myth, Obsession, and the Search for the Lost Colony of Roanoke. New York: Doubleday. ISBN 978-0-385-54201-2. OCLC 1003666494.
- Lawler, Andrew (2014). Why Did the Chicken Cross the World?: The Epic Saga of the Bird that Powers Civilization. New York: Atria Books. ISBN 978-1-4767-2989-3. OCLC 873006410.
