= David Liittschwager =

American photographer and author

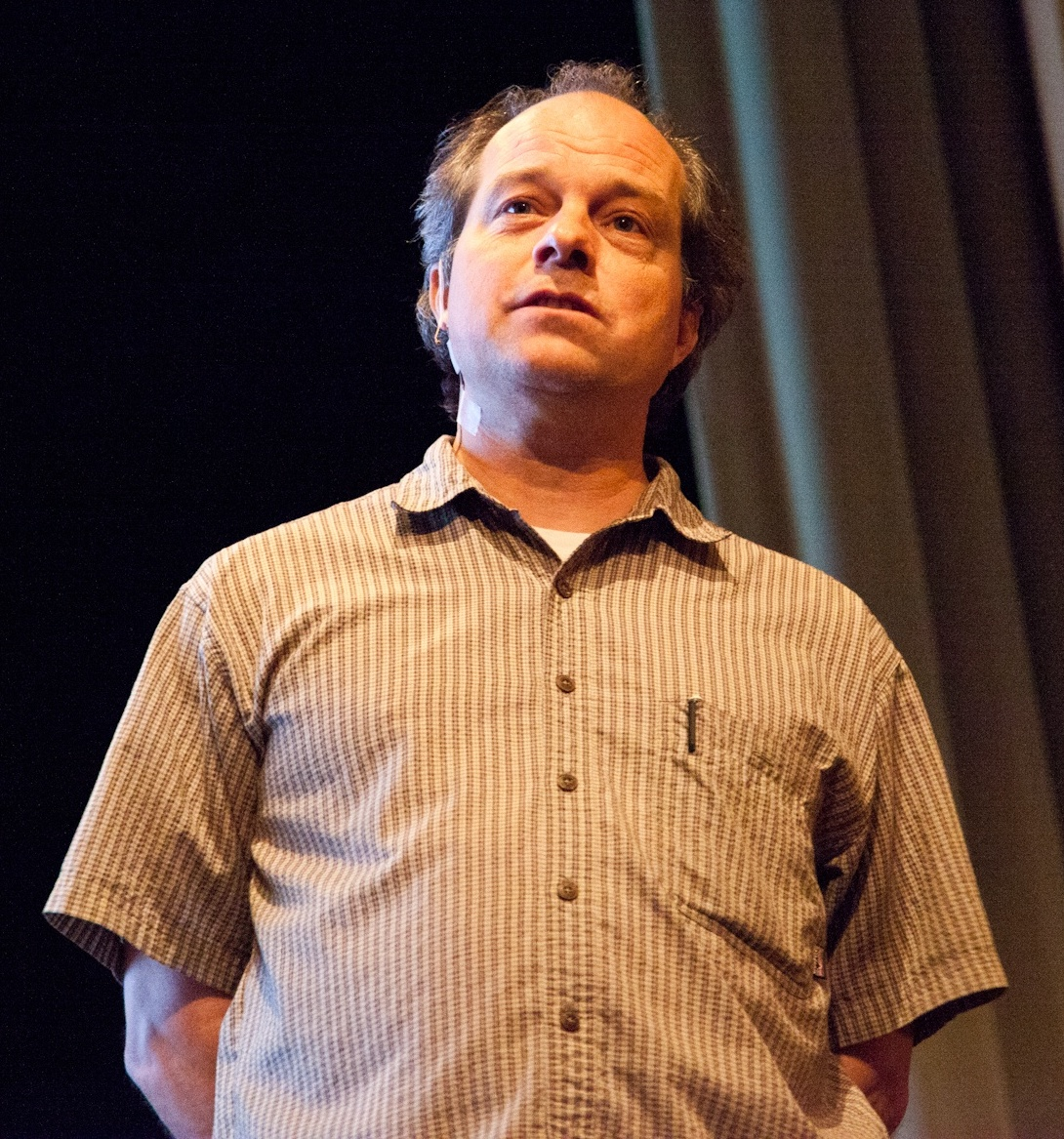
Liittschwager in 2011

David Liittschwager is an American freelance photographer and author of three books. Liittschwager was born in 1961 and was an assistant photographer of Richard Avedon from 1983 to 1986. and Later on, he became a freelance photographer for such magazines as Audubon, National Geographic and Scientific American among others. In 2002 he was a producer of a film called Skulls and X-Ray Ichthyology: The Structure of Fishes which he made for the California Academy of Sciences and six years later became a co-author of a book called Edible Schoolyard which was authored by Alice Waters. In 2011 he was asked by David Brower Center in Berkeley, California to commission Third Annual Art Exhibition and in 2012 University of Chicago Press published his book called One Cubic Foot.
