= Davide Bonadonna =

Paleoartist

- Known for: Paleoart, scientific illustration and digital sculpting
- Website: www.davidebonadonna.it

Davide Bonadonna is an Italian scientific and medical illustrator best known for his paleontological reconstructions of extinct animals. His work has been published in a number of books, museums, and magazines, including his murals in the National Geographic Museum's Spinosaurus exhibit and illustrations in books published by Simon and Schuster. He was awarded the Society of Vertebrate Paleontology's John J. Lanzendorf PaleoArt Prize in 2010 for his restoration of dinosaur Diplodocus carnegii.
