= Indian Creek (climbing area) =

Climbing area in Canyonlands, Utah

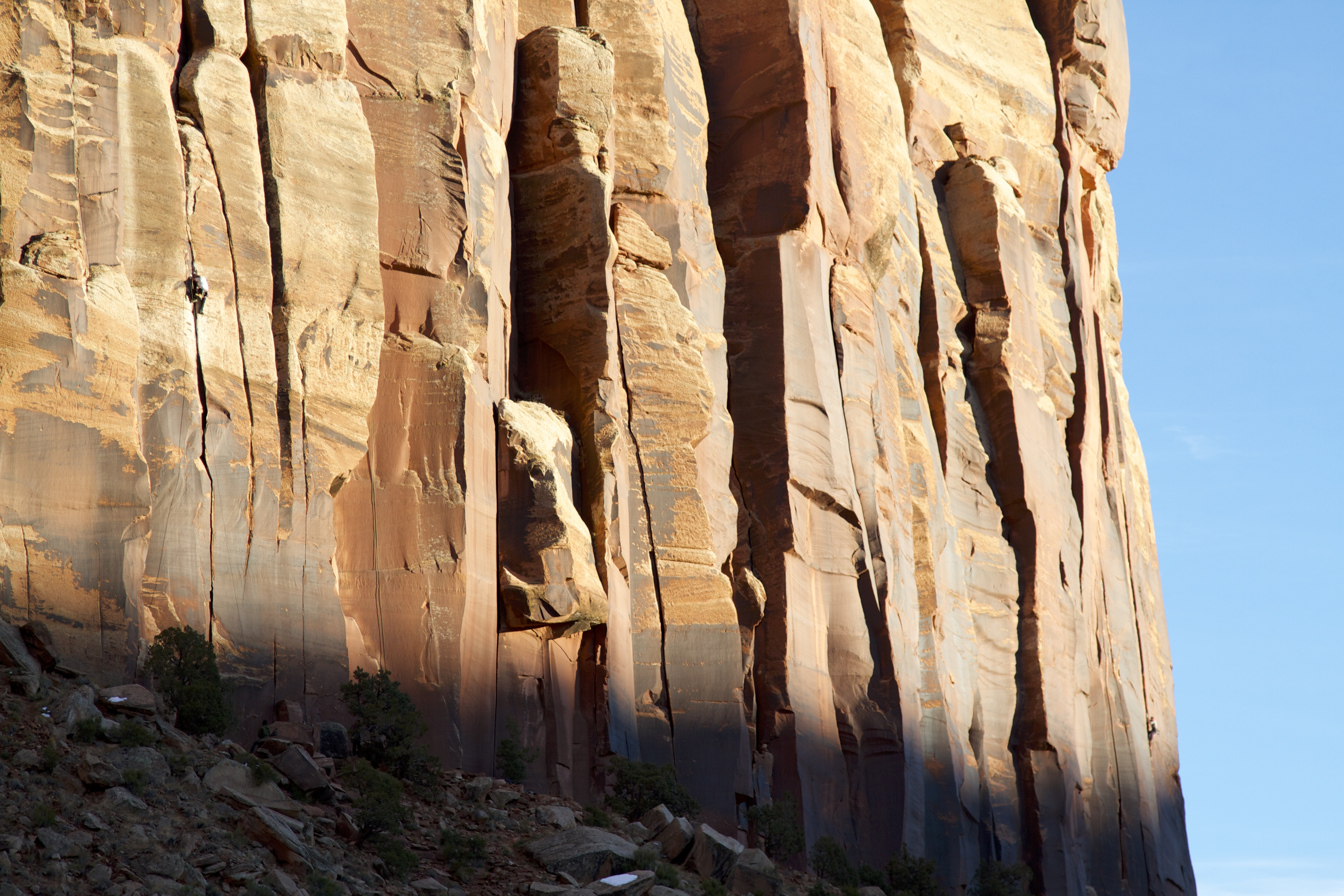
- Climbers in Indian Creek, Utah

- Location within Utah
- Nearest city: Monticello, Utah
- Coordinates: 38°01′32.88″N 109°32′24.00″W
- Type of climbing: traditional crack climbing crag
- Rock type: sandstone
- Elevation: 5,765 feet (1,757 m)
- Ownership: Bureau of Land Management
- Camping: free

Indian Creek is a climbing area in the northern part of the Bears Ears National Monument in the canyonlands area of San Juan County, Utah, United States. Renowned for its sandstone crack climbing. It has an elevation of 5,765 feet (1,757 m).

== Climbing routes ==
There are 1,721 climbing routes to choose from, with 96.6% being traditional classic climbing routes. Though, very few routes are recommended for beginners. Depending on time of year, there may be closures of certain climbing routes for bird nesting season or generally high bird activity areas.

== Gallery ==
Climbers

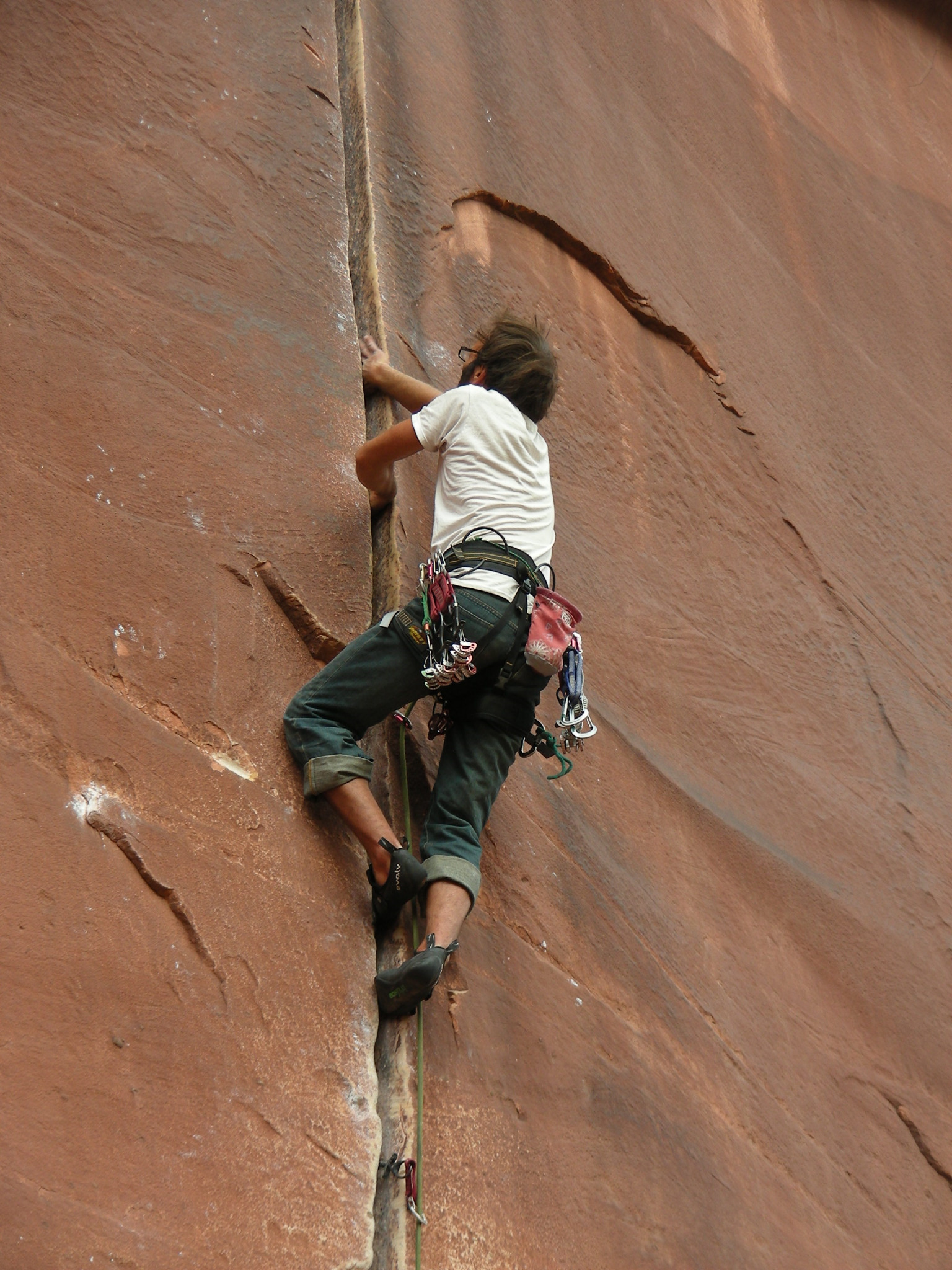

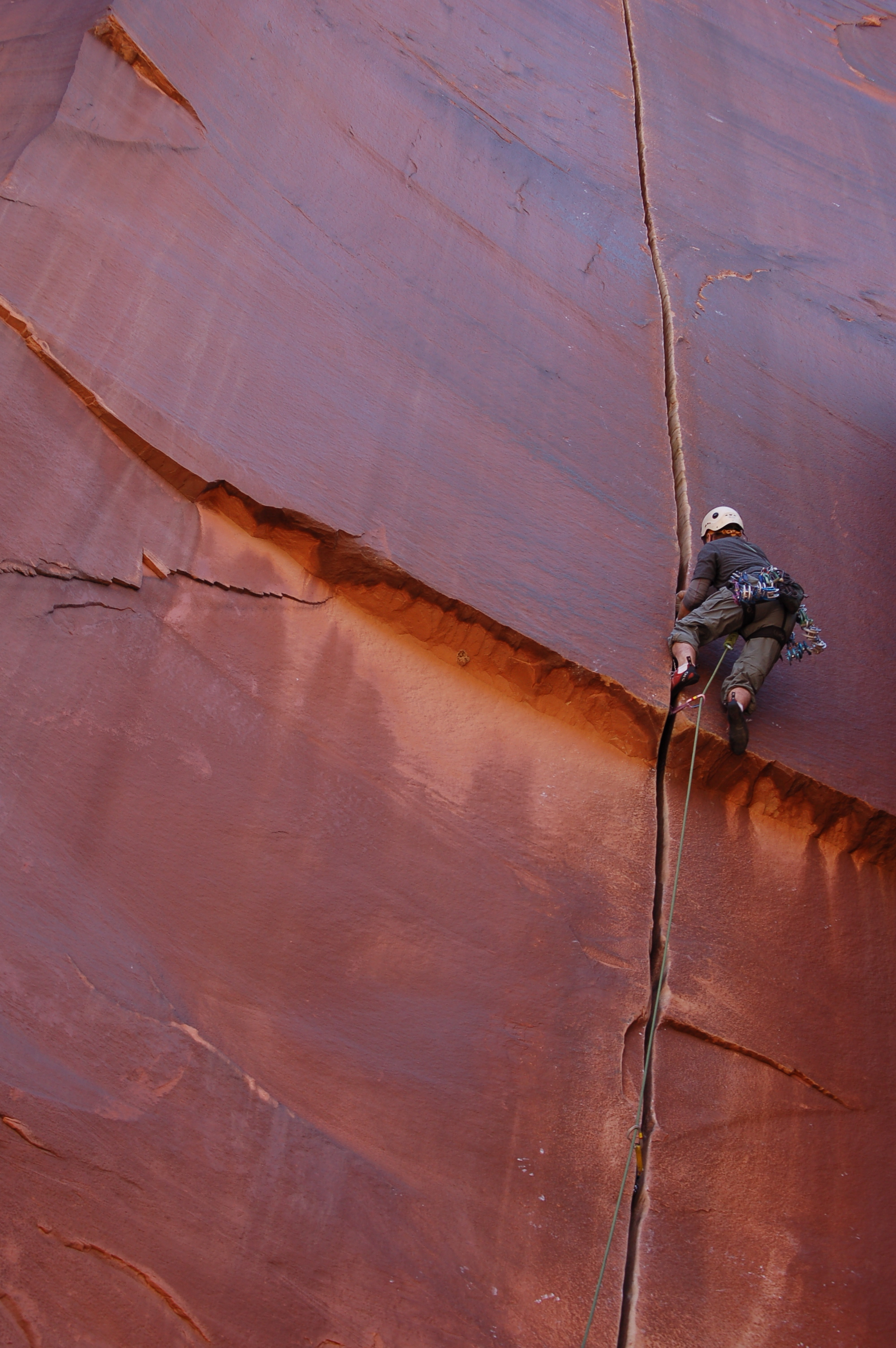

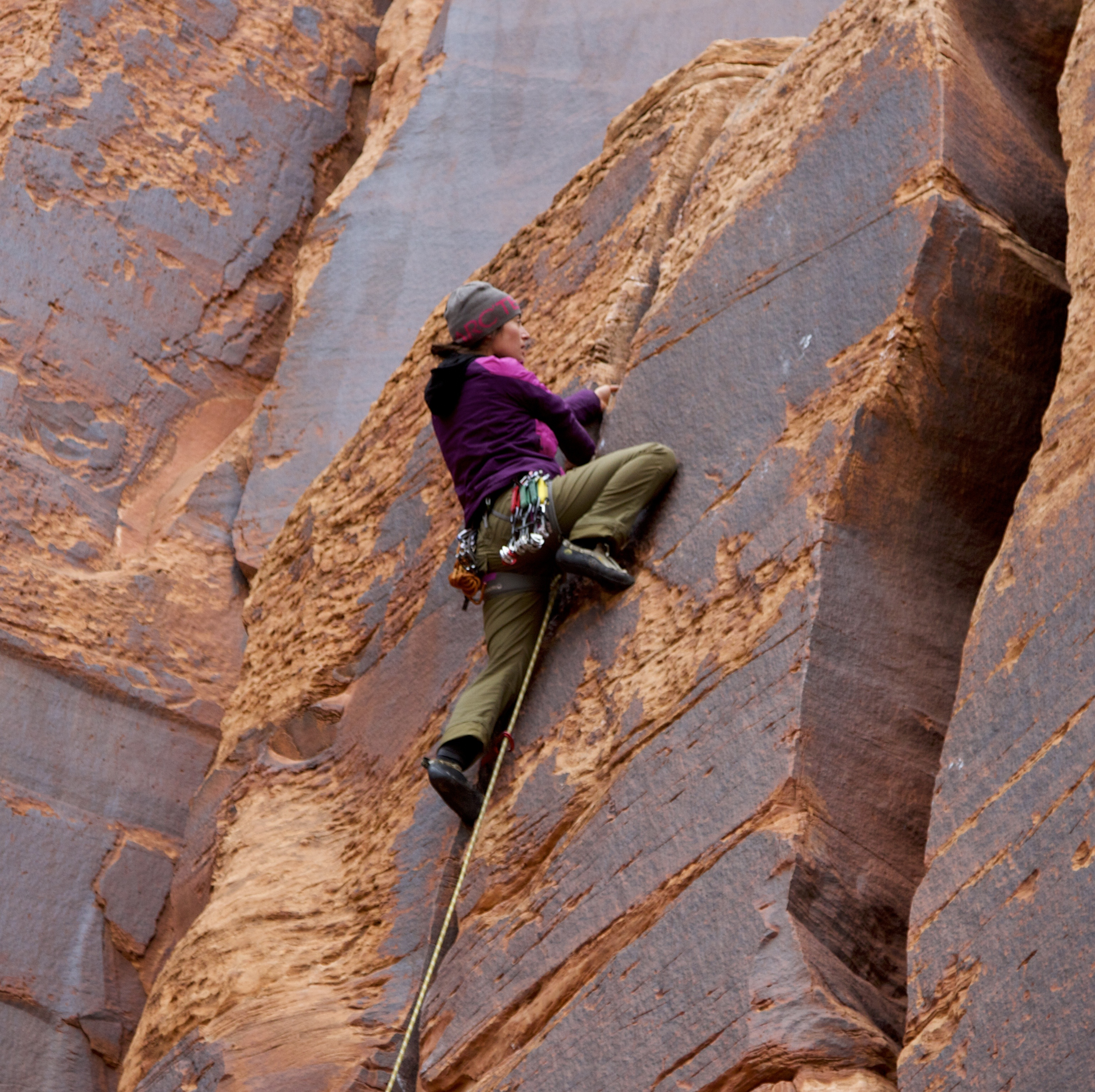

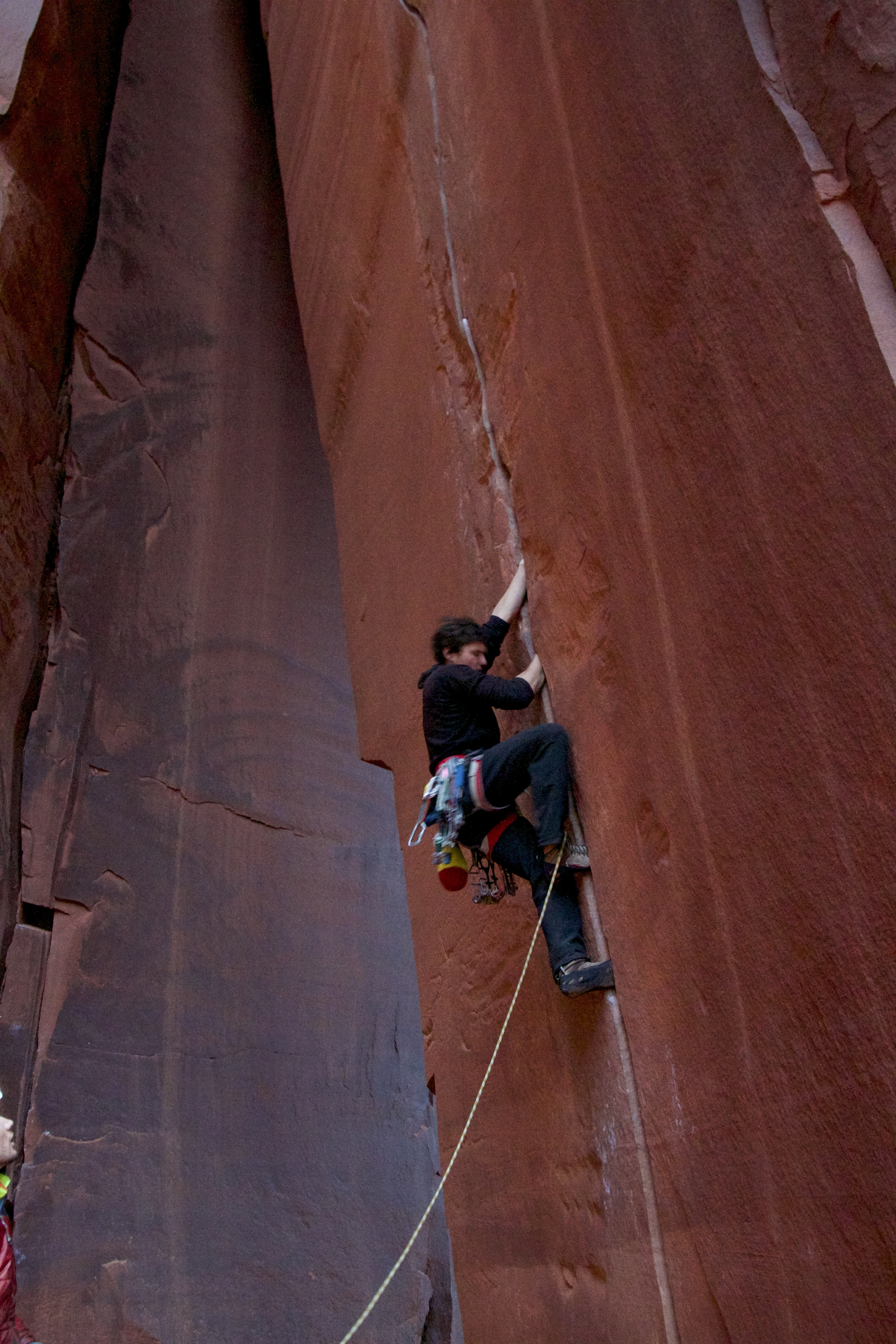

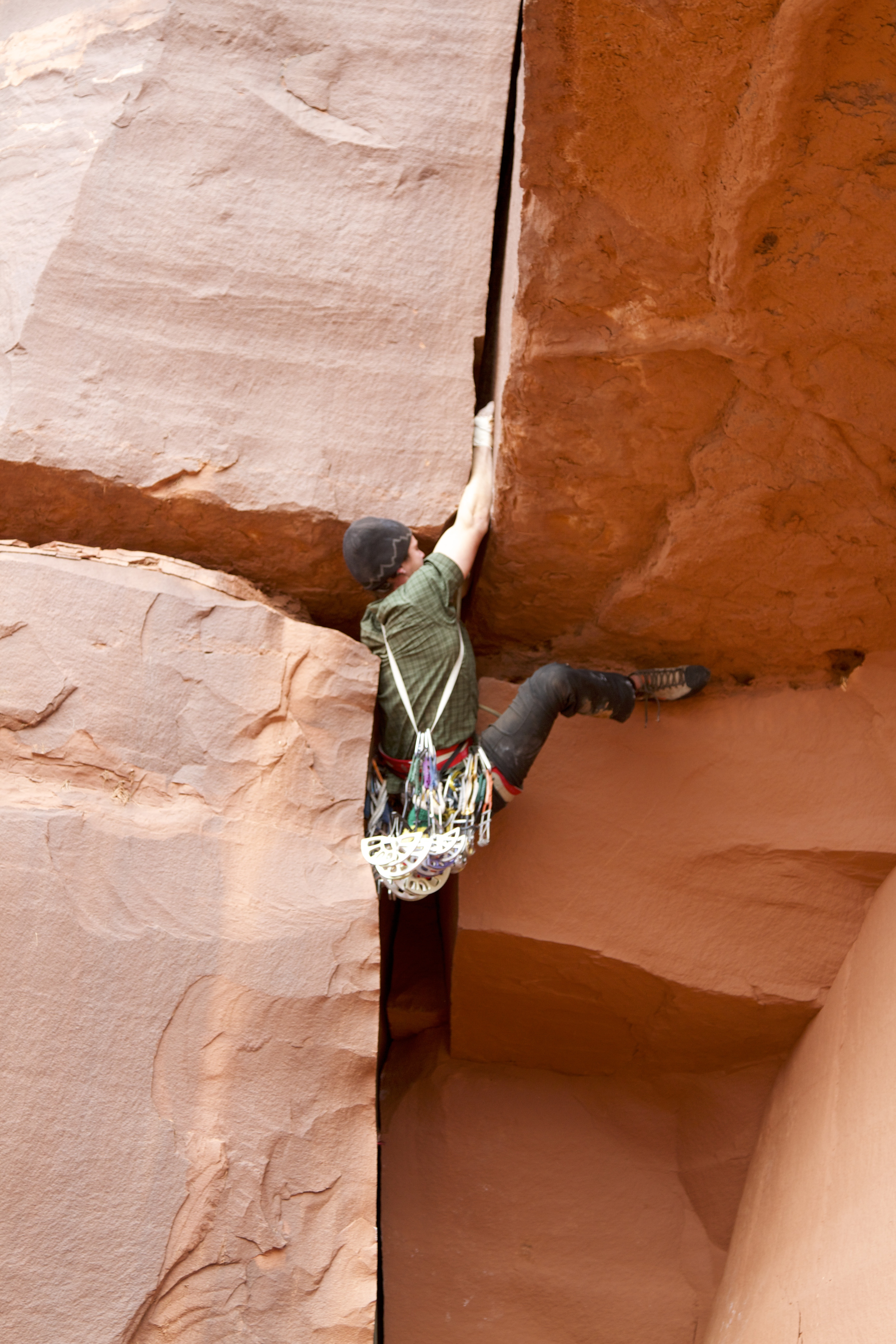

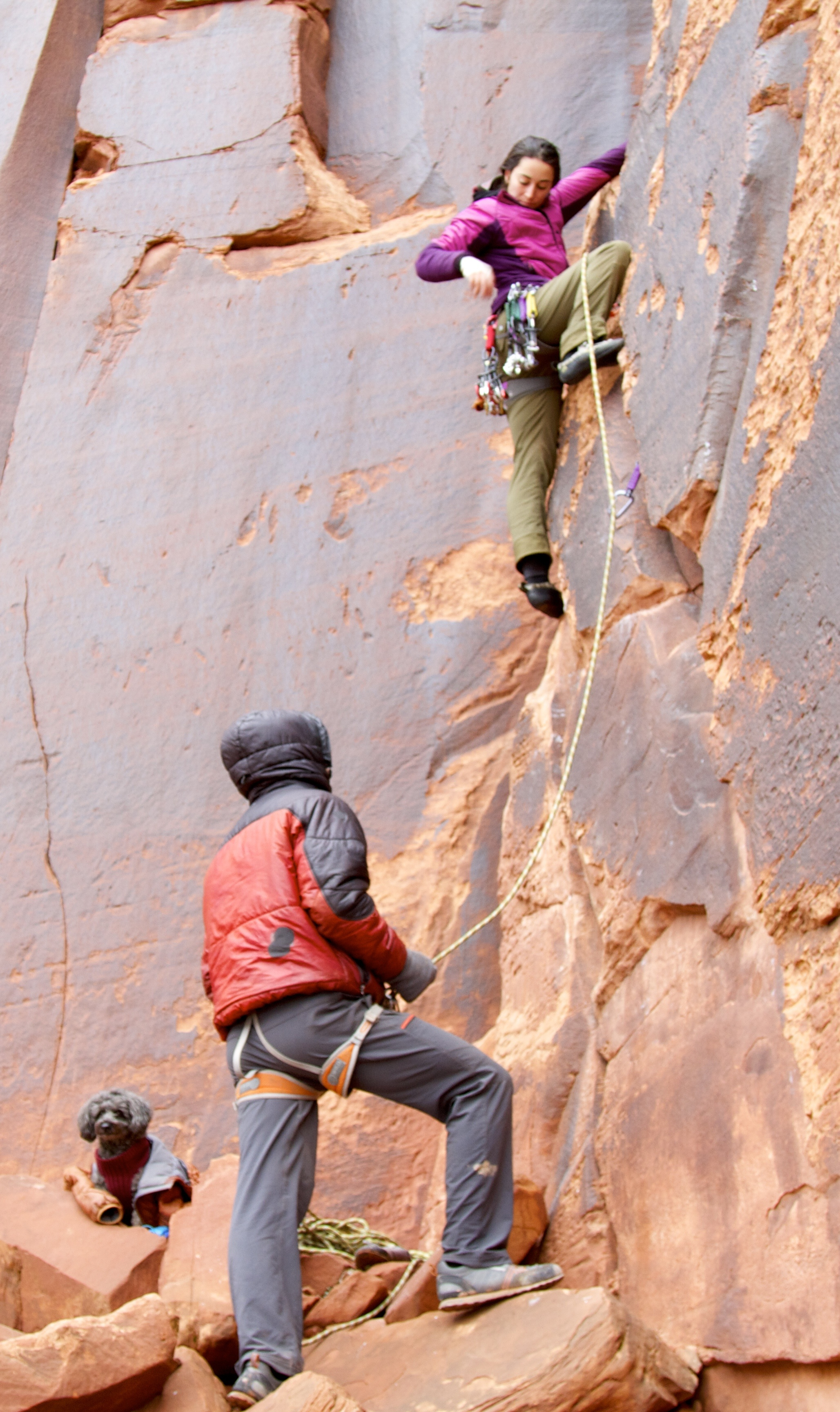

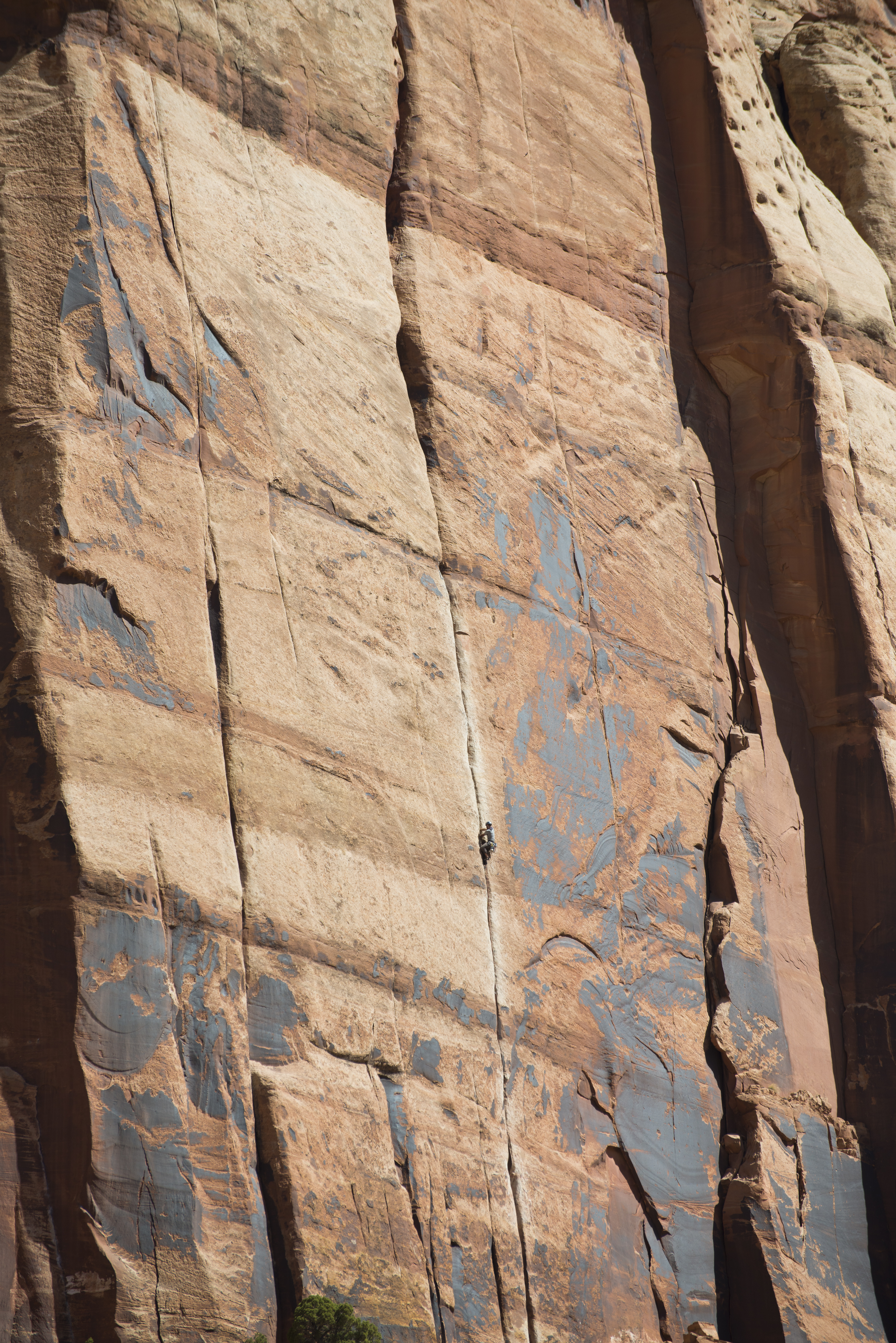

== See also ==
- Bridger Jack Butte
- Sixshooter Peaks
