= Wayne Lawrence =

Wayne Lawrence (born 1974) is a documentary photographer. He is based in Brooklyn, New York.

== Early life and education ==
Lawrence was born in St. Kitts. His first visit to New York was when he was 16 years old. He then moved west and worked as a commercial carpenter. He attended Brooks Institute, Santa Barbara.

== Work ==
He is known for his photographic series called Orchard Beach: The Bronx Riviera and Black Orthodox.

== Publications ==
- Orchard Beach: The Bronx Riviera. Prestel, 2013.

== Awards ==
- 2010: selected by Photo District News as one of its 30 photographers to watch
- 2012: International Photography Awards
- 2012: American Photography Annual
- 2013: American Photography Annual
- 2013: Arnold Newman Prize for New Directions in Portraiture
- 2013: Aaron Siskind Foundation Individual Photographer's Fellowship
