= Mark Synnott =

American rock climber

Mark Synnott is an American professional rock climber and author. He is an internationally certified mountain guide and member of The North Face athlete team. Synnott specializes in remote first ascents of big-wall climbs.

== Books ==
Synnott has climbed frequently with fellow The North Face athlete Alex Honnold, who is famous for free solo climbing El Capitan in 2017. Honnold's daring ascent inspired Synnott's best-selling book The Impossible Climb, a part memoir, part historical account of climbing history and the ground-breaking first free solo of El Capitan.

In 2021, Synnott published The Third Pole, documenting his 2019 expedition with Renan Ozturk to search for the body of Sandy Irvine on Mount Everest.

== Climbing ==
Synnott is known for groundbreaking first ascents around the world. He often documents these trips for National Geographic and The North Face. One such first ascent was climbing Mount Weiassipu, Guyana on an expedition where he led a team of climbers including Alex Honnold to the top of the tepui to help Dr Bruce Means find new species of frogs. Their journey was documented in Explorer: The Last Tepui by National Geographic and was released on Disney+ on Friday 22 April 2022.
