= Christopher Payne (photographer) =

American photographer

- Payne speaking in 2026
- Born: 1968 (age 57–58)
- Education: Columbia University (BA); University of Pennsylvania (M.Arch)
- Occupation: Architectural photographer

Christopher Payne (born 1968) is an American photographer who specializes in industrial and architectural photography.

== Early life and education ==
Payne originally trained as an architect, receiving his B.A. from Columbia University in 1990 and M.Arch from the University of Pennsylvania in 1996.

== Career ==
He has worked for Centerbrook Architects, Fisher Marantz Renfro Stone, and Weiss Manfredi.

Payne's interest in photography was first sparked while producing measured drawings of industrial buildings for the Historic American Engineering Record (HAER). HAER, an ongoing program of the National Park Service since 1969, was created to record the US's engineering and industrial heritage. The experience instilled in him a deep appreciation for industrial architecture. HAER photographers took pictures to complement the draftsmen's drawings, and Payne was struck at their ability to elevate the structures into a new art form–to transform the banal into something beautiful.

== Books ==
Payne's first book, New York's Forgotten Substations: The Power Behind the Subway (Princeton Architectural Press, 2002), was initially envisioned as a collection of detailed drawings similar to those he had created for HAER. But he rarely had time to finish his drawings on site, so he began taking photographs to work from later at home. Over time these snapshots became more complex, and the realization that he enjoyed the planning, preparing, and taking the pictures more than he did the drawings was a turning point in his career. New York's Forgotten Substations was published as a book of his photographs.

A year after his full-time move to photography in 2008, he published Asylum: Inside the Closed World of State Mental Hospitals (MIT Press, 2009), which includes a foreword by renowned neurologist Oliver Sacks. To chronicle these spaces, Payne visited 70 facilities in 30 states over seven years, most completely abandoned but a few still in operation. North Brother Island: The Last Unknown Place in New York City (MIT Press, 2014) was a continuation of the asylum project. A 20-acre island of ruins in the East River, the island has a complex history–explained in the book through essays by University of Pennsylvania preservationist Randall Mason and writer Robert Sullivan–having at various times served as a quarantine hospital, veteran accommodation, adolescent drug treatment center, and now a wildlife sanctuary for the Black Crowned Night Heron. Payne visited the island about thirty times, recording its seasonal and temporal changes.

In his two books, Making Steinway: Photographs by Christopher Payne (Philidor Company, 2016), and Made in America: The Industrial Photography of Christopher Payne (Abrams, 2023), Payne has shifted away from his previous interest in disused architectural spaces to focus on active small- and large-scale industrial spaces and the people who work there. Steinway pianos have been made in much the same way for over 150 years, and Payne's photographs, captured over a period of years, document the craftsmanship behind every aspect of these fine musical instruments. For Made in America he traveled the country documenting American manufacturing at all scales, from microchips to container ships. Collectively, the photographs offer a snapshot of American manufacturing today, from old factories surviving by catering to a niche clientele that values the handmade object to just-built factories for the production of microchips and electric vehicles.

While some of Payne's photography projects are driven by personal interests, others are commissioned by publications like the New York Times Magazine, National Geographic, Popular Science, The New Yorker, and Wired, on subjects ranging from jellybeans and cardboard to Airbus airplanes and vaccine vials.

== Awards ==
Payne has been awarded grants from the Graham Foundation, the New York State Council on the Arts, and the New York Foundation for the Arts.

== Representations and showings ==
He is represented by the Benrubi Gallery and works with the commercial photography agency Esto, founded by Ezra Stoller. His work has been exhibited across the US and Europe, in institutions such as the Wellcome Collection in London, the New York Transit Museum and the Cooper Hewitt, Smithsonian Design Museum in New York, and the Kennedy Museum of Art in Ohio.
