= Robert Kunzig =

Scientific journalist

Robert Kunzig is a scientific journalist, specializing in oceanography. He works at the European division of Discover magazine and is a regular contributor to National Geographic.

== Journalism ==
Kunzig's writings led him to win a prize in scientific journalism from the American Association for the Advancement of Science, Woods Hole Oceanographic Institution. He received the American Geophysical Union's "Walter Sullivan Award for Excellence in Science Journalism" in 1994. His book, Mapping the Deep, a narrative of the story of ocean science, won the 2001 Aventis Science Book of the Year award.

He has co-written an account of climate science with the geophysicist and climate scientist, Wallace Broecker. This includes a discussion of the work of Klaus Lackner in re-capturing CO_{2} from the atmosphere—which Kunzig and Broecker consider will play a vital role in reducing emissions and countering global warming. Most recently, he has also written on the size and impact of the human population on the planet.

== Books ==
- The Restless Sea; 1999.
- Mapping the Deep; 2000. Awarded the 2001 Aventis Prize for Science Books)
- Fixing Climate: The Story of Climate Science - and How To Stop Global Warming; 2008 (with Wallace Broecker])

== Articles ==
- Kunzig, Robert (March 2009). "The Canadian Oil Boom: Scraping Bottom". National Geographic Magazine. 215 (3): 38–59. Archived from the original on February 19, 2009.
- Seven Billion: at National Geographic; retrieved .
