= Church Rock =

Church Rock may refer to the following:

- Church Rock, Antarctica, a steeple-like rock in Corinthian Bay

In the United States

- Church Rock (Arizona), a rock pillar in Navajo County
- Church Rock (Barnstable County, Massachusetts), an island of Massachusetts
- Church Rock (Bristol County, Massachusetts), an island of Massachusetts
- Church Rock, New Mexico, a census-designated place
  - Church Rock uranium mill spill, in Church Rock, New Mexico, 1979
- Church Rock (Utah), a column of sandstone in San Juan County
