= East Canyon =

East Canyon may refer to:

- East Canyon (Wasatch Range), located northeast of Salt Lake City, Utah and is the site of the East Canyon State Park
- East Canyon (San Juan County, Utah), located a few miles east of Church Rock (Utah)
