= Home of Truth, Utah =

Home of Truth
- Ghost town
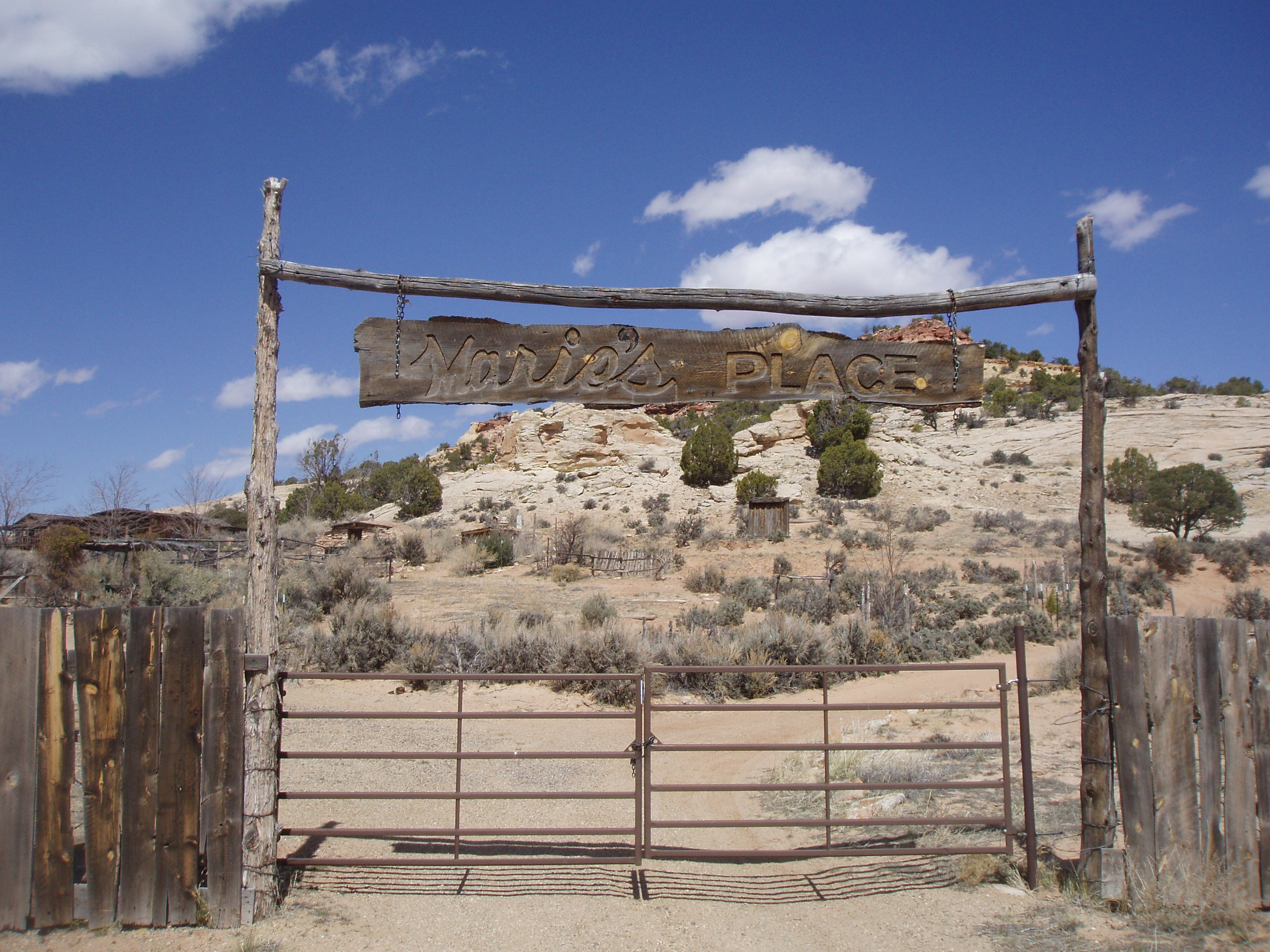
- Entrance to the "Inner Portal"

- Location within Utah Location within the United States
- Coordinates: 38°03′40″N 109°23′02″W
- Country: United States
- State: Utah
- County: San Juan
- Established: 1933
- Abandoned: 1937, empty 1977

Home of Truth is a ghost town located in San Juan County, Utah. The settlement was a short-lived utopian religious intentional community in the 1930s led by spiritualist Marie Ogden. The Home of Truth started in 1933 with an initial population of 22 people and grew to around 100 at its peak.

During its brief history, the town was isolated from the surrounding community socially as well as physically, its residents keeping to themselves in a strict, simple lifestyle. Ogden took over the local newspaper and used it to introduce outsiders to her beliefs. The crisis that led to the downfall of the Home of Truth resulted from her writings about efforts to raise a woman from the dead. The investigations by local authorities and the intense media attention that followed drove most of the members to abandon the group by the end of 1937. A handful of residents continued to occupy Home of Truth until 1977.

Today the empty buildings at Home of Truth lie on fenced private land along Utah State Route 211, seen mainly by visitors to the Needles district of Canyonlands National Park.

== Location ==
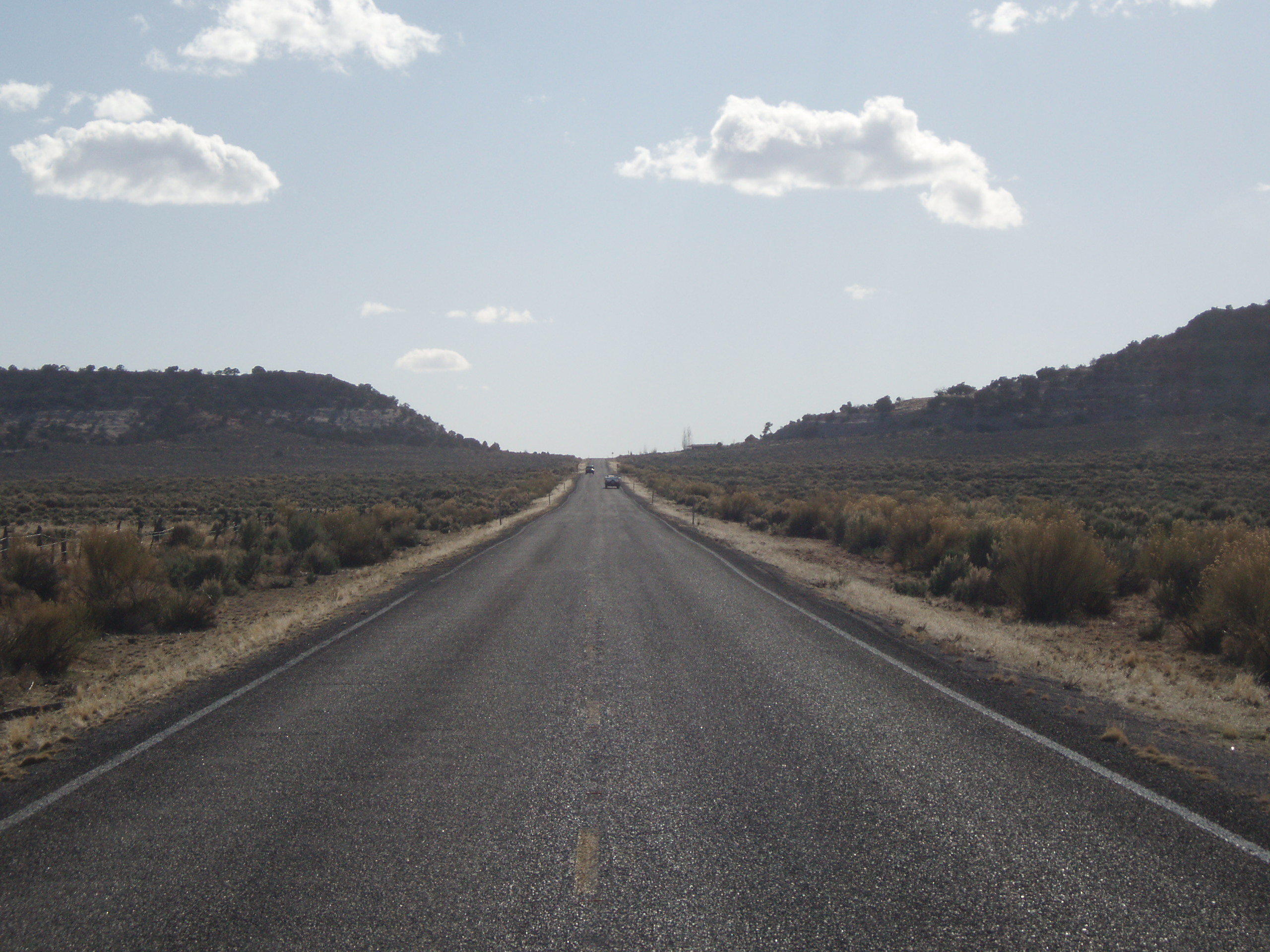
Photograph Gap

The site of Home of Truth lies approximately 15 miles (24 km) north of Monticello, and some 3 miles (4.8 km) west of Church Rock. The settlement was spread out along Dry Valley, bounded on the north and south by irregular mountain ridges that come close together at the western end, in a place called Photograph Gap. In the image to the left, the "Inner Portal" is on the horizon just to the right of the road.

Utah State Route 211, the road to Newspaper Rock and the entrance to the Needles district of Canyonlands National Park, passes through the site.

== History ==
=== Foundation ===
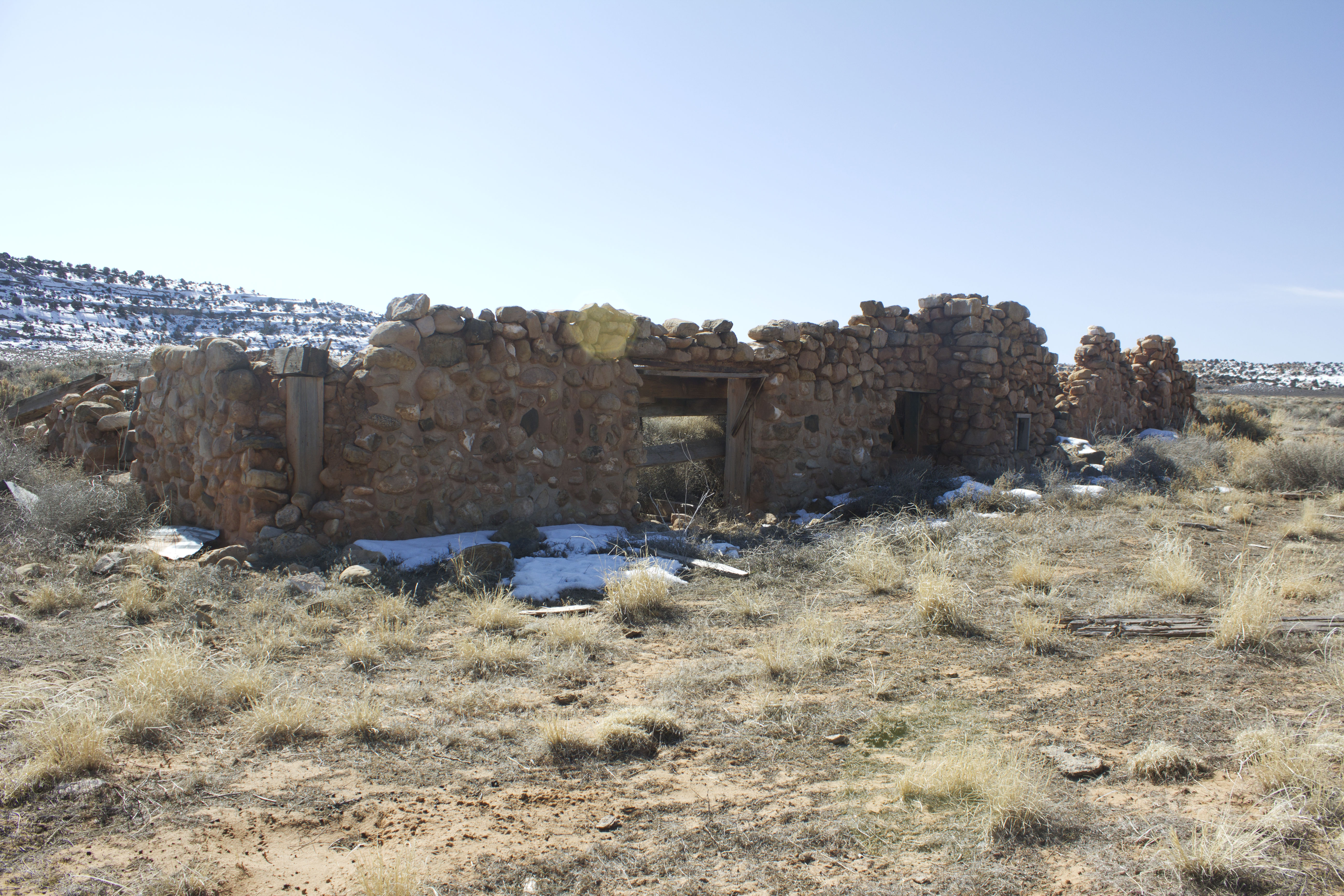
Unfinished chapel at the Middle Portal

Marie Ogden (May 31, 1883 – March 4, 1975) was a wealthy, well-educated widow from Newark, New Jersey. She was prominent and active in community affairs, working for the welfare of the poor and rising to the presidency of the New Jersey State Federation of Women's Clubs. After the death of her husband, Harry Ogden, in 1929, she sought comfort in spiritualism, soon forming an occult group called the School of Truth. Ogden was attracted to the idea that spiritualism could allow her to communicate with her dead husband and learn why he died, as well as to find the answers to life for herself. She briefly joined the early "League of the Liberators" organization of spiritualist William Dudley Pelley, whose esoteric spiritual experiences and millennialist teachings resonated with her. In 1932 she became the largest single financial contributor to Pelley's movement, but she parted ways with him over his developing political extremism. Claiming to receive divine revelations through automatic writing on her typewriter, Ogden toured the country lecturing and gathering followers.

While on her lecture tour in Boise, Idaho, Ogden announced a revelation directing her to establish a religious colony dedicated to "the truth". She returned to New Jersey with no idea of a location for the project, but was convinced it must be in a wilderness area far from city life. Ogden explained that she had received "a description and a mental picture of the place and knew it was on virgin soil, far removed from city life," as well as in the "intermountain country." Through friends she learned of available land in San Juan County, Utah, and after visiting the area she made up her mind. She claimed that the location of their commune matched her vision. A group of 21 disciples, mostly from the Boise area, followed her to Dry Valley in southeastern Utah in September 1933. Intending to start a collective farm, the group first tried to buy some irrigated ranch land on Indian Creek, but they could not pay the asking price. Ogden offered the owner membership in the colony and a guarantee of eternal life, but to no avail. They settled on a tract of barren desert near Church Rock—the site, according to Ogden, of Christ's Second Coming—and began to build the Home of Truth.

The Home of Truth was constructed in three sections spread a few miles apart from east to west. The Outer Portal was made up of several buildings, including a communal house and dormitory. The Middle Portal, largest of the three, was planned to include a chapel made of cobblestones, although the foundation was never finished. The Inner Portal contained barracks and six houses. Marie Ogden taught that the Inner Portal, where she lived with her daughter Roberta, was located on the exact center of the Earth's axis, and that only those who lived here would be spared the coming calamities of the last days. There were at least 23 buildings scattered throughout Home of Truth, most with simple exteriors of unpainted board and batten or tar paper shingles.

=== Colony life ===
Residents agreed to a strict code of conduct. They surrendered all personal possessions to the group, which provided food, clothing, and shelter. The rules also forbade consumption of alcohol and tobacco. Although the colony raised chickens in the beginning, eating any meat except fish was later prohibited. Ogden even said they must stop planting gardens, but they were still permitted to hire out as laborers to local farmers. Ogden received instructions for the settlement through her typewriter as well as in revelatory trips to the top of nearby Shay Mountain. She taught from the Aquarian Gospel and other theosophical works. Her doctrines included reincarnation, communication with the dead, and asceticism. It is said that she claimed to be the reincarnated Virgin Mary, identifying other group members as reincarnations of Brigham Young and the prophet Nathan. However, this was only reported by newspapers and never verified by credible sources from within the commune. Ogden also handled the colony's financial matters. In 1934, she purchased the local newspaper, the San Juan Record, made herself editor, and added a column in which she promoted her metaphysical ideas. In her first column of “Metaphysical Truths”, printed May 24, 1934, she describes metaphysics as "that division of philosophy which relates to the science of being and to the hidden, or unseen things, which pertain to our spiritual rather than our material, or physical being which we KNOW because we are more conscious of the physical senses we have allowed to predominate. It also embraces that which tells you how the Universe came to being, what composes the Universe, and how life started to manifest on it. As one writer states: 'It's the science of exploring the Universe outside of the Finite.'" Additionally, a column called the “Dry Valley News” gave a summary of the goings-on at Home of Truth. She also used the press to print pamphlets about her beliefs to distribute.

All group members were expected to work in common for the settlement. The women did domestic chores, while the men worked the farm and did some prospecting for gold, on a small scale and without much success. Water was scarce, but they installed a windmill-driven water pump and concrete cisterns for irrigating their fields. Members constructed the buildings themselves. There was no electricity or indoor plumbing, consistent with their belief in material simplicity. They also made their own furniture and household goods by hand, supplemented by Ogden's occasional shopping trips to Monticello. Despite this spartan existence, the colony continually added new members, the population growing to around 100 at its height in 1934–5.

=== Raising the dead ===
In the beginning, the sect's mostly Mormon neighbors took little notice of the newcomers, generally tolerant of their unorthodox beliefs. Then on February 11, 1935, a member of the group named Edith Peshak died of cancer. She and her husband had joined in search of a promised spiritual cure for her disease. Marie Ogden claimed that Peshak was in a state of "purification" and could soon be brought back to life. On April 4, 1935, her newspaper column included a section entitled "The Rebirth of a Soul", which detailed Ogden's conversations with the dead woman and her beliefs about raising her from the dead. Ogden still had the corpse, which was being washed three times a day in a salt solution and "fed" milk and eggs by injection. Rumors spread through the Monticello area, and at last the county sheriff came to Home of Truth in June 1935 to investigate the stories. The authorities found Peshak's body well preserved. They decided to allow the colony to keep it, as they determined it was no health threat, and since a number of people in the area had old Native American mummies found in dry caves.

=== Decline and closure ===
Over the next two years, as the press continued to publish sensationalized accounts of the events depicting the Home of Truth as a dangerous cult, more than half of the colonists left, disillusioned. In February 1937, Marie Ogden made another announcement that Edith Peshak was about to be restored to life. The investigators returned, insisting that a death certificate must be signed. Ogden continued to claim the woman was not actually dead. After being arrested, Ogden consented to sign the certificate on May 4, 1937, but the authorities still could not find the body. Finally, a former member came forward and confessed to having helped her cremate the corpse shortly after the original investigation, in August 1935. All but seven of Ogden's remaining followers abandoned Home of Truth.

== Aftermath ==
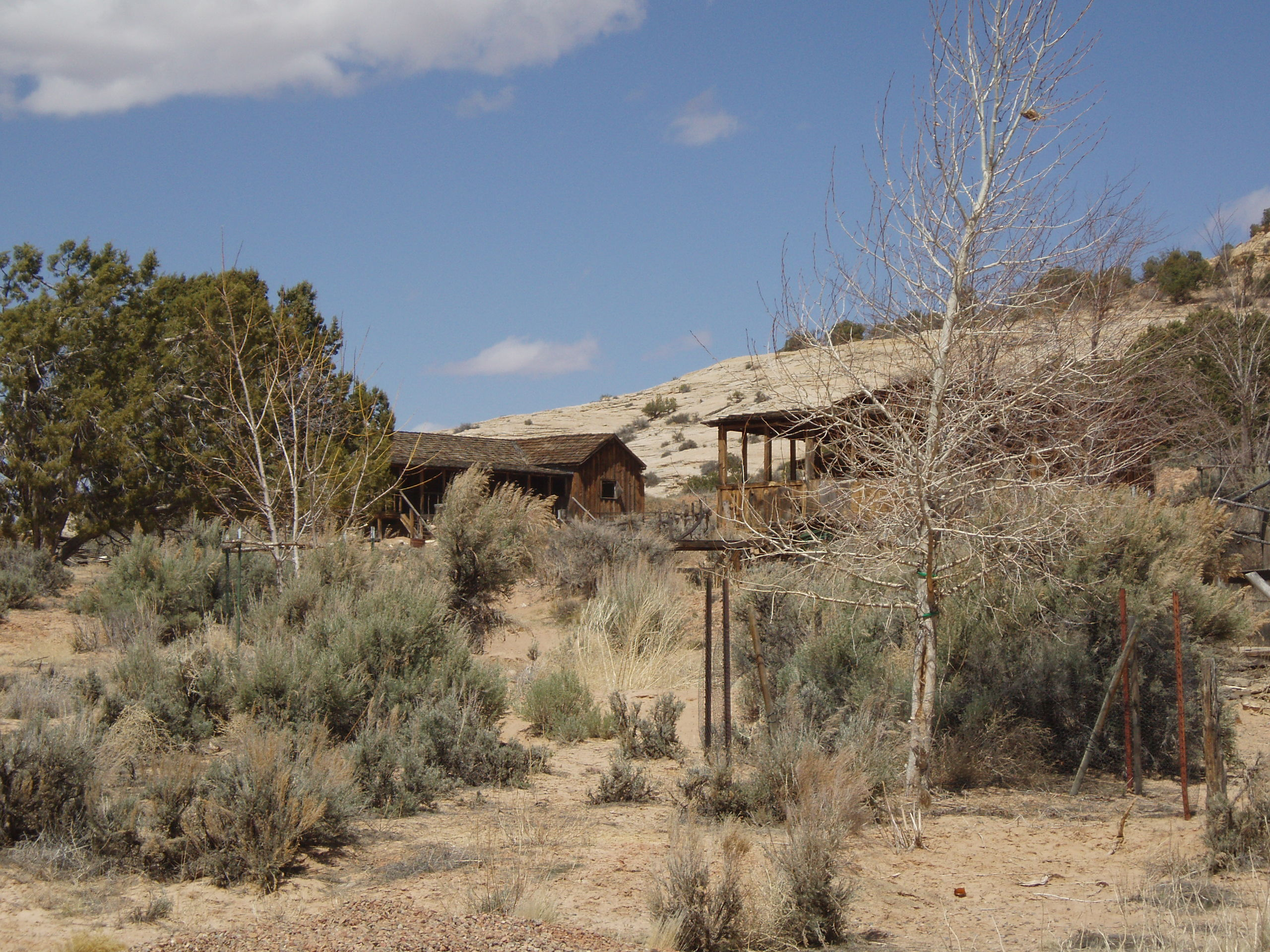
Inner Portal buildings

Left nearly alone, Marie Ogden continued to support herself by publishing the newspaper and by teaching piano lessons to the children of Monticello. In 1949, Ogden sold The San Juan Record. She eventually moved into the San Juan Nursing Home in Blanding, where she died in 1975. The Home of Truth property was privately sold in the 1970s to prevent the government from seizing it to pay for Ogden's care. Her personal papers and guest register were destroyed just before the sale. A few of her followers continued to live at Home of Truth until September 30, 1977, when the new owners sold the remaining contents of the Inner Portal at auction. All three Portals still held locked, dusty buildings, maintained by a caretaker and surrounded by "No Trespassing" signs.

As of 2008 there is nothing left of the Outer Portal, but buildings still stand at the other two. The property owner has worked to preserve the Inner Portal, and has announced plans to allow public tours once the site is restored. Both remaining Portals are fenced off from the road, and a sign reading "Marie's Place" hangs over the gate to the Inner Portal, on a ridge just north of State Route 211. A small cemetery holds five graves.
