= Utah State Route 211 =

State highway in San Juan County, Utah, U.S.

State Route 211
- SR 211 highlighted in red

Route information
- Maintained by UDOT
- Length: 18.915 mi (30.441 km)
- Existed: 1971–present

Major junctions
- West end: Dugout Ranch
- East end: US 191 near Church Rock

Location
- Country: United States
- State: Utah

Highway system
- Utah State Highway System; Interstate; US; State; Minor; Scenic
← SR-210	→ I-215

State Route 211 is a state route in Utah that is an access road for Newspaper Rock State Historic Monument and the Needles district of Canyonlands National Park. The entire length of the highway has been designated the Indian Creek Corridor Scenic Byway.

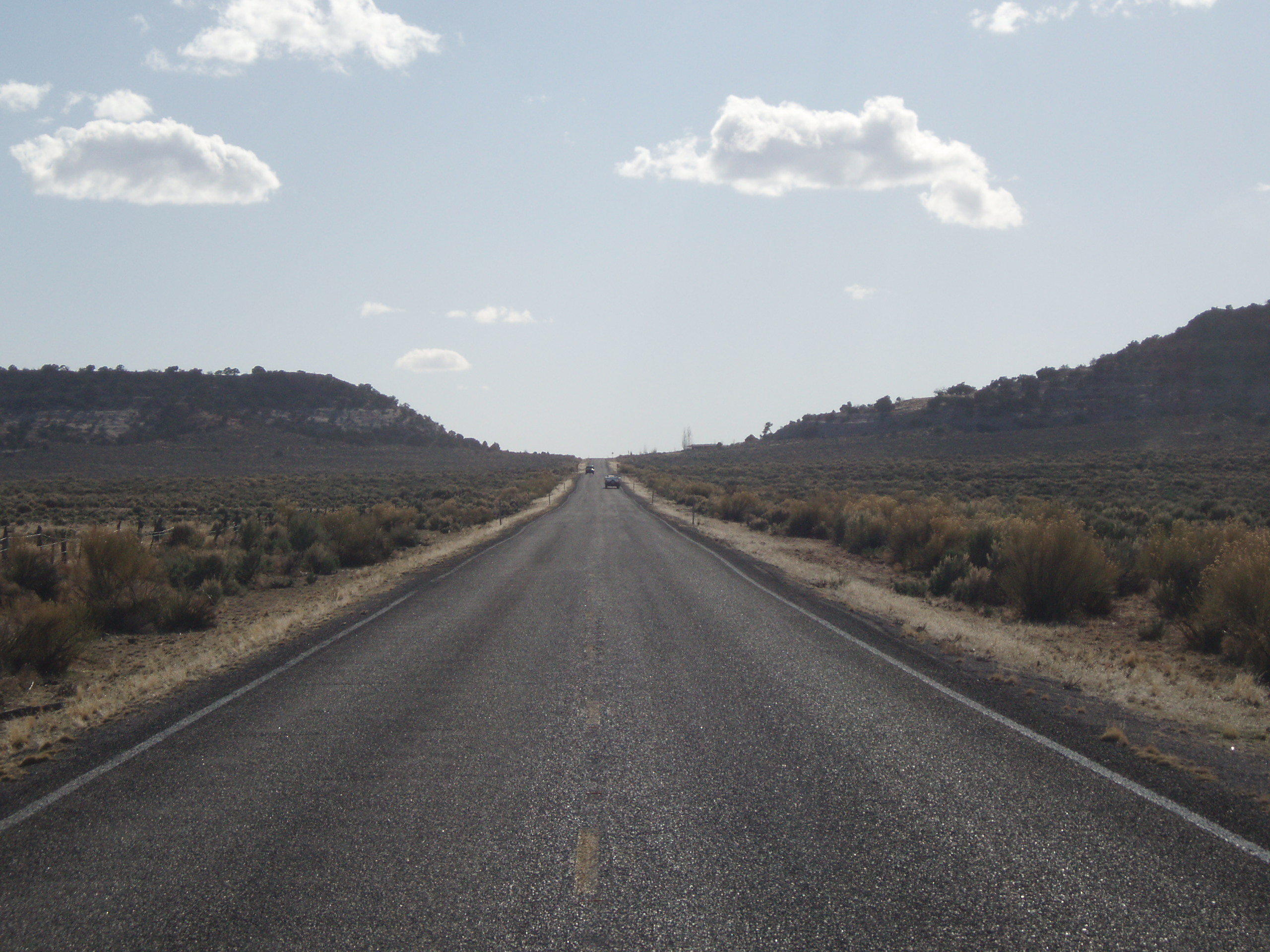
Route 211 runs west to Photograph Gap

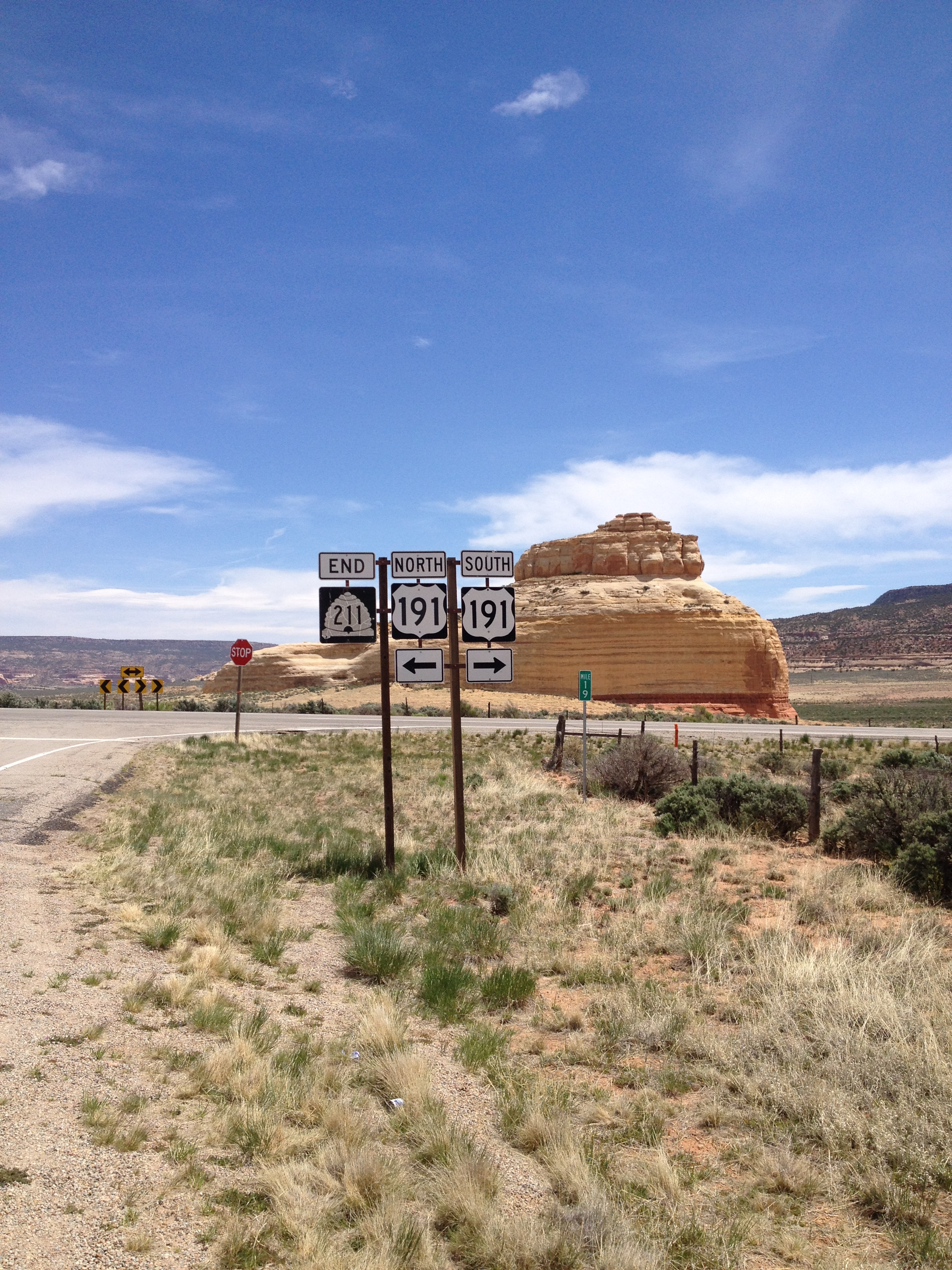
US 191 & Utah Route 211 Markers

== Route description ==
The highway begins near Church Rock, a notable rock formation along U.S. Route 191 between Moab and Monticello. It runs past the ruins of the utopian religious community called Home of Truth, and through Photograph Gap. The highway then descends Indian Canyon. Once exiting the canyon the highway passes by Newspaper Rock, directly off the shoulder of the highway. The highway also passes by Sixshooter Peaks, notable peaks near the entrance to Canyonlands National Park. The highway ends at Dugout Ranch just shy of the National Park boundary.

The descent down Indian Canyon between US-191 and Newspaper Rock features a steep descent and sharp curves. As a result, the Utah Department of Transportation mandates that all vehicles using Route 211 that exceed 10 feet (3.0 m) in width or 80 feet (24 m) in length have an accompanying pilot car escort.

== History ==
In 1968, the Utah State Road Commission came to an agreement with the National Park Service and San Juan County to improve the then-unpaved access road to the Needles district of Canyonlands National Park. The roadway left SR-9 (US-160, now US-191) near Church Rock and went southwest to near Newspaper Rock and northwest via Dugout Ranch to the park. SR-211 was deleted in 1969, but restored in 1971. After construction was complete, the portion between SR-9 and Dugout Ranch was designated SR-211. The rest from Dugout Ranch to the park boundary remained a county road.

Flooding caused by heavy rains destroyed a large part of the road on August 14, 2022. The road was reopened on September 26, 2022.

== Major intersections ==
The entire route is in San Juan County.

Location	mi	km	Destinations	Notes
	0.000	0.000	Federal Route 2444 – Canyonlands National Park	
Newspaper Rock State Historic Monument	5.912	9.514	Campgrounds	
Newspaper Rock State Historic Monument	6.607	10.633	Rest area	
Newspaper Rock State Historic Monument	6.681	10.752	Campgrounds	
	18.915	30.441	US 191 – Moab, Monticello	
1.000 mi = 1.609 km; 1.000 km = 0.621 mi
