= Church Rock (Utah) =

Column of sandstone in Utah, US

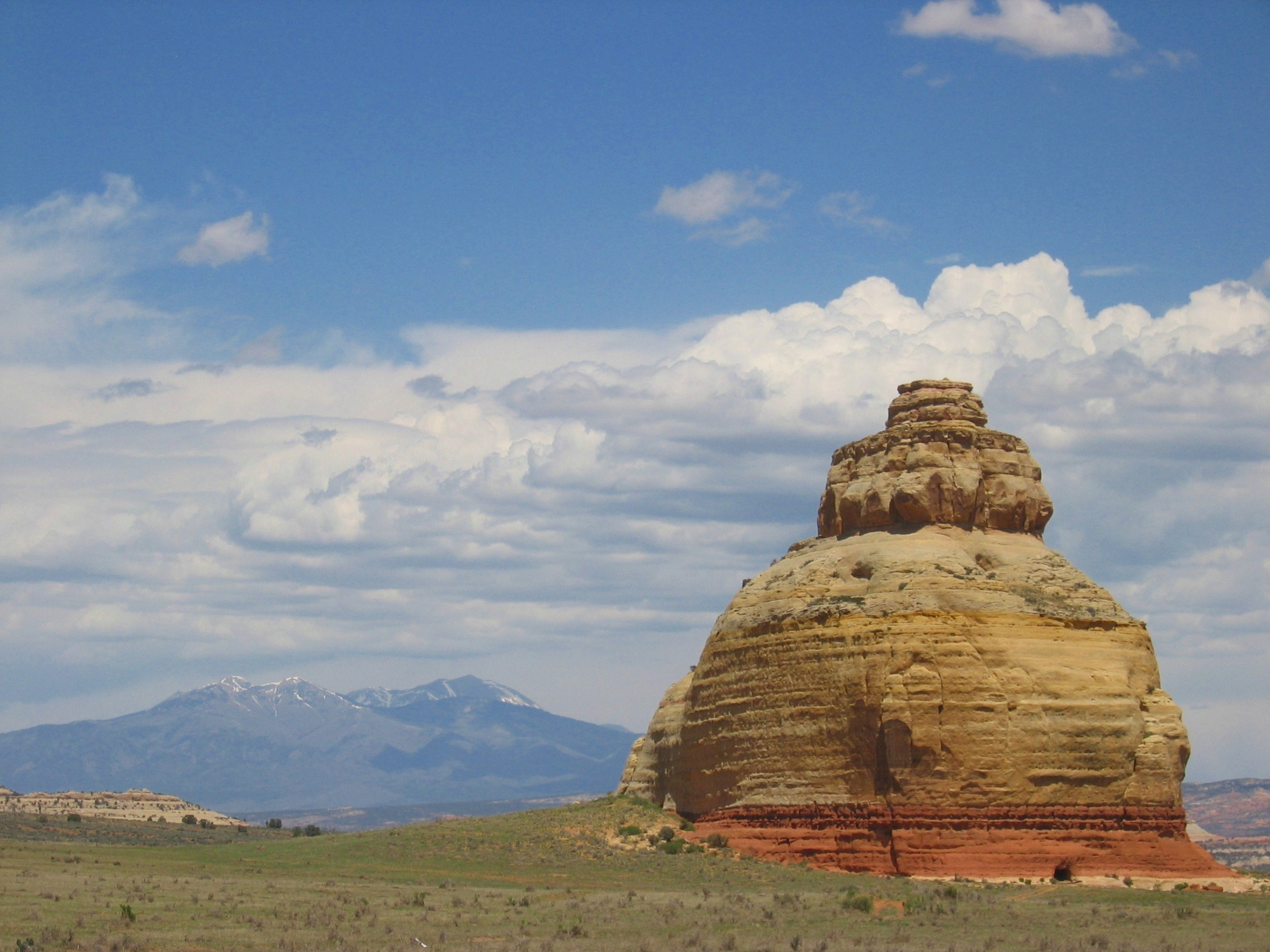
- View of the formation

- Location within Utah
- Location: Monticello, Utah
- Coordinates: 38.0739°N 109.3451°W
- Elevation: 7,025 ft (2,141 m)
- Governing body: National Park Service

Church Rock is a solitary column of sandstone in southern Utah along the eastern side of U.S. Route 191, near the entrance to the Needles District of Canyonlands National Park.

In the same area with the Colorado and Green River canyons and Canyonlands, this 200-foot roadside oddity near Monticello is called Church Rock. It seldom attracts more than a casual glance, as visitors head toward Newspaper Rock State Historic Monument and the Needles District or drive between Moab and Monticello.

One of the interesting pages of 1930s myths tells about Church Rock, and how the gumdrop shaped rock earned its name. The story is of how Marie Ogden's Home of the Truth, a Utopian community, was erroneously responsible. Ogden was a spiritualist during the 1920s, giving lectures across the U.S. on spiritualism, until she came to San Juan County, Utah. She allegedly called San Juan County and Church Rock "the spiritual center of the universe." With a small band of followers, Ogden's group moved onto a tract of barren land along Utah's Route 211 in 1933, calling it the "Home of Truth." Members turned all their worldly goods to Ogden to join her Home of Truth, abiding by a strict code of conduct, were expected to work for the common goals of the settlement. Women tended to the domestic chores and men worked the arid farm acreage. Not far from Church Rock are the remains of Ogden's ghost town. A few buildings and a small cemetery are all that remain of the Home of the Truth community, found on a ridge called Photograph Gap. After the community broke up, Ogden stayed in Monticello and became the owner and publisher of the community newspaper, The San Juan Record, in the 1940s. She died in the 1975 and is buried in Blanding.

The three-tiered sandstone rock is located not far from the Home of Truth, but is only one of several in the area (Sugarloaf and Turtle Rock among others). Part of the myth is that the group set upon a grand plan to hollow out the entire center of the sandstone monument, by hand, to build a church. In fact, the sandstone formation was owned by a local rancher, Claud Young of Monticello. Young owned about 2000 acres of land, for cattle range, before the highway came through the area known as Dry Valley.

The only evidence of the myth, and the apparent basis for the assumption of turning the rock into a 'church,' is the 16 by 24 foot opening chiseled into the rock. In fact, that 'opening' was contracted out by the owner, Claud Young. The opening was done through the use of dynamite and cut out of the stone during the late 1940s to store salt licks and feed for the cattle. The rock is still owned by the Young family, in equal shares by the two daughters and two sons of Claud and Inez Young, their surviving spouses, and/or surviving grandchildren owning their percentage of 'the rock.'

== See also ==
- Moab, Utah
- Utah State Route 211
- Church Rock (Arizona)
