= Church Rock, Antarctica =

Church Rock (53°2′S 73°26′E) is a dark, steeple-like rock, 16 m high, lying at the head of Corinthian Bay opposite the terminus of Baudissin Glacier, off the north side of Heard Island.

== History ==
Probably named after the American Captain Church of the schooner Mechanic, a tender to the Corinthian in captain Erasmus Darwin Rogers' sealing fleet that landed at Heard Island in 1855. The name appears in the reports of the British names then in use.

Several members of the Church family of Montville, CT are recorded as working in the area during this period.
