= Church Rock (Arizona) =

Pillar in Navajo County, Arizona, US

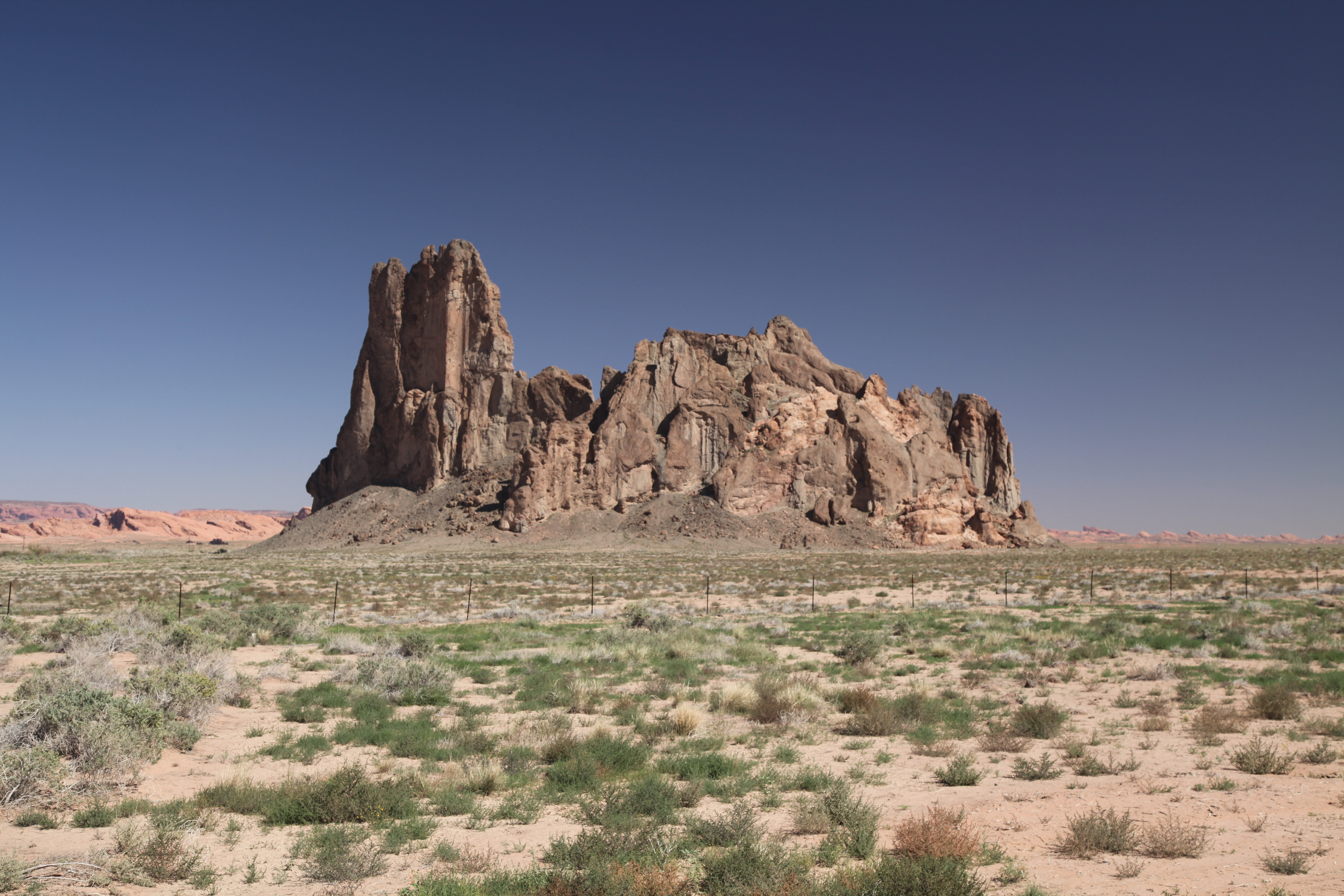
- Southwest aspect

Highest point
- Elevation: 5,862 ft (1,787 m) NGVD 29
- Prominence: 472 ft (144 m)
- Coordinates: 36°44′04″N 110°07′07″W

Geography
- Location within Arizona Location within the United States
- Location: Navajo County, Arizona, U.S.
- Topo map: USGS Church Rock

Geology
- Rock age: Oligocene
- Rock type: Volcanic breccia

Church Rock is a pillar in Navajo County, Arizona. It is located near the mouth of Church Rock Valley with a summit elevation of 5,862 feet (1,787 m). It is situated 7.5 miles (12.1 km) east of the community of Kayenta, on Navajo Nation land, and can be seen from Highway 160 as it rises 400 feet above Church Rock Valley. It is one of the eroded volcanic plugs, or diatremes, of the Navajo Volcanic Field, which is a volcanic field that includes intrusions and flows of minette and other unusual igneous rocks which formed around 30 million years ago during the Oligocene.

== History ==
Church Rock was originally named Artenesales de Piedra or Sculpted Rock, by the Mexican merchant and explorer Antonio Armijo in 1829–1830, when the area was explored by his expedition to find a trade route between Santa Fe de Nuevo México and Alta California. This would become the Armijo Route of the Old Spanish Trail.

== Gallery ==
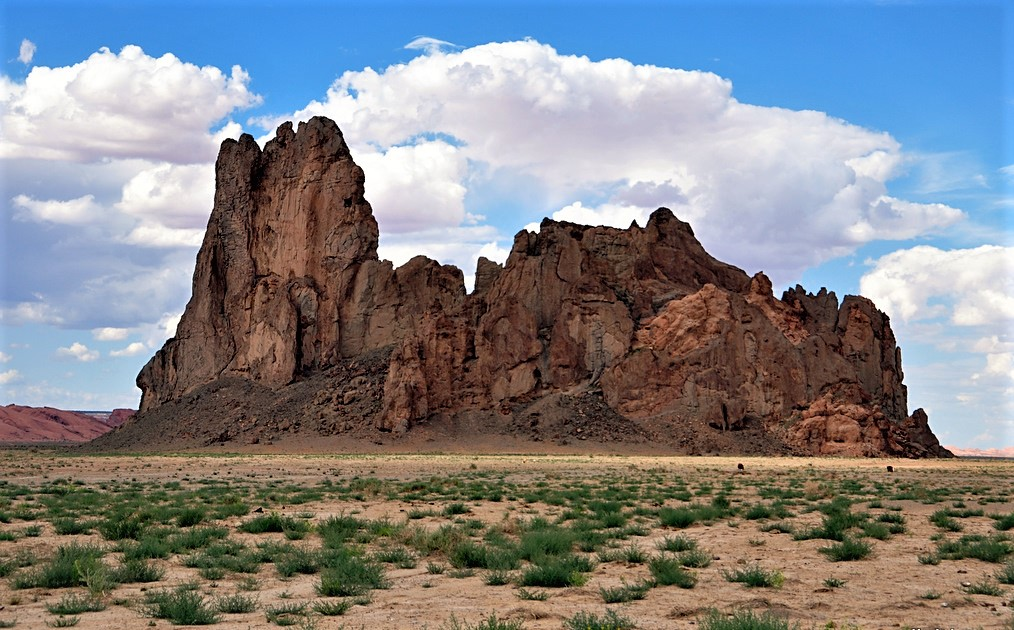
Southwest aspect

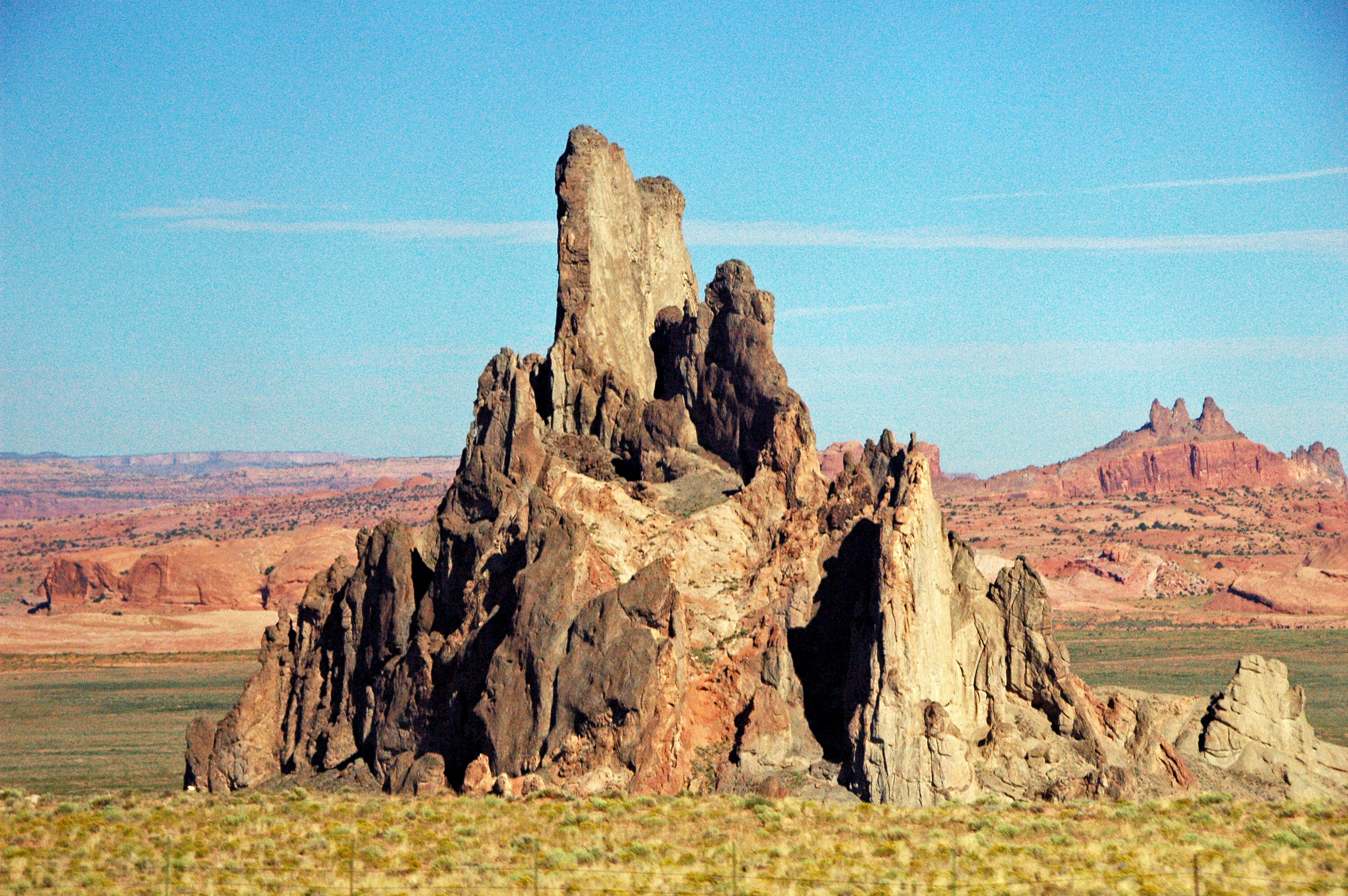
Southeast aspect

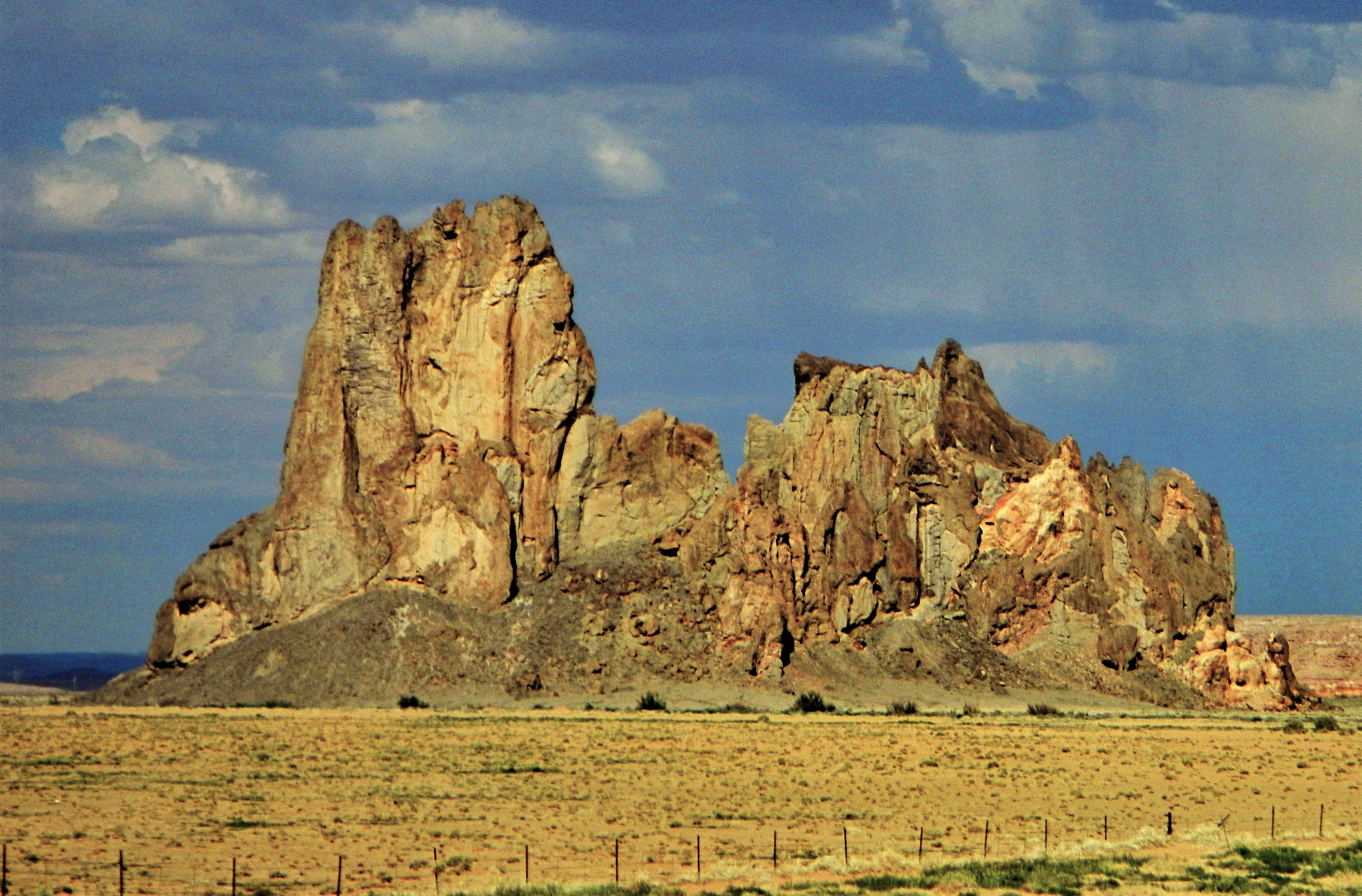

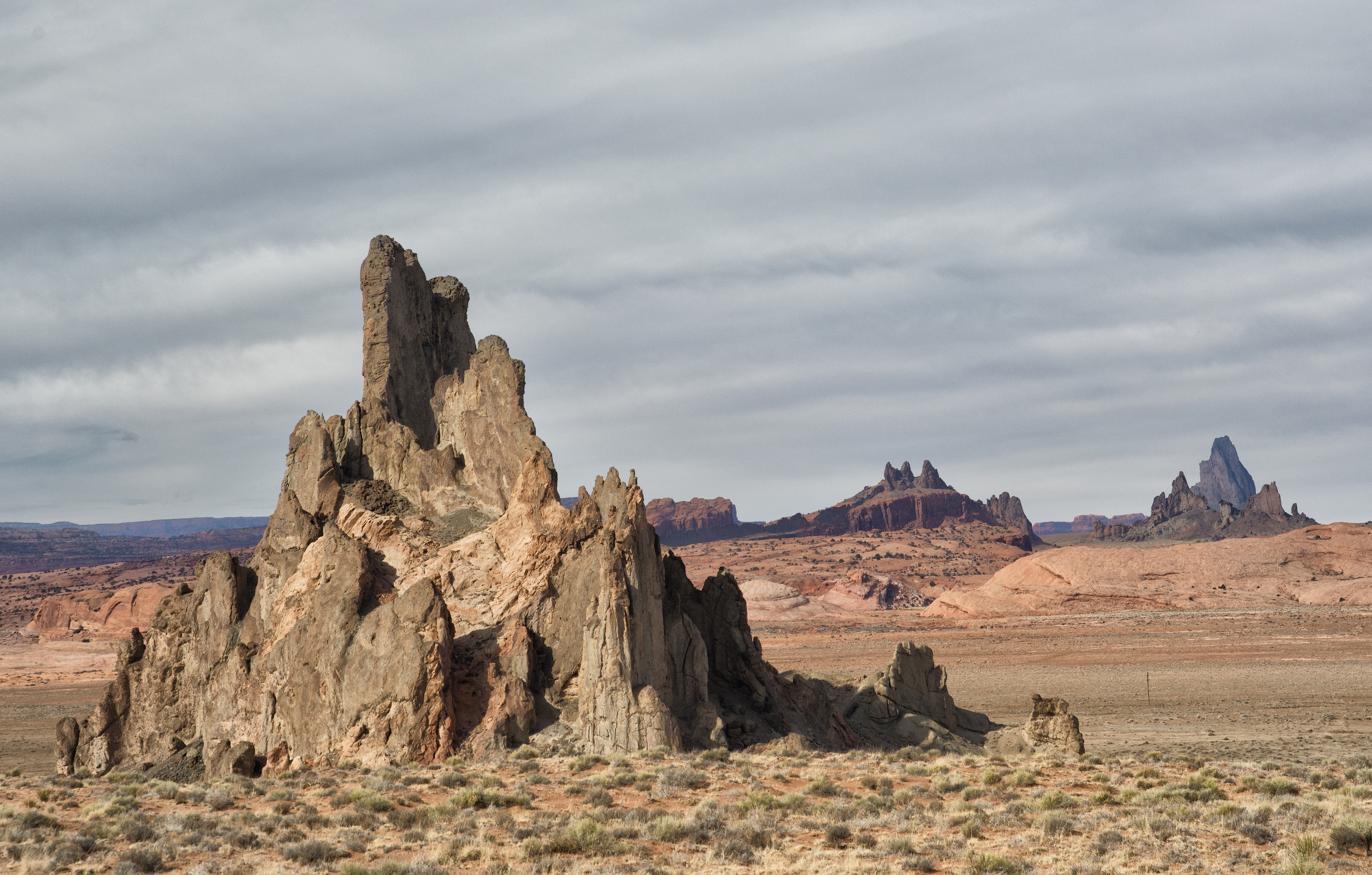

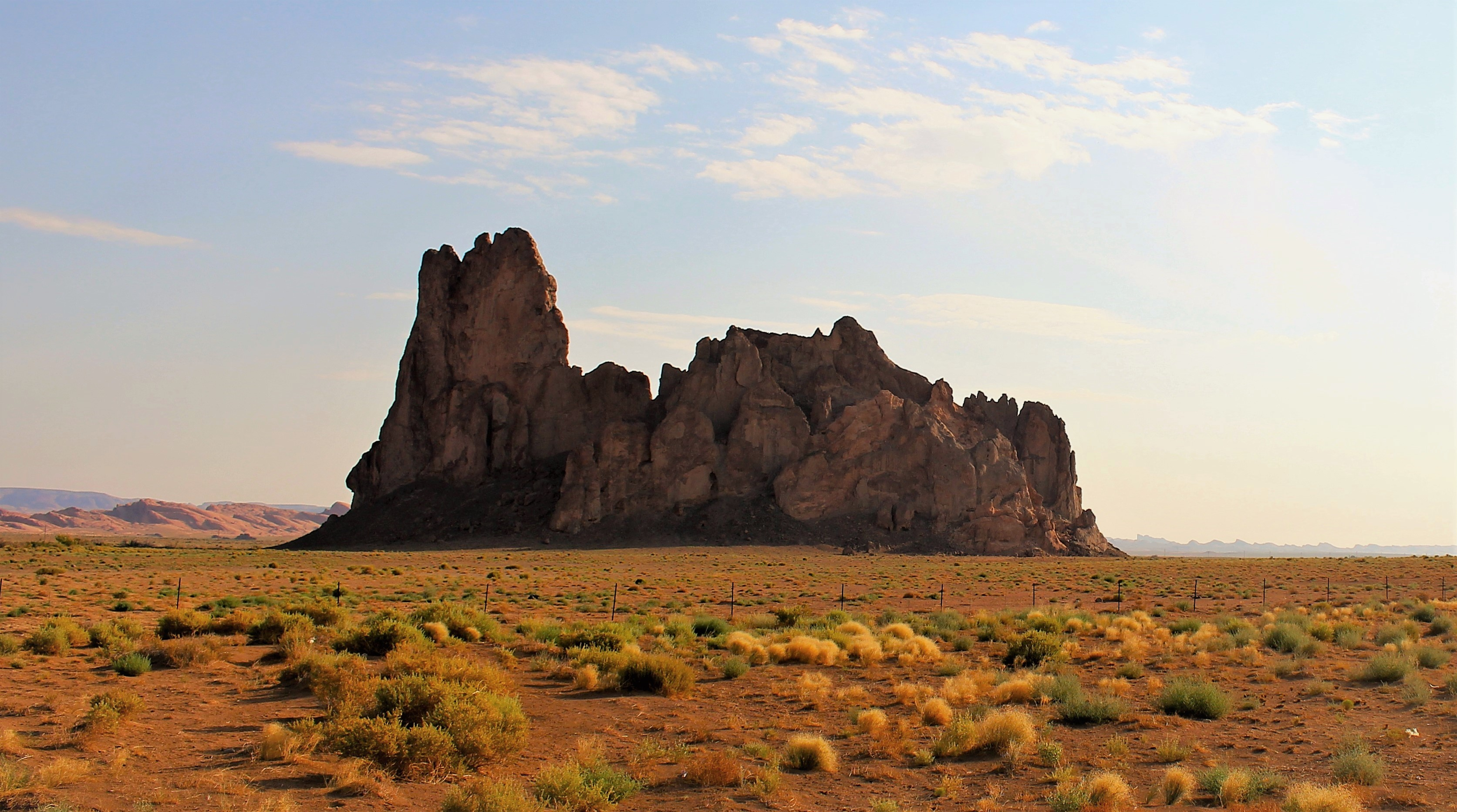

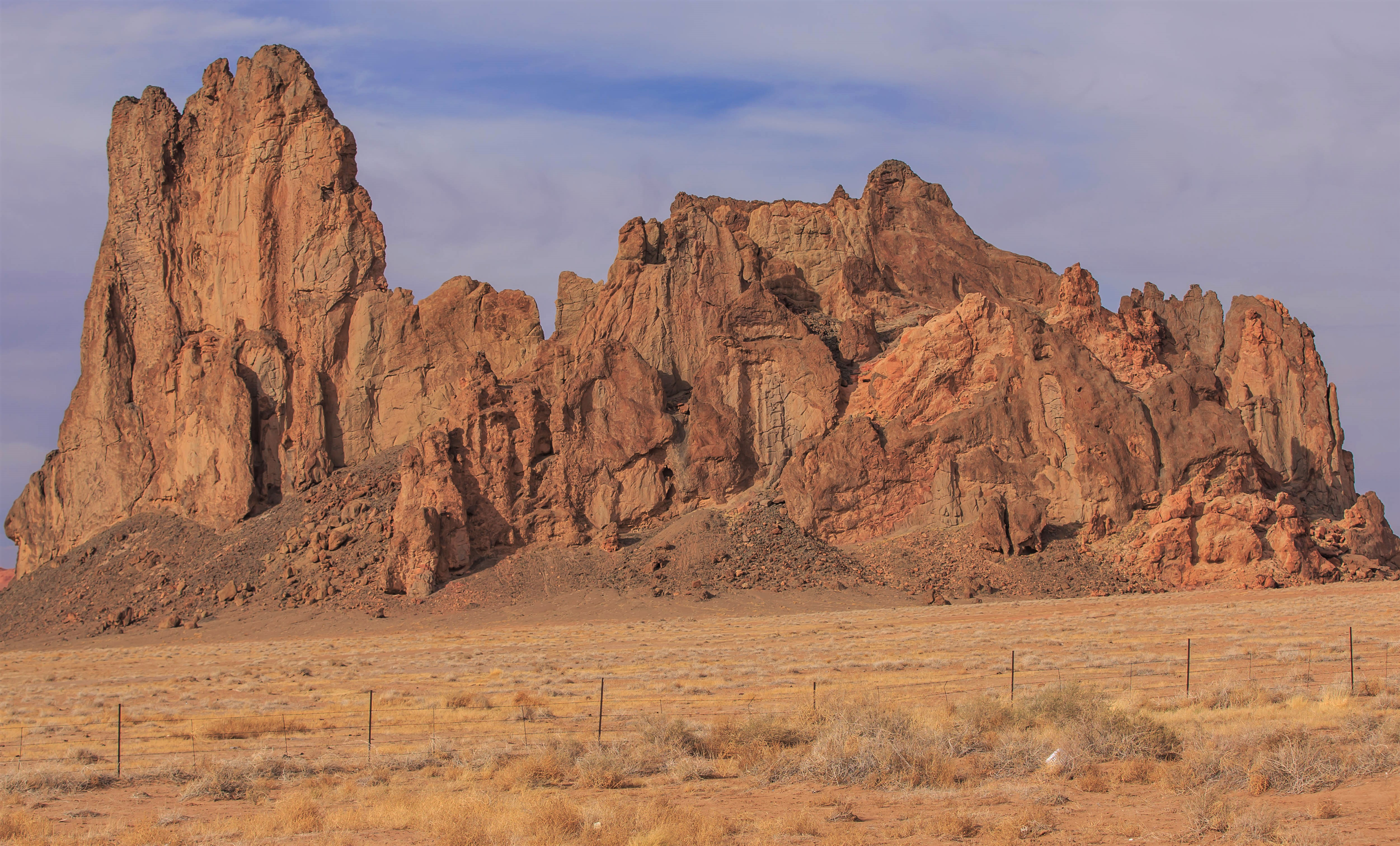

== Climate ==
Spring and fall are the most favorable seasons to visit Church Rock. According to the Köppen climate classification system, it is located in a semi-arid climate zone with cold winters and hot summers. Summers average 54 days above 90 °F (32 °C) annually, and highs rarely exceed 100 °F (38 °C). Summer nights are comfortably cool, and temperatures drop quickly after sunset. Winters are cold, but daytime highs are usually above freezing. Winter temperatures below 0 °F (−18 °C) are uncommon, though possible. This desert climate receives less than 10 inches (250 millimeters) of annual rainfall, and snowfall is generally light during the winter.

== See Also ==
Church Rock (Utah)
